= The Culture of Critique series =

Trilogy of books by Kevin MacDonald

The Culture of Critique
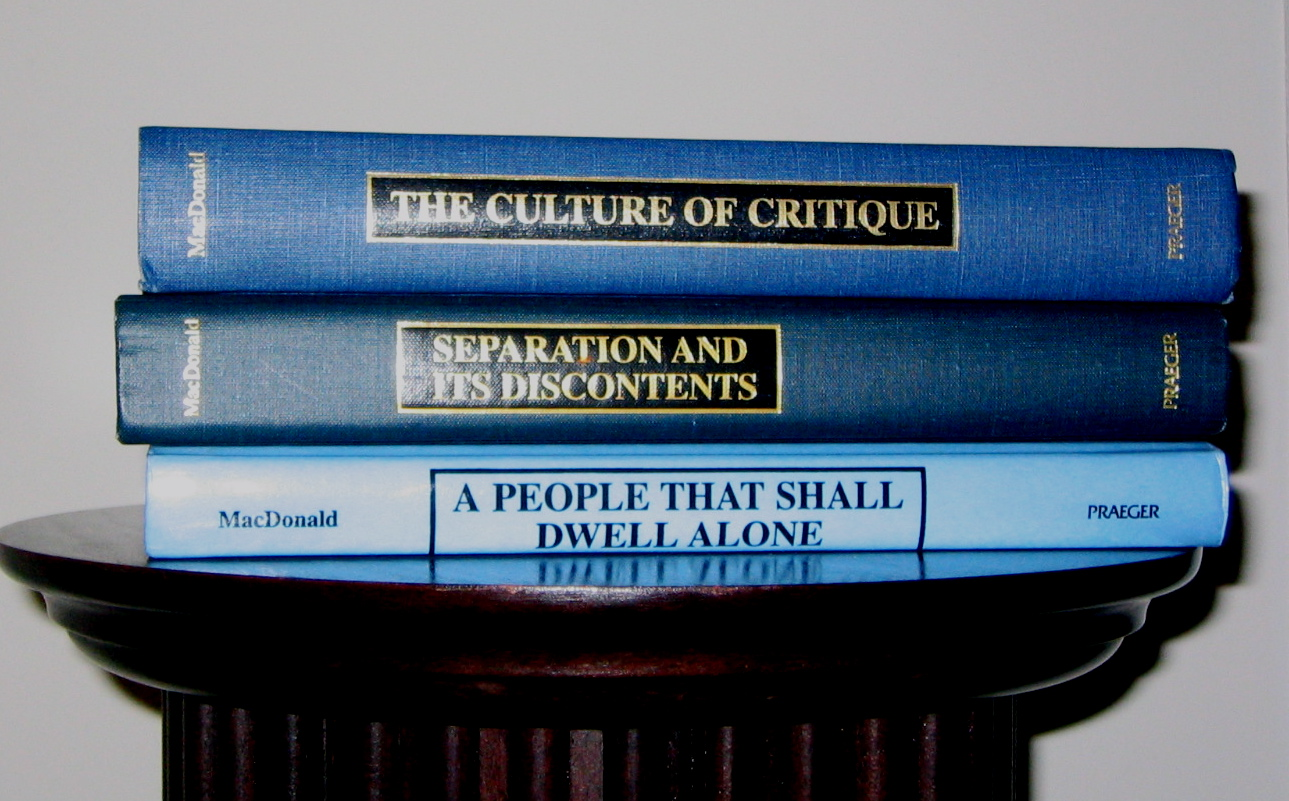
- The original trilogy, released between 1994–1998.
- A People That Shall Dwell Alone; Separation and Its Discontents; The Culture of Critique
- Author: Kevin B. MacDonald
- Country: United States
- Language: English
- Genre: Psychology
- Publisher: Praeger Publishing; Washington Summit Publishers; AuthorHouse
- Published: 1994–2004
- Media type: Print (hardcover and paperback)

The Culture of Critique series is a trilogy of books by Kevin B. MacDonald that promote antisemitic conspiracy theories. MacDonald, a white supremacist and retired professor of evolutionary psychology, claims that evolutionary psychology provides the motivations behind Jewish group behavior and culture. Through the series, MacDonald asserts that Jews as a group have biologically evolved to be highly ethnocentric and hostile to the interests of white people. He asserts Jewish behavior and culture are central causes of antisemitism, and promotes conspiracy theories about alleged Jewish control and influence in government policy and political movements.

The overwhelming majority of academic and journalistic reviews of MacDonald's work have dismissed it as pseudoscience grounded in conspiracy theories, and replete with misrepresentations and cherry-picking of sources. The work is regarded as having been motivated by MacDonald's antisemitic bias, rather than being an honest product of academic research.

The trilogy includes:

- A People That Shall Dwell Alone: Judaism as a Group Evolutionary Strategy, With Diaspora Peoples
- Separation and Its Discontents: Toward an Evolutionary Theory of Anti-Semitism
- The Culture of Critique: An Evolutionary Analysis of Jewish Involvement in Twentieth-Century Intellectual and Political Movements

== Series ==
The first books constitute what is known as MacDonald's "trilogy." In this trilogy, he describes Judaism as a "group evolutionary strategy" to enhance the ability of Jews to out-compete non-Jews for resources. He argues that Judaism fosters in Jews a series of marked genetic traits, including above-average verbal intelligence and a strong tendency toward collectivist behavior. MacDonald also notes a negative shift in tone from the first book to the third, and attributes it to having learned more, read more, and "changed greatly" in that time. MacDonald's trilogy has been described as significant for "its potential to forge a standardized anti-Semitic critique in the far right."

The trilogy was followed by additional writings on the topic published by The Occidental Quarterly, a periodical MacDonald currently edits:

=== A People That Shall Dwell Alone (1994) ===
MacDonald describes Judaism as having or being a "group evolutionary strategy" aimed at limiting exogamy, enforcing cultural segregation, promoting in-group charity and economic cooperation, and regulating in-group marriage and births to achieve high levels of intelligence, ability to acquire resources, parenting care, and group allegiance. He examines evidence from Jewish history, culture, and genetics supporting his thesis, arguing that Judaism is based on a strong—and possibly genetically based—predisposition to ethnocentrism characteristic of Middle Eastern cultures generally but exacerbated as a result of selective effects resulting from Jewish cultural practices. He considers the use of the complex and extensive Jewish scriptures and the high prestige of Rabbinic learning as eugenic mechanisms for promoting Jewish verbal intelligence and dexterity.

=== Separation and Its Discontents (1998) ===
Building on A People That Shall Dwell Alone, MacDonald examines antisemitism as a case study for an evolutionary explanation of ethnic conflict. Using social identity theory, he analyzes three historical periods of institutionalized antisemitism – the late Roman Empire, the Spanish Inquisition, and Nazi Germany. He argues that antisemitism arises from competition between groups pursuing their own interests rather than from irrational malice. MacDonald also asserts that strongly identified Jews, and highly ethnocentric individuals in general, may be prone to self-deception by overlooking or rationalizing negative information about their own group. Finally, he discusses whether increasing rates of intermarriage among Jews indicates that Judaism has ceased to function as a group evolutionary strategy, ultimately concluding that Judaism continues to be so.

=== The Culture of Critique (1998) ===
MacDonald examines 20th-century intellectual and political movements including Boasian anthropology, political radicalism, neoconservatism, psychoanalysis, the Frankfurt School, and the New York Intellectuals, arguing that key leaders and influential members of these movements maintained a strong sense of Jewish identity and viewed their activities as advancing what they perceived to be Jewish ethnic interests. MacDonald "categorically rejects an overarching conspiracy à la The Protocols of the Learned Elders of Zion and concedes that Judaism does not constitute a unified movement."

== Reception ==
The series has received a mostly negative response from academics and researchers as well as condemnation from civil rights organizations, being described as antisemitic and scientifically unsupportable.

Journalist Judith Shulevitz wrote in a 2000 Slate article that "Toward the end of the third book, MacDonald lays out his solution for restoring what he calls 'parity' between the Jews and other ethnic groups: systematic discrimination against Jews in college admission and employment and heavy taxation of Jews 'to counter the Jewish advantage in the possession of wealth.'"

Mark Potok of the Southern Poverty Law Center has said of MacDonald that "he put the anti-Semitism under the guise of scholarly work. ... Kevin MacDonald’s work is nothing but gussied-up anti-Semitism. At base it says that Jews are out to get us through their agenda. ... His work is bandied about by just about every neo-Nazi group in America."

The Anti-Defamation League has included MacDonald in its list of American extremists, Extremism in America, and has written a report on his views and ties. According to the ADL, MacDonald's views on Jews mimic those of antisemites from the late 19th and early 20th centuries.

=== Academic response ===
A paper by David Lieberman, a Holocaust researcher at Brandeis University, alleges that MacDonald has distorted evidence and chosen evidence selectively for rhetorical purposes.

John Tooby, past president of the Human Behavior and Evolution Society and a professor of anthropology at the University of California, Santa Barbara, insists that MacDonald is not an evolutionary psychologist, and that he advocates a generally discredited view of natural selection. Tooby, the founder of MacDonald's field of evolutionary psychology, criticized MacDonald in an article for the Salon website in 2000: "MacDonald's ideas—not just on Jews—violate fundamental principles of the field."

Reviewing MacDonald's A People That Shall Dwell Alone: Judaism as a Group Evolutionary Strategy in The Jewish Quarterly Review, Sander Gilman, professor of the Liberal Arts and Medicine at the University of Illinois at Chicago, describes MacDonald's arguments about a Jewish group evolutionary strategy as "bizarre". According to Gilman, "MacDonald recasts all of the hoary old myths about Jewish psychological difference and its presumed link to Jewish superior intelligence in contemporary sociobiological garb." Gilman also charges that "MacDonald manipulates his sources rather shamelessly," including Gilman's own work. Gilman concludes that MacDonald's book "is the most recent chapter in the continued myth-building concerning Jewish superior intelligence and achievement. It is, like the numerous earlier works, of interest in how positive images turn into the means by which Jewish difference is stressed and Jewish acculturation is shown to be pathological."

Reviewing MacDonald's A People That Shall Dwell Alone in the Journal for the Scientific Study of Religion, Eugen Schoenfeld, Professor Emeritus of Sociology at Georgia State University, commented that "the book is controversial, not only because of its theoretical approach, but also, and perhaps primarily, because of sloppy scholarship." Schoenfeld writes that MacDonald "selects historical incidents that can be used to support his thesis and conveniently omits others that challenge his thesis." Schoenfeld points to what he sees as MacDonald's "unfamiliarity with both the sociological frame of reference and historical knowledge," and as an example, notes that MacDonald's comparison of Jewish collectivism during the biblical period with eighteenth- and nineteenth-century English individualism "indicates a total ignorance of the impact of industrialization on Western societies."

Laurence Loeb of the University of Utah, writing for the Jewish Folklore and Ethnology Review in 1997, gave A People That Shall Dwell Alone a mostly positive review, calling it a "tour-de-force" that, despite containing "quite a number of errors, some of them glaring," nonetheless represented a "watershed contribution to the understanding of Judaism and Jewish life" based on a "cautious, careful assembling of evidence."

Reviewing MacDonald's Separation and Its Discontents in the American Jewish Society Review in 2000, Zev Garber, Professor of Jewish Studies at Los Angeles Valley College, wrote that MacDonald works from the assumption that the dual Torah is the blueprint of the eventual Jewish dominion over the world and that he sees contemporary antisemitism, the Holocaust, and attacks against Israel as "provoked by Jews themselves. In this scenario, Jews imagine themselves as innocent victims of hatred and violence." Garber concludes that MacDonald's "rambling who-is-who-isn't roundup of Jews responsible for the 'Jewish Problem' borders on the irrational and is conducive to misrepresentation."

Daniel Kriegman, an evolutionary psychologist, criticized MacDonald's work as "pseudoscientific theorizing ... MacDonald is not the first person to avoid the narcissistic injury of having his ideas rejected by concluding that there was a conspiracy against him rather than becoming aware of the substandard nature [as evidenced in his trilogy] of his thinking."

A history professor at MacDonald's university, Don Schwarz, called MacDonald's claims about Jewish history "unsupportable." Philosophy Professor Warren Weinstein said that MacDonald's work was not science at all, but "something else, masquerading as science": and that "It is in the great tradition of Nazi and Stalinist science which clearly and scientifically proved that their respective insanities were objectively true and defensible."

Academic Jaff Schatz has accused MacDonald of misrepresenting and misusing his work.

John Hartung, the former associate editor of the Journal of Neurosurgical Anesthesiology and an associate professor of anesthesiology at the State University of New York, said that MacDonald's The Culture of Critique was "quite disturbing, seriously misinformed about evolutionary genetics, and suffering from a huge blind spot about the nature of Christianity."

In a 2000 review in the journal Shofar, reviewer Jefferson A. Singer wrote that he considered the book to be "written out of a deep and destructive hatred for Jews," and questioned the editorial policy of the books' publisher, Praeger, in "bringing a book of such dubious scientific merit to a larger audience and in giving it an air of legitimacy it does not deserve."

In March 2018, Nathan Cofnas, a philosophy graduate student at the University of Oxford and another advocate of race science, published a critique of MacDonald's theory in the journal Human Nature where he concluded that MacDonald relied "on systematically misrepresented sources and cherry-picked facts." The paper was downloaded on more occasions in a single month than the rest of the journal's articles typically receive in a full year. Cofnas's article prompted a response defending MacDonald from Edward Dutton, a theologian and YouTuber affiliated with Richard Lynn's think tank, the Ulster Institute for Social Research. Dutton's response was rejected by Human Nature, and was instead published by Evolutionary Psychological Science. The attention prompted by Cofnas's paper was itself commented on. Anthropologist Robert Boyd of Arizona State University described the topic itself as "totally toxic," Steven Pinker described MacDonald's and Dutton's arguments as "extraordinarily weak," while Aryeh Tuchman of the Anti-Defamation League said that the renewed attention falsely implied that MacDonald's antisemitic tropes have academic legitimacy.

== See also ==
- Dominant minority
- Middleman minority
- Ethnocentrism
- Model minority
- Scientific racism
