= Kevin MacDonald (evolutionary psychologist) =

American psychologist and white supremacist (born 1944)

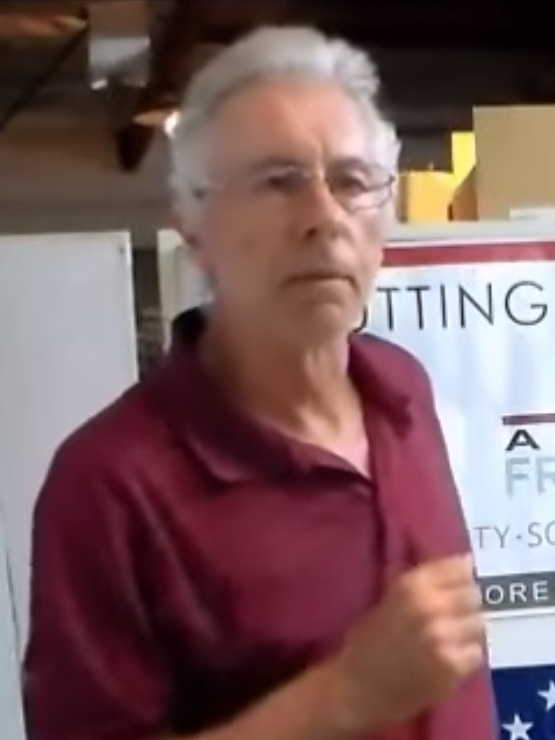
- MacDonald at American Freedom Party conference 2013
- Born: Kevin B. MacDonald; January 24, 1944 (age 82); Oshkosh, Wisconsin, U.S.
- Education: University of Wisconsin, Madison (BA); University of Connecticut (MS, PhD)
- Notable work: The Culture of Critique series
- Website: Official website

Kevin B. MacDonald (born January 24, 1944) is an American antisemitic conspiracy theorist, white supremacist, and retired professor of evolutionary psychology at California State University, Long Beach (CSULB).

MacDonald is known for his promotion of a pseudoscientific antisemitic theory, most prominently within The Culture of Critique series, according to which Western Jews have tended to be politically liberal and involved in politically or sexually transgressive social, philosophical, and artistic movements because, he asserts, Jews have biologically evolved to undermine the societies in which they live. In short, MacDonald argues that Jews have evolved to be highly ethnocentric and hostile to the interests of "white people", a racial category of which he considers Jewish people not to be a part. In an interview with Tablet magazine in 2020, MacDonald said: "Jews are just gonna destroy white power completely, and destroy America as a white country."

Some scholars describe the theory as analogous to older conspiracy theories about a Jewish plot to undermine European civilization. In 2008, the CSULB academic senate voted to disassociate itself from MacDonald's work.

MacDonald's theories have received support from antisemitic conspiracy theorists and neo-Nazi groups. He serves as editor of The Occidental Observer, which he says covers "white identity, white interests, and the culture of the West". He is described by the Anti-Defamation League as having "become a primary voice for anti-Semitism from far-right intellectuals" and by the Southern Poverty Law Center as "the neo-Nazi movement's favorite academic". He has been described as part of the alt-right movement. By 2010, MacDonald was one of the eight members of the board of directors of the newly founded American Third Position (known from 2013 as the American Freedom Party), an organization stating that it "exists to represent the political interests of White Americans".

== Early years ==
Kevin B. MacDonald was born on January 24, 1944, in Oshkosh, Wisconsin, to a Roman Catholic family. His father was a policeman and his mother was a secretary. He attended Catholic parochial schools and played basketball in high school. He entered the University of Wisconsin–Madison as a philosophy major. MacDonald abandoned his Catholic faith during his time in college. He became involved in the anti-war movement, which brought him into contact with Jewish student activists.

Between 1970 and 1974, he worked towards becoming a jazz pianist, spending two years in Jamaica, where he taught high school. By the late 1970s, he had left that career.

== Professional background ==
MacDonald is the author of seven books on evolutionary theory and child development and is the author or editor of over 30 academic articles in refereed journals. He received his B.A. from the University of Wisconsin–Madison in 1966, and M.S. in biology from the University of Connecticut in 1976. In 1981, he earned a PhD in biobehavioral sciences from the University of Connecticut, where his adviser was Benson Ginsburg, a founder of modern behavioral genetics. His thesis was on the behavioral development of wolves and resulted in two publications.

MacDonald completed a post-doctoral fellowship with Ross Parke in the psychology department of the University of Illinois at Urbana-Champaign in 1983. MacDonald and Parke's work there resulted in three publications.

MacDonald joined the Department of Psychology at California State University, Long Beach (CSU-LB) in 1985, and became a full professor in 1995. He announced his retirement at the end of 2014.

MacDonald served as Secretary-Archivist of the Human Behavior and Evolution Society and was elected as a member of the executive board from 1995 to 2001. He was editor of Population and Environment from 1999 to 2004, working with Virginia Abernethy, the previous editor, who he persuaded to join the editorial board, along with J. Philippe Rushton, both "intellectual allies" according to the SPLC. MacDonald has made occasional contributions to VDARE, a website focused on opposition to immigration to the United States and classified as a hate group by the Southern Poverty Law Center.

== Work on ethnicity ==
=== Judaism and Jewish culture ===
MacDonald wrote a trilogy of books purporting to analyze Judaism and secular Jewish culture from the perspective of evolutionary psychology: A People That Shall Dwell Alone (1994), Separation and Its Discontents (1998), and The Culture of Critique (1998). He labels Judaism as a "group evolutionary strategy", one that he claims enhances the ability of Jews to outcompete non-Jews for resources. Using the term "Jewish ethnocentrism", he argues that Judaism fosters in Jews a series of marked genetic traits, including above-average verbal intelligence and a strong tendency toward collectivist behavior, as manifested in a series of influential intellectual movements. MacDonald acknowledges that not all Jews in all circumstances display the traits he identifies. Separation and Its Discontents contains a chapter entitled "National Socialism as an Anti-Jewish Group Evolutionary Strategy". According to a summary of MacDonald's ideas by Heidi Beirich of the SPLC in 2007, MacDonald argues that Nazism emerged as a means of opposing, to use MacDonald's term, "Judaism as a group evolutionary strategy". He contends Jewish "group behavior" created understandable hatred for Jews. Thus in MacDonald's opinion, writes Beirich:

"anti-Semitism, rather than being an irrational hatred for Jews, is actually a logical reaction to Jewish success. In other words, the Nazis, like many other anti-Semites, were only anti-Semitic because they were countering a genuine Jewish threat to their well-being."

== Reception ==
=== Irving v Lipstadt libel trial (2000) ===
MacDonald testified in the unsuccessful libel suit brought by the Holocaust denier David Irving against the American historian Deborah Lipstadt; he was the only witness for Irving who spoke on his behalf willingly. Irving had told the judge that MacDonald would need to be on the witness stand for three days, but his testimony only lasted a few hours. Irving asked if MacDonald "perceived the Jewish community as working in a certain way in order to suppress a certain book" and MacDonald responded in the affirmative, asserting there were "several tactics the Jewish organizations have used." MacDonald was quoted as having said in the course of his testimony that he was an "agnostic" in regards to the Holocaust, though he denied the accuracy of the quote.

Deborah Lipstadt's lawyer Richard Rampton thought MacDonald's testimony on behalf of Irving was of so little help to Irving that he did not bother to cross-examine him. MacDonald later commented in an article for the Journal of Historical Review, published by the Institute for Historical Review, a Holocaust-denying organisation, that Lipstadt and Jewish groups were attempting to restrict access to Irving's work because it was against Jewish interests and agenda. On the Holocaust itself, MacDonald later said that "he ha[d] never doubted the Holocaust took place, but because he ha[d] not studied its history he describe[d] himself as an 'agnostic' on the subject."

=== Academic reception ===
At the time of its release, A People That Shall Dwell Alone received mixed reviews from scholars; his subsequent books were less well received.

John Tooby, the founder of MacDonald's field of evolutionary psychology, criticized MacDonald in an article for Salon in 2000. He wrote, "MacDonald's ideas—not just on Jews—violate fundamental principles of the field." Tooby posits that MacDonald is not an evolutionary psychologist.

MacDonald has been accused by some academics in Policing the National Body: Sex, Race, and Criminalization of employing racial "techniques of scapegoating [that] may have evolved in complexity from classical Nazi fascism, but the similarities are far from remote."

Steven Pinker, the Johnstone Family Professor of Psychology at Harvard University, wrote that MacDonald's work fails "basic tests of scientific credibility." Pinker, while acknowledging that he had "not plowed through MacDonald's trilogy and therefore run the complementary risks of being unfair to his arguments, and of not refuting them resoundingly enough to distance them from my own views on evolutionary psychology", states that MacDonald's theses are unable to pass the threshold of attention-worthiness or peer-approval, and contain a "consistently invidious portrayal of Jews, couched in value-laden, disparaging language".

Reviewing MacDonald's Separation and Its Discontents in 2000 Zev Garber, Chair of Jewish Studies at Los Angeles Valley College, writes that MacDonald works from the assumption that the "dual Torah", meaning both the written and oral traditions of Judaism, is the blueprint of eventual Jewish dominion over the world, and that he sees contemporary antisemitism, the Holocaust, and attacks against Israel as "provoked by Jews themselves." Garber concludes that MacDonald's "rambling who-is-who-isn't roundup of Jews responsible for the 'Jewish Problem' borders on the irrational and is conducive to misrepresentation."

In 2001, David Lieberman, a Holocaust researcher at Brandeis University, wrote "Scholarship as an Exercise in Rhetorical Strategy: A Case Study of Kevin MacDonald's Research Techniques", a paper in which he notes that one of MacDonald's sources, Jaff Schatz, objected to how MacDonald used his writings to further his premise that Jewish self-identity validates antisemitic sentiments and actions. "At issue, however, is not the quality of Schatz's research, but MacDonald's use of it, a discussion that relies less on topical expertise than on a willingness to conduct close comparative readings", Lieberman wrote. Lieberman accused MacDonald of dishonestly using lines from the work of Holocaust denier David Irving. Citing Irving's Uprising, published in 1981 for the 25th anniversary of Hungary's failed anti-Communist revolution in 1956, MacDonald asserted in the Culture of Critique:

The domination of the Hungarian communist Jewish bureaucracy thus appears to have had overtones of sexual and reproductive domination of gentiles in which Jewish males were able to have disproportionate sexual access to gentile females.

Lieberman, who said that MacDonald is not a historian, debunked those assertions, concluding that "the passage offers not a shred of evidence that, as MacDonald would have it, 'Jewish males enjoyed disproportionate sexual access to gentile females.'"

Most academics have rejected MacDonald's views about Judaism and race as being unworthy of legitimization or serious attention. In a critique of MacDonald in the journal Human Nature in 2018, Nathan Cofnas argued that scholars should critically engage with MacDonald's work, in part due to its popularity among antisemites. Cofnas's conclusion was that MacDonald's work relied upon "misrepresented sources and cherry-picked facts" and that the "evidence actually favors a simpler explanation of Jewish overrepresentation in intellectual movements involving Jewish high intelligence and geographic distribution."

In an April 2018 commentary in The Wall Street Journal, political scientist Abraham Miller wrote that MacDonald's theories about Jews were "the philosophical and theoretical inspiration" behind the slogan "Jews will not replace us" used at the 2017 white supremacist Unite the Right rally.

Joan Braune, a hate studies scholar who has also written about the Frankfurt School, wrote an analysis of "Cultural Marxism", an antisemitic conspiracy theory, focusing on MacDonald and two others as among the "main proponents of the theory in the United States today". MacDonald writes about "Cultural Marxism" in the third volume of his trilogy, describing it as a Jewish group evolutionary strategy adopted initially by the Frankfurt School that, MacDonald claims, works by appearing to adopt universalist positions (such as social justice) as a ruse to defend Jewish interests by shaming white people into undermining their own race. Braune concludes that "The Culture of Critique is an exercise in circular reasoning and propaganda, not serious scholarship. Its attempts at 'science' are laughable at best", and notes that it unironically quotes Hitler's Mein Kampf as a source on Jewish behaviour.

=== Criticism by the ADL and the SPLC ===
Mark Potok of the Southern Poverty Law Center (SPLC) claims of MacDonald that "he put the anti-Semitism under the guise of scholarly work. ... Kevin MacDonald's work is nothing but gussied-up anti-Semitism. At base it says that Jews are out to get us through their agenda. ... His work is bandied about by just about every neo-Nazi group in America."

The Anti-Defamation League (ADL) includes MacDonald in its list of American extremists, "Extremism in America", and wrote a report on MacDonald's views and ties. According to the ADL, his views on Jews mimic those of anti-Semites from the late 19th and early 20th centuries.

Heidi Beirich wrote in an SPLC Intelligence Report in April 2007:

"Not since Hitler's Mein Kampf have anti-Semites had such a comprehensive reference guide to what's 'wrong with Jews.' His work is widely advertised and touted on white supremacist websites and sold by neo-Nazi outfits like National Vanguard Books, which considers them 'the most important books of the last 100 years.'"

MacDonald claims the SPLC has misrepresented and distorted his work.

== CSULB comments ==
In response to MacDonald's research, the Psychology Department of his university in 2006 issued three statements: a "Statement on Academic Freedom and Responsibility in Research," a "Statement on Diversity," and a "Statement on Misuse of Psychologists' Work, one of which strongly condemned the knowing misuse of psychological research "by groups that disseminate views of racial/ethnic superiority and/or racial/ethnic hatred."" The university administration continued to support him, and a California State University (CSULB) spokeswoman stated, "The university will support MacDonald's academic freedom and freedom of speech." In response to the controversy, MacDonald was pressured to post a disclaimer on his website: "nothing on this website should be interpreted to suggest that I condone white racial superiority, genocide, Nazism, or Holocaust denial. I advocate none of these and strongly dissociate myself and my work from groups that do. Nor should my opinions be used to support discrimination against Jews or any other group." He has since removed that disclaimer.

A spokeswoman for CSULB, said that at least two classes a year taught by all professors—including MacDonald—have student evaluations, and that some of the questions on those evaluations are open-ended, allowing students to raise any issue. "Nothing has come through" to suggest bias in class, she said. "We don't see it." Jonathan Knight, who handles academic freedom issues for the American Association of University Professors said if there are no indications that MacDonald shares his views in class, "I don't see a basis for an investigation" into what goes on in his courses.

=== CSULB disassociates from MacDonald's views ===
Late in 2006, a report issued by the Southern Poverty Law Center after an on-campus investigation labelled his work antisemitic and neo-Nazi propaganda, and described increasing concern about Macdonald's views by CSULB faculty members. In late 2007, California State University–Long Beach's Department of Psychology began the process of formally disassociating itself from MacDonald's views on Judaism, which in some cases are "used by publications considered to publicize neo-Nazi and white supremacist ideology." The department's move followed a discussion of MacDonald's December forum presentation at a meeting of the department's advisory committee that concerned his ethics and methodologies.

In April 2007, a colleague of MacDonald's, Martin Fiebert, criticized MacDonald for "bigotry and cultural insensitivity", and called it "troubling" that MacDonald's work was being cited by white supremacist and neo-Nazi organizations.

In an e-mail sent to the college's Daily Forty-Niner newspaper, MacDonald said that he had already pledged not to teach about race differences in intelligence as a requirement for teaching his psychology class, and expressed that he was "not happy" about the disassociation. The newspaper reported that in the email, MacDonald confirmed that his books contained what the paper described as "his claims that the Jewish race was having a negative effect on Western civilization." He said in an interview posted on his website by February 2008 that he had been the victim of "faculty e-mail wars" and "tried to defend myself showing that what I was doing was scientific and rational and reasonable — and people have not responded."

The Department of Psychology voted to release an April 23, 2008 statement saying, "We respect and defend his right to express his views, but we affirm that they are his alone and are in no way endorsed by the Department." The department expressed particular concern that "Dr. MacDonald's research on Jewish culture does not adhere to the Department's explicitly stated values."

On May 5, the school's academic senate issued a joint statement disassociating the school from MacDonald's antisemitic views, including specific statements from the Psychology department, the History department, the Anthropology department, the Jewish Studies program, and the Linguistics department. The statement concludes: "While the Academic Senate defends Dr. Kevin MacDonald's academic freedom and freedom of speech, as it does for all faculty, it firmly and unequivocally disassociates itself from the anti-Semitic and white ethnocentric views he has expressed."

The senate considered but rejected the use of the word "condemns" in the statement.

== Non-academic affiliations ==
=== The Occidental Quarterly and the National Policy Institute ===
MacDonald is the editor of the magazine The Occidental Quarterly and has contributed to it on many occasions. The magazine is a publication of the National Policy Institute, a white supremacist think tank led by Richard B. Spencer. The Occidental Quarterly was described by the Anti-Defamation League in 2012 as "a racist print publication that mimics the look and style of academic journals." The Occidental Quarterly published MacDonald's monograph, Understanding Jewish Influence: A Study in Ethnic Activism, in 2004. Journalist Max Blumenthal reported in a 2006 article for The Nation that the work "has turned MacDonald into a celebrity within white nationalist and neo-Nazi circles."

In October 2004, MacDonald accepted the "Jack London Literary Prize" of $10,000 from The Occidental Quarterly. In his acceptance speech, he supported the concept of a white "ethnostate" that would exclude non-European immigrants.

In November 2016, MacDonald was a keynote speaker at an event hosted in Washington, D.C. by the National Policy Institute. The event concluded with Spencer leading the chant, "Hail Trump, hail our people, hail victory."

=== David Duke ===
Former Ku Klux Klan leader David Duke praised MacDonald's work on his website. MacDonald has appeared on Duke's radio program on multiple occasions, saying he agrees with the "vast majority" of Duke's statements.

When MacDonald won his award from The Occidental Quarterly, the ceremony was attended by David Duke; Don Black, the founder of white supremacist site Stormfront; Jamie Kelso, a senior moderator at Stormfront; and the head of the neo-Nazi National Vanguard, Kevin Alfred Strom. In 2005, Kelso told The Occidental Report that he was meeting up with MacDonald to conduct business. MacDonald is featured in Stormfront member Brian Jost's anti-immigration film, The Line in the Sand, where he "blam[ed] Jews for destroying America by supporting immigration from developing countries."

=== American Freedom Party ===
In January 2010, it became known that MacDonald had accepted a position as one of the eight members of the board of directors of the newly founded American Third Position (known from 2013 as the American Freedom Party), whose website has stated that the group "exists to represent the political interests of White Americans". A statement on the website reads, "If current demographic trends persist, European-Americans will become a minority in America in only a few decades time. The American Third Position will not allow this to happen. To safeguard our identity and culture, and to secure an American future for our people, we will immediately put an indefinite moratorium on all immigration."

=== Anders Breivik ===
Kevin MacDonald was impressed by mass shooter Anders Breivik's writings on "Cultural Marxism". Breivik was, MacDonald wrote after his attack, "a serious political thinker with a great many insights and some good practical ideas on strategy."

== Bibliography ==
- MacDonald, K.B. Individualism and the Western Liberal Tradition: Evolutionary Origins, History, and Prospects for the Future (self-published, 2019); ISBN 978-1-0896-9148-8
- MacDonald, K.B. Understanding Jewish Influence: A Study in Ethnic Activism, with an Introduction by Samuel T. Francis, (Occidental Quarterly, November 2004); ISBN 1-59368-017-1 Introduction online
- Burgess, Robert L. and MacDonald, K.B. (eds.) Evolutionary Perspectives on Human Development, 2nd ed., (Sage 2004); ISBN 0-7619-2790-5
- MacDonald, K.B. The Culture of Critique: An Evolutionary Analysis of Jewish Involvement in Twentieth-Century Intellectual and Political Movements (Praeger 1998); ISBN 0-275-96113-3 (Preface online)
- MacDonald, K.B. Separation and Its Discontents Toward an Evolutionary Theory of Anti-Semitism (Praeger 1998); ISBN 0-275-94870-6
- MacDonald, K.B. A People That Shall Dwell Alone: Judaism As a Group Evolutionary Strategy, With Diaspora Peoples (Praeger 1994); ISBN 0-595-22838-0
- MacDonald, K.B. (Ed.), Parent-Child Play: Descriptions and Implications (State University of New York Press, 1993)
- MacDonald, K.B. (Ed.) Sociobiological Perspectives on Human Development, (Springer-Verlag, 1988)
- MacDonald, K.B. Social and Personality Development: An Evolutionary Synthesis (Plenum, 1988)
