= William Regnery II =

American white nationalist and political activist (1941–2021)

William Henry Regnery II
- Born: February 25, 1941; Illinois, US
- Died: July 2, 2021 (aged 80); Boca Grande, Florida, US
- Education: University of Pennsylvania (dropped out)
- Occupation: Fundraiser
- Known for: Fouding Charles Martel Society; Founding National Policy Institute
- Parents: William Regnery (father); Elisabeth Brittain (mother)
- Relatives: William Henry Regnery (paternal grandfather); Henry Francis Regnery (uncle); Alfred S. Regnery (cousin)

William Henry Regnery II (February 25, 1941 – July 2, 2021) was an American white nationalist political activist and donor, and an heir to a multi-million dollar fortune. He was the founder of the National Policy Institute, a white nationalist/supremacist think tank that has been credited with expanding the alt-right.

== Early life and education ==
William H. Regnery II was born on February 25, 1941, near Chicago and was raised in Hinsdale, Illinois. His father, William F. Regnery, worked for Joanna-Western Mills, the family textile concern. His mother, Elisabeth (Brittain) Regnery, was a homemaker. His paternal grandfather, William H. Regnery, was a "textile magnate, banker, and philanthropist in Chicago." His uncle, Henry, in 1947 founded Regnery Publishing, which the Regnery family sold in 1993.

Regnery enrolled at the University of Pennsylvania, where he studied political science. He dropped out before graduation. He was in charge of the family business "for only 15 months" around 1980, but he was later sued by his family, who subsequently sold the business.

== Career ==
While in college, Regnery was an active member of the Intercollegiate Studies Institute. He remained on their board until 2006, when after refusing calls to resign following a speech he gave at a conference for the white supremacist magazine American Renaissance, he was voted off the organization's board. He also worked on Barry Goldwater's 1964 presidential campaign.

Regnery founded the Charles Martel Society, a non-profit organization based in Georgia, in 2001. The organization publishes a racist and antisemitic journal, The Occidental Quarterly. According to the Associated Press, the society "raised $568,526 between 2007 and 2014" in tax deductible contributions.

Regnery founded the National Policy Institute, a white supremacist and identitarian think tank now based in Alexandria, Virginia, in 2005. In 2011, he hired Richard B. Spencer to run it. By 2020, the IRS had revoked the Institute's tax-exempt status.

Regnery was described by the Southern Poverty Law Center as "a prime mover and shaker in white nationalism" and "famously reclusive". They add that he worked to organize and fund a racist and antisemitic network of publishers, websites and groups.

== Personal life ==
Regnery resided in Boca Grande, Florida. He died of cancer there on July 2, 2021, at the age of 80.

According to George Hawley, an assistant professor of Political Science at the University of Alabama, Regnery "seems to be the black sheep of the family, and he generally avoids the public spotlight."
