= Henry Regnery =

American publisher (1912–1996)

Henry Francis Regnery
- Born: January 5, 1912; Hinsdale, Illinois, U.S.
- Died: June 18, 1996 (aged 84); Chicago, Illinois, U.S.
- Other names: Henry Francis Regnery, Sr.
- Education: Massachusetts Institute of Technology (BS); Harvard University (MA)
- Occupation: Publisher
- Known for: Founding Henry Regnery Company; Cofounding Human Events
- Spouse: Eleanor Scattergood
- Children: 4, including Alfred S. Regnery
- Parent(s): William Henry Regnery; Francis Susan Thrasher
- Relatives: William Henry Regnery II (nephew)

Henry Francis Regnery (1912–1996) was a conservative American publisher who founded the newspaper Human Events (1944) and the Henry Regnery Company (1947) and published Russell Kirk's classic work The Conservative Mind (1953).

== Early life and education ==
Regnery was born on January 5, 1912, in Hinsdale, Illinois, the second-youngest of five children of Frances Susan Thrasher and William Henry Regnery, a wealthy Catholic textile manufacturer who had emigrated from Ensch, Germany.

He obtained a BS in Mathematics from the Massachusetts Institute of Technology in 1933, and an MA from Harvard University, where he worked with Joseph Schumpeter.

He also studied at Armour Institute of Technology, and from 1934 to 1936 at the University of Bonn.

== Career ==
After graduation, Regnery worked for the New Deal's Resettlement Administration (around the time that Ware Group member Lee Pressman left to go work for John L. Lewis at the Congress of Industrial Organizations).

=== Publishing ===
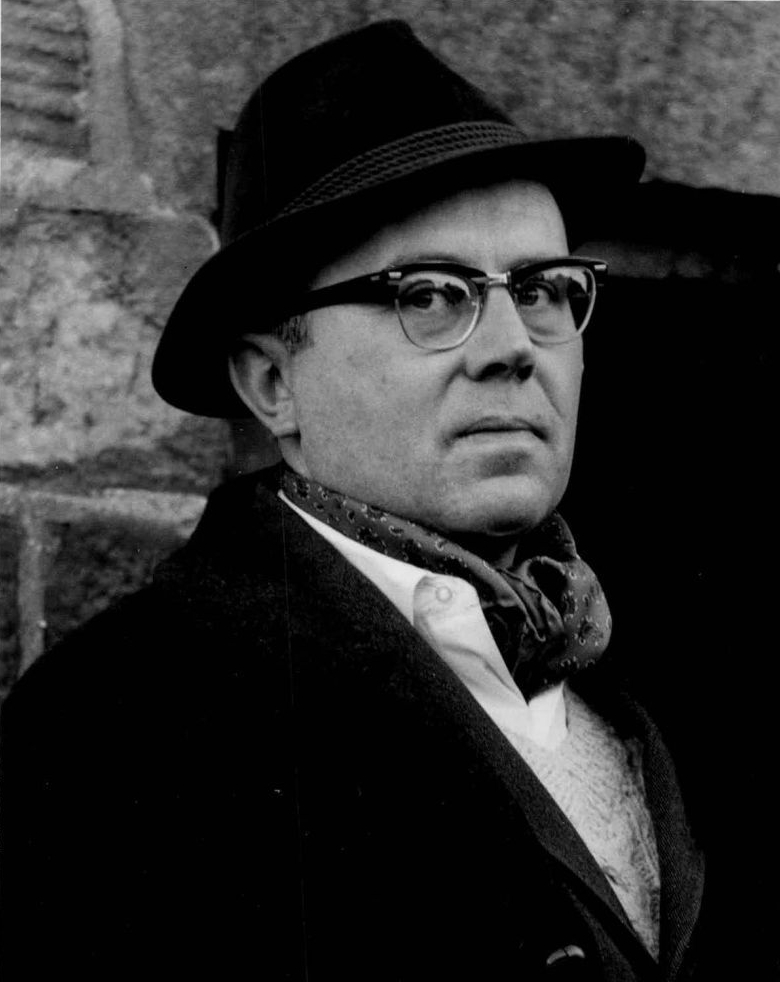
Regnery published Russell Kirk's book The Conservative Mind

In 1944, Regnery financed the creation of the conservative newspaper Human Events.

In 1947, he founded the Henry Regnery Company, now Regnery Publishing. "[I]t was a measure of the grip that liberal-minded editors had on American publishing at the time that Regnery, which was founded in 1947, was one of only two houses known to be sympathetic to conservative authors," according to Henry Regnery's 1996 obituary.

In 1951, Regnery published God and Man at Yale, the first book written by William F. Buckley, Jr. At that time, Regnery had a close affiliation with the University of Chicago and published classics for the Great Books series at the University, but he lost the contract as a result of publishing Buckley's book. In 1953, Regnery published Russell Kirk's The Conservative Mind, as well as books by Albert Jay Nock, James J. Kilpatrick, and James Burnham. He also published paperback editions of literary works by novelist Wyndham Lewis and poets T. S. Eliot and Ezra Pound. In 1954, Regnery published McCarthy and His Enemies by William F. Buckley and L. Brent Bozell Jr. "Although Mr. Buckley [...] had criticized the senator for 'gross exaggerations,' Mr. McCarthy said he would not dispute the merits of the book with the authors," according to a news article in The New York Times. While criticizing McCarthy, the book was sympathetic to him (and in fact was harsher on McCarthy's critics than it was on the senator for making false allegations), and McCarthy attended a reception for the authors.

In the early 1950s, Regnery published two books by Robert Welch, who went on to found the John Birch Society in 1958. In May God Forgive Us, Welch criticized influential foreign-policy analysts and policymakers and accused many of working to further Communism as part of a conspiracy. In 1954, Regnery published Welch's biography of John Birch, an American Baptist missionary in China who was killed by Chinese Communists after he became a U.S. intelligence officer in World War II.

Regnery sold Henry Regnery Company and started Regnery Publishing, which son Alfred inherited.

=== Associations ===
In the latter 1930s, Regnery became a member of the America First Committee, of which his father was a co-founder. Regnery was a member of the American Friends Service Committee, the American Conservatory of Music, and the Chicago Literary Club. He was a trustee of Shimer College in the early 1960s and president of the Philadelphia Society.

== Personal life and death ==
Regnery married Eleanor Scattergood; they had four children: Alfred S. Regnery (1942), Henry Francis Regnery Jr. (1945), Susan Regnery Schnitzler, and Margaret Regnery Caron. Their son Henry Francis Regnery Jr. was killed with the crash of American Airlines Flight 191 in 1979.

Regnery died age 84 on June 18, 1996, in Chicago of complications of brain surgery.

His nephew, William Regnery II, became the founder of the white nationalist organizations Charles Martel Society and National Policy Institute.

== Works ==
Works written by Regnery include:

Books

- Memoirs of a Dissident Publisher (1985)
- The Cliff Dwellers: The History of a Chicago Cultural Institution (1990)
- Creative Chicago: From the Chap-Book to the University (1993)
- A Few Reasonable Words: Selected Writings (1996)

Chapbooks, pamphlets

- Congruences and Residues (1934)
- Wyndham Lewis: A Man Against His Time (1969)
- Russell Kirk: An Appraisal (1980)
- William H. Regnery and His Family (1981)
- The Present State of Book Publishing (1984)
- A Prophet Without Honor in His Own Country: Francis F. Browne and The Dial (1985)
- To Edit or Not to Edit (1995)

=== Legacy ===
Henry Regnery's papers are kept at the Hoover Institution at Stanford University.
