= Kevin Lamb =

American white nationalist writer

Kevin Lamb is an American white nationalist, and freelance writer. He is the managing editor of The Social Contract, a white nationalist and anti-immigration quarterly journal, as well as a founding editor of The Occidental Quarterly, a white nationalist and antisemitic publication. He briefly served as communications director of the white supremacist think tank National Policy Institute.

A graduate of Indiana University with a degree in political science, Lamb worked as managing editor of Human Events from 2002 until 2005, when the Southern Poverty Law Center brought his "racial realist" views and affiliations to his editors’ attention, prompting his resignation.

Lamb was a founding editor of The Occidental Quarterly, a white nationalist publication espousing anti-immigrant and antisemitic views, and advocates for a white American ethno-state. In 2007, he resigned his position as editor, and has no recent affiliation with the publication. He has since become managing editor of The Social Contract Press and its flagship magazine, which espouses similar views. The Social Contract Press has been designated as a hate group by the Southern Poverty Law Center.

Lamb assisted Samuel T. Francis in assembling, editing and publishing a collection of essays titled Race and the American Prospect: Essays on the Racial Realities of Our Nation and Our Time, published in 2006.

== Works ==
- Crime as Destiny: A Study of Criminal Twins Paperback – Scott-Townsend Publishers, October 1, 1996 (Introduction)
- Race, Genetics & Society: Glayde Whitney on the Scientific and Social Policy Implications of Racial Differences Paperback – Scott-Townsend Publishers (November 7, 2002) (Editor, foreword)
- The Open Borders Network: How a Web of Ethnic Activists, Journalists, Corporations, Politicians, and Clergy Undermine U.S. Border Security and National Sovereignty, The Representative Government Press, January 1, 2009 (Sole Author)
