= Drew Fraser =

Canadian academic (b. 1944)

Andrew William Fraser (also known as Drew Fraser, born 1944) is a Canadian-born academic and was an associate professor in the Department of Public Law at Macquarie University in Sydney, New South Wales, Australia. Fraser holds a BA (Hons) and an LLB from Queen's University, an LLM from Harvard University, and an MA from the University of North Carolina. He is notable for his opposition to non-white immigration and support of white nationalist policies, such as a revival of the White Australia policy.

== Academic career ==
Fraser studied advanced constitutional law at Harvard Law School. He taught American constitutional history at Macquarie University in Sydney until 2005.

== Views ==
=== Non-white immigration and multiculturalism ===
In July 2005, Fraser received national attention in Australia with a letter to his local newspaper, signed with his academic title, in which he claimed that importing Sudanese refugees threatened to turn Australia into "a colony of the Third World" and "Experience everywhere in the world shows us that an expanding black population is a sure-fire recipe for increases in crime, violence and other social problems".

Macquarie University responded that it distanced itself from Fraser's remarks, but backed the right of academics to say what they wish in a responsible way. The acting vice-chancellor, John Loxton, stated there was no place for racism at the university, but it "recognises and protects academic freedom as essential to the conduct of teaching, research and scholarship".

Fraser was accused of being affiliated with white supremacist groups, including the Patriotic Youth League (PYL), by the anti-racist group FightDemBack. Although both he and the PYL initially denied any connection, Fraser admitted he had attended PYL meetings and signed up to the PYL website after video footage of a PYL member describing him as an official legal adviser surfaced.

Following an outcry from Sydney's Sudanese community, Macquarie University Vice-Chancellor Dianne Yerbury on 29 July 2005 decided to suspend Fraser from teaching any further at the campus on the grounds that the race debate was "threatening to spill over into the classroom" and was "affecting the university's ability to operate effectively." Macquarie University offered to pay out the final year of his contract but Fraser declined, describing the offer as a "dishonorable discharge".

In August 2005, more than 300 Macquarie University staff and students attended a forum on racism and free speech, at which Fraser (as well as Sudanese community and University members) was allowed to put his views from the floor.

Fraser's suspension ended in mid-2006, when an early-retirement package took effect.

In September 2005, Fraser wrote an article advocating a return of the White Australia Policy, entitled "Rethinking the White Australia Policy". The article was set to be published in the law journal of Deakin University, but the university directed the journal not to publish it. "Rethinking the White Australia Policy" has since been published and circulated across the internet.

A complaint from the Sydney Sudanese community about the original newspaper letter was upheld on 31 March 2006 by the Human Rights and Equal Opportunity Commission, on whose direction Fraser reluctantly apologised for his remarks.

Fraser addressed the American Renaissance Conference in February 2006, alongside speakers such as Nick Griffin of the British National Party and J. Philippe Rushton. This was followed up later in the year with appearances at the Inverell political forum in March and at the Sydney Forum in August alongside speakers who included Jim Saleam of the Australia First Party.

== Writings ==
Fraser has written numerous articles on white nationalist topics for publications such as VDARE, Alternative Right, and The Occidental Observer.

In 2011 Fraser published The WASP Question, in which he claims that Anglo-Saxon peoples in North America, Australia and elsewhere have failed to defend their ethnic identity and interests in the postmodern, multicultural age.

== Selected works ==
=== Books ===
- The Spirit of the Laws: Republicanism and the Unfinished Project of Modernity (1990)
- Reinventing Aristocracy: The Constitutional Reformation of Corporate Governance (1998)
- The WASP Question: An Essay on the Biocultural Evolution, Present Predicament, and Future Prospects of the Invisible Race (2011)
- Dissident Dispatches: An Alt-Right Guide to Christian Theology (2017)

=== Articles ===
- "Reinventing a Ruling Class". Telos 128 (Summer 2004). New York: Telos Press
