= Ken Hanson =

Ken Hanson may refer to:

- Ken Hanson (academic) (born 1953), associate professor in the University of Central Florida Judaic Studies Program
- Ken Hanson (cyclist) (born 1982), American cyclist
