= Occidental Observer =

American far-right online publication

Coordinates: 42°21′41″N 122°51′36″W

The Occidental Observer
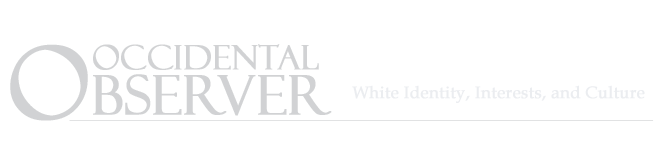
- Website type: White nationalist, antisemitic online cultural magazine
- Available in: English
- Headquarters: 1750 Delta Waters Rd; Ste 102; Medford, OR 97504-9181; United States
- Editor: Kevin B. MacDonald
- Parent: The Occidental Quarterly
- Website: www.theoccidentalobserver.net
- Launched: October 2007 (18 years ago)
- Current status: active

The Occidental Observer is an American white nationalist and antisemitic online publication that covers politics and society from a far-right perspective. It is run by the Charles Martel Society. Kevin B. MacDonald, a retired American professor of evolutionary psychology, is its editor. It is an offshoot of The Occidental Quarterly.

== Racist and antisemitic content ==
The Anti-Defamation League (ADL) says that The Occidental Observer "has become a primary voice for anti-Semitism from far-right intellectuals." Among the articles it cites as evidence for this are a September 24, 2008 article titled "The Sandra Bernhard Monstrosity" which charged that "hostility to whites and to Christianity is a mainstream Jewish phenomenon", and a September 12, 2008 article titled "The Washington Post's Willing Executioner?" which, according to the ADL, "argued that that Jews want to exterminate American whites."

A 2015 article in The New York Times examining the use of websites by white supremacists said that "Several organizations—the National Policy Institute, American Renaissance, the Charles Martel Society and its website The Occidental Observer—try to take a more highbrow approach, couching white nationalist arguments as academic commentary on black inferiority, the immigration threat to whites and other racial issues."

The Occidental Observer's mission statement says it presents "original content touching on the themes of white identity, white interests, and the culture of the West" and that it was founded to promote the perspective of white people as an ethnic group. Its editor, MacDonald, is known for asserting that "Jews engage in an evolutionary strategy that enhances their ability to outcompete others for resources." He has also regularly argued that Jews "are a hostile elite in American society" who seek to undermine "traditional European roots of American society by fostering measures that have led to increased nonwhite immigration into the United States."

The website has praised the Spartans' ideals of racial superiority and eugenics. The publication also posts transphobic content.

== Contributors ==
- Virginia Abernethy
- Alain de Benoist
- Kevin DeAnna
- James Edwards
- Drew Fraser
- Richard Hanania, under the pseudonym "Richard Hoste"
- Alex Kurtagić
- Kevin Lamb
- Kevin B. MacDonald
- Richard McCulloch
- Merlin Miller
- Richard B. Spencer
- Tomislav Sunić
- Martin Webster

== See also ==
- American Renaissance
