= Alfred S. Regnery =

American lawyer

- Born: November 21, 1942 (age 83); Chicago, Illinois, U.S.
- Education: Beloit College; University of Wisconsin Law School
- Occupations: Magazine publisher, writer, lawyer
- Parent: Henry Regnery
- Relatives: William H. Regnery (paternal grandfather); William Regnery II (cousin)

Alfred S. Regnery (born November 21, 1942) is an American conservative lawyer, former magazine publisher, and writer.

== Background ==
Alfred S. Regnery was born on November 21, 1942, in Chicago. He is the son of Henry Regnery (1912–1996), founder of Regnery Publishing, a conservative publishing house founded in 1947.

Regnery graduated from Beloit College in Beloit, Wisconsin, in 1965 and received a J.D. from the University of Wisconsin Law School in Madison, Wisconsin, in 1971.

== Career ==
Early in his career, Regnery served as college director of the Young Americans for Freedom, as a Senate aide, and the Lands Division of the U.S. Department of Justice under President Ronald Reagan.

In 1976, Regnery ran for district attorney in Madison, Wisconsin. During that campaign, his wife reported several threatening phone calls. Regnery publicized allegations to the police that his wife had been injured and forced to have sexual acts with men who had broken into their home. During the investigation, police found no evidence to substantiate the claims and allegedly discovered a "stash of pornography" in the Regnery home.

Regnery served as a legal counsel to Republican Senator Paul Laxalt of Nevada and to the United States Senate Committee on the Judiciary.

From 1981 to 1986, Regnery served as deputy assistant attorney general of the Land and Natural Resources Division of the United States Department of Justice. In 1983, he was appointed by President Ronald Reagan as administrator of the Office of Juvenile Justice and Delinquency Prevention, and he worked on the Meese Report. On May 21, 1986, Regnery resigned his position as administrator "abruptly" to return to the family business.

Regnery was president of Regnery Publishing from 1986 to 2003. In 1993, he sold Regnery Publishing to Eagle Publishing and took a board position at Eagle. (Eagle Publishing was owned by Tom Philips, a Republican donor.) He was also a partner at the Washington, D.C.–based law firm Keller and Heckman LLP until 2003.

From 2003 to 2012, Regnery was the publisher of The American Spectator.

Regnery is managing director of the Paul Revere Project for Salem Eagle, a subsidiary of Salem Communications (which also bought the Regnery imprint) and has served on Salem Eagle's board since 1993.

Regnery founded Republic Book Publishers in 2019.

== Associations ==
In 1995, Regnery co-founded the Law Enforcement Legal Defense Fund; in 2014, he became chairman of its board, which included Edwin Meese III, J. Kenneth Blackwell, Ron Hosko, and Ken Cuccinelli as directors. Currently, he serves as chairman of the Board of Trustees of the Intercollegiate Studies Institute.

Regnery served as trustee of the Philadelphia Society from 2011 to 2014.

Other entities with which he has been associated include the Committee for Western Civilization, American Foreign Policy Council, Americans for Tax Reform, Intercollegiate Studies Institute, International Policy Forum, Institute of World Politics, Fitzgerald Griffin Foundation, Leadership Institute, Westminster Institute, White House Writers Group, Hillsdale College, Morton Blackwell, James Lucier Jr., Robert R. Reilly, Robert Schadler, and Howard Segermark.

== Personal life ==
In 1969, Regnery married Christina S. Sparrow, who died in 2007; they had four children.

His cousin was William Regnery II, political activist and donor, founder of the National Policy Institute (NPI), and employer (through NPI) of Richard B. Spencer.

== Works ==
- U.S. direct marketing law: the complete handbook for managers with Richard J. Leighton (1993)
- Upstream: The Ascendance of American Conservatism (2008)
- Unlikely pilgrim (2019)
