= The Occidental Quarterly =

American white nationalist magazine

- Editor: Kevin B. MacDonald
- Categories: Political magazine
- Frequency: Quarterly
- Publisher: Charles Martel Society
- First issue: Fall 2001 (25 years ago)
- Country: United States
- Based in: Atlanta, Georgia
- Language: English
- Website: www.toqonline.com
- ISSN: 1539-3925
- OCLC: 49491983

The Occidental Quarterly is an American white nationalist magazine published by the Charles Martel Society. Its stated purpose is to defend "the cultural, ethnic, and racial interests of Western European peoples" and examine "contemporary political, social, and demographic trends that impact the posterity of Western Civilization".

The Southern Poverty Law Center calls it a "racist journal", while historian Tony Taylor describes the publication as a "far-right, racially obsessed US magazine". The Anti-Defamation League has referred to it as one of the primary publications promoting far-right antisemitism. David Frum and Max Blumenthal have called it pseudo-scholarly or pseudo-academic. The World Weekly describes the magazine as a "stalwart" of the alt-right movement in the United States.

== Publisher and editors ==
The journal is published by the Charles Martel Society (not to be confused with France's anti-Algerian Charles Martel Group), named in honor of Charles Martel, who halted a Muslim invasion of Europe at the Battle of Tours in 732.

The editor of The Occidental Quarterly is Kevin B. MacDonald. Its publisher was William Regnery II. Editorial advisory board members include Virginia Abernethy, Richard Lynn, James C. Russell and Kevin B. MacDonald. Jared Taylor, of the American Renaissance magazine, is a past member. Samuel T. Francis was an associate editor until his death.

In response to a critical essay by The American Prospect which said that "Sitting on the Occidental's advisory board is a who's who of the national anti-immigration movement", Regnery defended the editorial board, stating: "Of the thirteen individuals on its editorial board, ten hold Ph.D.s and two others are editors of their own publications. All are respected writers in their own fields."

== Positions ==
They explicitly reject neoconservatism and call for a "third school" to emerge from paleoconservatism in the form of an ideology of Western European identity politics, and hold that the American political order of freedom and liberty is under ethnic and ideological threat. Its foreign policy positions, broadly, are anti-immigration with the exception of "selected people of European ancestry" and non-interventionism, including the rejection of influence from Israel and Mexico on U.S. politics.

== Other projects ==
The Occidental Quarterly also runs a news-related website, The Occidental Observer, launched in 2007 as an online companion to the Quarterly, as well as a book publishing company, The Occidental Press. The Occidental Observer states that its mission is to "present original content touching on the themes of white identity, white interests, and the culture of the West." The Anti-Defamation League (ADL) has referred to it as "a primary voice for anti-Semitism from far-right intellectuals."

According to Newsweek magazine, in 2004 the publisher Regnery announced to the magazine's subscribers his plans for a whites-only dating Web site. Newsweek reported that Regnery was concerned about a declining numbers of whites in the population, and quoted him telling his subscribers that the dating site was important "since the survival of our race depends upon our people marrying, reproducing and parenting." Regnery defended the whites-only matchmaking idea, insisting that it is no different from sites run for Jewish singles, such as JDate.

== See also ==
- Council of Conservative Citizens
- National Policy Institute
- VDARE
