= Nathan Cofnas =

American philosopher (born 1987)

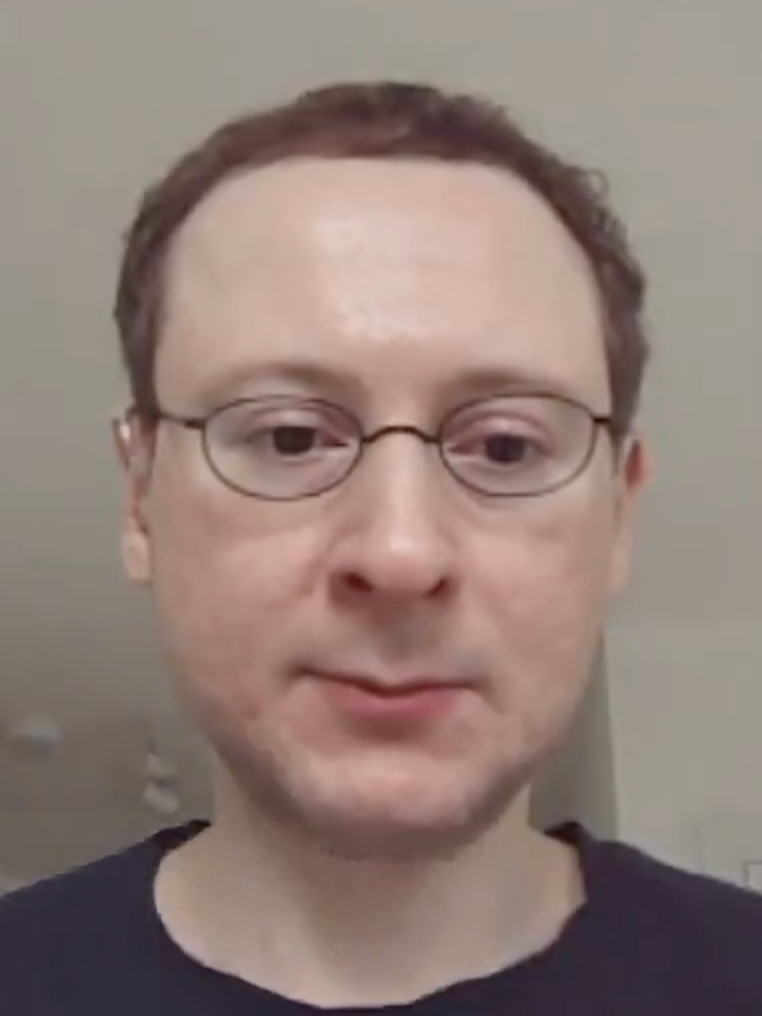
- Cofnas in 2023
- Born: 1987 (age 38–39); Chicago, Illinois, U.S.
- Occupation: Postdoctoral researcher

Academic background
- Education: Columbia University (BA); Lingnan University (attended); Darwin College, Cambridge (MPhil); Balliol College, Oxford (DPhil)
- Thesis: Evolutionary Explanations and the Debunking of Moral Beliefs (2020)
- Doctoral advisor: Guy Kahane; Andreas L. Mogensen

Academic work
- Discipline: Philosophy
- Sub-discipline: Philosophy of biology; Ethics
- Website: nathancofnas.com

Nathan Cofnas (born 1987) is an American philosopher and postdoctoral researcher at Ghent University in Belgium. He is known for controversies surrounding his advocacy of scientific racism.

Cofnas earned a DPhil in philosophy from Oxford University in 2020, and thereafter, a Leverhulme Trust research grant. He became an early-career research fellow at the University of Cambridge and research associate at Emmanuel College, Cambridge in 2022. After it was publicized in 2024 that Cofnas had written in a blog post that black people are, on average, less intelligent than other groups, and that they "would disappear from almost all high-profile positions outside of sports and entertainment" under a meritocratic system, he was dismissed from his position at Emmanuel College.

In 2026, Cofnas secured a position at Ghent University. In response to student protest and a petition calling for his dismissal, the university defended his appointment, citing academic freedom. Cofnas attracted attention after publishing a blog post in which he alleged plagiarism by University of Cambridge sociologist Jason Arday, who was found dead soon after resigning from his professorship. In August 2026, Cofnas was suspended from his position at Ghent University, pending investigation.

== Early life and education ==
Cofnas was born in Chicago, Illinois, in 1987. He was raised Jewish and grew up in Manhattan. He developed an interest in hereditarianism when he was sixteen and taking courses at Columbia University. Also while a teenager, he developed an interest in debunking the work of anti-semitic conspiracy theorist and evolutionary psychology professor Kevin MacDonald; he said later that an academic mentor recommended he not write about it.

Cofnas earned a BA from Columbia in 2011, then studied at Lingnan University in Hong Kong. He took a MPhil from Cambridge and a DPhil in philosophy from Oxford in 2020.

== Academic career ==
=== Early career ===
Cofnas wrote a book titled Reptiles with a Conscience: The Coevolution of Religious and Moral Doctrine, published in 2012 by Richard Lynn's Ulster Institute for Social Research, a British race and intelligence think tank. Cofnas later withdrew the book from publication, hoping to publish it in future work. In 2016, he attended the controversial London Conference on Intelligence.

In 2018, Cofnas argued in Human Nature that Kevin MacDonald's work promoting antisemitic tropes relied upon "misrepresented sources and cherry-picked facts" and that the "evidence actually favors a simpler explanation of Jewish overrepresentation in intellectual movements involving Jewish high intelligence and geographic distribution."

In 2019, Cofnas published a journal article in Philosophical Psychology arguing for the study of race and intelligence. Nine academics published a joint letter in Philosophical Psychology stating that his paper was not up to academic publishing standards, and was faulty in its methodology, in part by ignoring major studies that disproved his position. They also stated his paper had "racist ideological undertones" and "can reasonably be read as pandering to proponents of scientific racism". Philosophical Psychology editor Cees van Leeuwen later resigned over the controversy. Mitchell Herschbach, editor-in-chief of the journal, later published an editor's note recognizing flaws with the peer-review process that allowed Cofnas' paper to be published assuring that the journal will "implement procedural improvements so that, going forward, the journal better handles papers on controversial topics having sensitive moral and socio-political implications."

=== Emmanuel College, Cambridge ===
After receiving a Leverhulme Early Career Fellowship grant in 2022, Cofnas became an early-career research fellow in the faculty of philosophy at Cambridge, where he taught philosophy of biology. He also became a research associate at Emmanuel College.

Cofnas describes himself as a "race realist", a euphemism for a proponent of scientific racism. In a 2024 blog post, Cofnas had written that in a meritocratic system, black people "would disappear from almost all high-profile positions outside of sports and entertainment". Shortly after, a petition called for his firing and prompted investigations by the institutions associated with him. 58 Emmanuel students filed formal complaints against him. The investigations were opposed by prominent academics, including Steven Pinker and Peter Singer, on the grounds of freedom of speech. The University's investigation concluded that certain remarks in the blog post risked breaching its free speech policy, since they could encourage discrimination against black staff and students and might foster a racially hostile environment, though the University did not find that his conduct amounted to discrimination or harassment. Cofnas resigned his teaching and examining responsibilities after the backlash. Emmanuel College dismissed him, finding that his blog post amounted to a "rejection of diversity, equity, and inclusion" and was inconsistent with the college's mission. Cofnas, with support from the Free Speech Union and £85,000 in donations, sued Emmanuel College in August 2024 for belief discrimination over his dismissal. The court found his beliefs were legally protected but ruled the dismissal was proportionate, finding the blog post's impact had been "immediate and significant" and had caused harm and reputational damage. As of August 2026, he was appealing the decision.

=== Ghent University ===
Cofnas was hired as a postdoctoral researcher by Ghent University in 2026. In response, students protested while a petition objected to his views and called for his firing. The university defended his appointment, saying his statements did not violate the law or their ethical code. In a statement, the university said: "We oppose this attack on academic freedom. While we are not endorsing any specific claims Cofnas has made, we believe that academics must be able to put forward controversial or provocative claims without fear of losing their employment."

In July 2026, Cofnas publicly accused University of Cambridge sociology professor Jason Arday of plagiarism in his doctoral thesis. Arday had in 2023 become the youngest black professor in the University's history. In a Substack post, Cofnas wrote that he had run Arday's doctoral thesis through plagiarism detection software and found that "many passages are lifted with minimal editing, sometimes retaining copy-editing mistakes from the original source". He also cast doubt on some other claims Arday had made about his life. Cofnas told Retraction Watch he began scrutinizing Arday's work after he was contacted by a Cambridge faculty member who believed that the University had not responded adequately to previous plagiarism allegations against Arday. His accusations were followed by reports by The Telegraph and The Guardian, and the controversy became the subject of significant attention in British media and on Twitter. Cofnas later joked that the Arday incident is "what happened if you don’t give Cofnas a job. ... After the revolution, I'll be the head of the department of eugenics and race science at Harvard." Arday denied the accusations but later resigned as a result of the scandal, which he said had resulted in "an unrelenting level of public scrutiny and personal attack". Shortly after his resignation, Arday was found dead at his London home.

On August 20, 2026, Cofnas was suspended from Ghent University as part of a preliminary disciplinary investigation. Over 800 academics signed an open letter opposing his suspension, suggesting it was retaliation for exposing misconduct, while a counter-letter started by Ghent University researchers condemning Cofnas and supporting the university's investigation was signed by 4,500 academics. On August 28, 2026, Ghent University stated that Cofnas could resume academic activities on the condition that he worked remotely and not engage in any teaching while investigations are pending. Ghent University said it had been in contact with U.S. ambassador to Belgium, Bill White, about the Cofnas case. Cofnas thanked White for taking an interest.

In September 2026, the Belgian Centre for Equal Opportunities and Opposition to Racism (Unia) announced it plans to take legal action against Cofnas, alleging that his public statements violated Belgian anti-racism laws.

In October 2026, student supporters of Reform UK at Oxford University's Oriel College were urged to cancel a proposed evening event with Cofnas. The event on 17 November 2026 went ahead while attracting hundreds of protesters opposed to Cofnas's appearance.

== See also ==
- Noah Carl

== Bibliography ==
- Cofnas, Nathan (2012). Reptiles with a Conscience: The Coevolution of Religious and Moral Doctrine. Ulster Institute for Social Research.
- ——— (March 10, 2018). "Judaism as a Group Evolutionary Strategy: A Critical Analysis of Kevin MacDonald's Theory". Human Nature. 29 (2): 134–156. doi:10.1007/s12110-018-9310-x. ISSN 1045-6767. PMC 5942340. PMID 29526014.
- ——— (January 2, 2020). "Research on group differences in intelligence: A defense of free inquiry". Philosophical Psychology. 33 (1): 125–147. doi:10.1080/09515089.2019.1697803. ISSN 0951-5089.
