= Adrianne Black =

American former white supremacist (born 1989)

- Black in 2026
- Born: 1989 (age 36–37); Florida, United States
- Education: New College of Florida (BA); Western Michigan University (MA); University of Chicago (MA)
- Relatives: Don Black (father)
- Website: adriannefblack.com

Adrianne Black (born Derek Roland Black, 1989) is an American memoirist and former white supremacist. She is the child of Don Black, founder of the Stormfront online community, and godchild of former Ku Klux Klan Grand Wizard David Duke. Black publicly renounced white nationalism and chronicled her personal journey away from her family's beliefs.

== Early life and education ==
Adrianne Black was born in Florida in 1989 and grew up in West Palm Beach. She attended public school until third grade, when her parents took her out of school because her black teacher said the word "ain't". She was homeschooled and her education was centered on her family's beliefs.

At 10 years old, Black began learning web development, which later helped her create a page on the Stormfront site for children with similar ideas to hers. She started a dedicated Lord of the Rings section on the site. She would receive critical emails and death threats, but her father would tell her not to look at the messages, and Black has said that she was not bothered by what critics were sending her. From 2010 to 2013, she and her father hosted a radio show, the Don and Derek Black show, on Florida radio station WPBR/1340 AM, a white nationalist radio show covering national and local news.

After finishing high school, she enrolled in a community college and decided to run for a seat on the Republican executive committee. At 19 years old, she won the seat – one of 111 seats – with about 60 percent of the vote. However, the committee refused to seat Black.

She later decided that she had an interest in studying medieval European history, so in 2010, she went to the New College of Florida in Sarasota. The college was about a four-hour drive across the state and it was Black's first time away from her home. She says of her first semesters: "I'd get up in the morning, and call into my dad's radio show ... and talk about the news ... and then go to class and hang out with people who were often strong social justice advocates, and trying to live both of those lives was terrifying because I knew that one day somebody was going to type my name into Google." She later obtained Masters degrees from Western Michigan University and the University of Chicago (U of C), and subsequently became a Ph.D. student at the U of C.

== Former beliefs ==
Until leaving home, Black's worldview had developed within the insular world of white nationalism where there was never doubt about what whiteness meant in the U.S. She was known for her suspicion of other races, the U.S. government, tap water, and pop culture. At age 10, she stated: "it is a shame how many White minds are wasted in that system". She told peers at New College that she was pro-choice on abortion, against the death penalty, and did not support the KKK or Nazism or white supremacy. Instead, Black emphasized that there was a difference between white nationalism and white supremacy, saying her only concern was with "massive immigration and forced integration" and how it would lead to white genocide. She said she respected rights of all races but felt that they would be better off in their own homelands, not living together.

== Renunciation of white nationalism ==
Once her beliefs – and ongoing participation in promoting them – became public knowledge at college, she was ostracized by most of the campus community. In May 2013, Black befriended several Jews on campus. She gradually realized that her own beliefs were wrong after attending multiple Friday night Shabbat dinners with Jewish friends.

She recalled of these dinners:

I would say, "This is what I believe about I.Q. differences, I have 12 different studies that have been published over the years, here’s the journal that's put this stuff together, I believe that this is true, that race predicts I.Q. and that there were I.Q. differences in races." And they would come back with 150 more recent, more well researched studies and explain to me how statistics works and we would go back and forth until I would come to the end of that argument and I'd say, Yes that makes sense, that does not hold together and I'll remove that from my ideological toolbox but everything else is still there. And we did that over a year or two on one thing after another until I got to a point where I didn’t believe it anymore.

In 2013, Black wrote a public statement to the Southern Poverty Law Center, publicly renouncing her views. In a 2017 interview, she said: "I wanted them to know that I understood what we believed, and I was systematically disbelieving each point."

When Don Black learned of Adrianne's renunciation of his beliefs, he began to distance himself from Adrianne, not being sure whether to defend her or to shun her completely. Adrianne tried to convince her father to re-examine his beliefs, but failed.

In May 2024, Adrianne released a memoir titled The Klansman's Son: My Journey from White Nationalism to Antiracism. In the book, Adrianne came out as transgender, using they/them and she/her pronouns. As of March 2025, Black exclusively uses she/her pronouns.

== Family ==
Black's mother, Chloe Black, is an executive assistant for the founder of the Florida Crystals company and owns a real estate business in South and Central American countries. She has also served as spokeswoman for a charter school, Glades Academy in Pahokee, Florida, financed by Florida Crystals with the aim of lifting minority children out of poverty. Before her marriage to Don Black, she was married to David Duke.

Adrianne Black's father, Don Black, who founded the website Stormfront, remains a white supremacist. He was also a Grand Wizard in the Ku Klux Klan, and a member of the American Nazi Party in the 1970s (for a time, the ANP was known as the National Socialist White Peoples' Party). In 1981, he was convicted of attempting an overthrow of the government of the island country of Dominica using firearms and served three years in jail, from 1981 to 1984.

== Bibliography ==
- The Klansman's Son: My Journey from White Nationalism to Antiracism (2024)

== See also ==
- Talk radio
- List of white nationalist organizations
