= Charles Martel Society =

American white nationalist advocacy organization

- Named after: Charles Martel
- Formation: 2001 (25 years ago)
- Founder: William Regnery II
- Type: nonprofit
- Tax ID no.: 36-4397594
- Legal status: 501(c)(3)
- Purpose: civil policy advocacy
- Headquarters: PO box 8127; Atlanta, GA 31106-0127; United States
- President: James Edwards (Note: Edwards became president in 2022)
- Chairman: James Edwards (Note: Edwards became chairman in 2022)
- Key people: Martin Kenneth O'Toole former President former Chairman Trustee; Sam Dickson Trustee
- Revenue: $78,662 (Note: IRS Form-990 yr2019) (2019)
- Expenses: $100,296 (2019)

The Charles Martel Society is an American white nationalist organization that publishes The Occidental Quarterly, a prominent scientific racist publication formatted to look like a peer-reviewed journal. It also publishes the Occidental Observer, which the Anti-Defamation League (ADL) notes as a prominent online outlet for antisemitism. The Society also runs the book-publishing house the Occidental Press. The Society was founded in 2001 and is based in Atlanta, Georgia. It is classified as a hate group by the Southern Poverty Law Center. The ADL has also classified it as being white supremacist.

== History ==
The Charles Martel Society was founded as a nonprofit organization in 2001 by William Regnery II, an heir to the Regnery Publishing fortune. The organization is named after Charles Martel, who successfully defended Francia against an army of Muslim invaders at the Battle of Tours. It formed the basis for the National Policy Institute, which was founded by Regnery and some of his associates in 2005.

Martin Kenneth O'Toole was both the president and chairman of the board of trustees from 2015 through 2021. He has been succeeded in 2022 (as both president and chairman) by James Edwards. O'Toole remains as a trustee of the organization.
