= William H. Regnery =

American businessman and isolationist (1877–1954)

William Henry Regnery
- Born: October 12, 1877; Sheboygan, Wisconsin, U.S.
- Died: January 16, 1954 (aged 76)
- Occupation: businessman
- Known for: America First Committee founding member
- Spouse(s): Francis Susan Thrasher (m. 30 June 1903)
- Children: 5
- Parent(s): Wilhelm Regnery; Johanna Jung
- Relatives: Henry Francis Regnery (son); Alfred S. Regnery (grandson); William Henry Regnery II (grandson)

William Henry Regnery (October 12, 1877 – January 16, 1954) was an American businessman.

== Background ==
William H. Regnery was born in Sheboygan, Wisconsin, on October 12, 1877. His father, Wilhelm, immigrated to the United States from Ensch, Germany, and the family of his mother, Johanna (née Jung), had been in the country one generation longer. The family moved to St. Lucas, Iowa, when he was very young. The family was Roman Catholic. He received his early education in Iowa and later became involved in various business ventures, including agriculture and manufacturing. His interest in economics and social reform shaped his later affiliations with progressive and populist movements.

== Career ==
=== Business ===
Regnery enjoyed a successful career in the manufacturing business. In 1936, he was heading the Western Shade Cloth Company, based in Chicago. William H. Regnery built his fortune through textile manufacturing and industrial operations in Illinois. His business activities were centered around modern production systems, labor management, and factory efficiency — reflecting the early industrial boom in the American Midwest.

He was recognized for adopting innovative business practices and was respected among his peers as a forward-thinking entrepreneur. His economic success enabled him to later support various educational and reformist initiatives, showcasing his belief that business should also serve broader societal goals.

His legacy in business continued through the family line, particularly in publishing and ideological activism, which became prominent in the later 20th century through Regnery Publishing, founded by his son Henry Regnery.

=== Politics ===
In his youth, Regnery attached himself to a variety of social reform movements and was particularly devoted to the ideas of Henry George.

Regnery supported Franklin Roosevelt in the U.S. presidential elections of 1932 and 1936. In the 1936 election, during a radio broadcast sponsored by the Democratic National Committee, he said: "It is my firm and honest belief that we are in the prosperous and enviable position we occupy today as a direct result of the policies which his administration put into operation to rescue the industrial and agricultural populations of our country from disaster and ruin." He grew estranged from the New Deal in the late 1930s, objecting both to the growth of the government's role in the domestic economy and Roosevelt's internationalism that indicated the U.S. could intervene in a European military conflict.

Regnery was among the founders of the America First Committee, attending one of its organizing sessions in Chicago along with General Robert E. Wood and Alice Roosevelt Longworth. He served on its National Committee and helped finance it as well. Following World War II, he was the principal source of financial support for the Foundation for Foreign Affairs, a research and public education enterprise formed to promote a policy of non-intervention and support for German redevelopment rather than European-wide assistance.

== Personal life and death ==
Regnery married Francis Susan Thrasher in Kansas City on June 30, 1903. He was the father of conservative publisher Henry Regnery (1912–1996) and grandfather of white supremacist William Regnery II (1941-2021). Grandchildren include Alfred S. Regnery.

Regnery died on January 16, 1954.

== See also ==
- America First Committee
- American Friends Service Committee
- Henry Francis Regnery (son)
- William Henry Regnery II (grandson)
- Alfred S. Regnery (grandson)
