= Ken Hanson (Judaist) =

American scholar and academic

Kenneth L. Hanson (born 1953) is an associate professor in the University of Central Florida Judaic Studies Program, in Orlando, Florida. Dr. Hanson has authored books on the Dead Sea Scrolls, Kabbalah and lost books of the Bible. He is a regular contributor on the History Channel, and has also appeared on the radio show Coast to Coast AM as a guest numerous times.

== Education ==
Hanson studied history at the University of Illinois at Chicago. During his undergraduate studies he also spent time studying in Israel. Hanson later earned a master’s degree in international/intercultural communication and television. He received his Ph.D. from the University of Texas at Austin in 1991.

== Career ==
Hanson spent two years in the United States Army, after which he worked in newsgathering and broadcast television. Hanson has taught for many years at the University of Central Florida where he currently holds the Tess and Abe Wise Endowed Professorship in Judaic Studies. His research focuses on the Second Jewish Commonwealth, the Dead Sea Scrolls, the historical Jesus, and Jewish Christianity.

== Honors and awards ==
In 2017 Hanson won the Chuck D. Dziuban Award for Excellence in Online Teaching.

== Personal life ==
Hanson was raised as an evangelical Christian, but converted to Judaism as an adult.

== Publications ==
- Teaching the Shoah: Mandate and Momentum. Cambridge Scholars Publishing, 2023. (Co-edited with Zev Garber).
- The Annotated Passover Haggadah. GCRR Press, 2021. (Co-edited with Zev Garber).
- Judaism and Jesus. Cambridge Scholars Publishing, 2020. (Co-authored with Zev Garber).
- The Eagle and The Bible: Lessons in Liberty from Holy Writ. New English Review Press, 2012.
- Blood Kin of Jesus: James and the Lost Jewish Church. Council Oaks Books, 2009.
- Secrets from the Lost Bible. Council Oaks Books, 2006.
- Essene Book of Everyday Virtues: Spiritual Wisdom From the Dead Sea Scrolls. Council Oaks Books, 2006.
- Kabbalah: 3000 Years of Mystic Tradition. Council Oaks Books, 1998.
- Dead Sea Scrolls: The Untold Story. Council Oaks Books, 1997.
