= John Hartung =

American academic

John Hartung (born 1947) is a Professor of anesthesiology at the State University of New York. His BA is from the University of Pennsylvania and his PhD is from Harvard University in anthropology. He is the former Associate Editor of the Journal of Neurosurgical Anesthesiology.

He has also published some widely cited work in other fields, notably some early pioneering research in human behavioral ecology on inheritance patterns and also a controversial paper in Skeptic in which he argued that biblical injunctions to 'love thy neighbour' and the Ten Commandments were, properly interpreted, intended to apply only to behavior towards fellow Jews. This latter article has been referred to favourably in popular books such as Matt Ridley's The Origins of Virtue and Richard Dawkins's bestseller The God Delusion but also, together with a favourable review of the earlier work of controversial psychologist Kevin MacDonald on Judaism, proved controversial. Nevertheless, despite criticism of Hartung's review of MacDonald's book, Dick Alexander, the then-president of the Human Behavior and Evolution Society (of which Hartung was formerly the secretary), defended Hartung.
