= Jamie Kelso =

American white supremacist

Jamie Kelso (June 8, 1948) is an American white supremacist and former Church of Scientology member of the Sea Org. He has hosted daily web radio programs, including The Jamie Kelso Show on the Voice of Reason Broadcast Network, and is a senior moderator of the white supremacist Stormfront website, where he uses the name Charles A. Lindberg. Kelso became a moderator at Stormfront in 2002 and was instrumental in its rapid growth, partially by encouraging senior figures in the white supremacist movement to post.

== Public life ==
Kelso first came to national attention when he was featured in a 1960s Time magazine article on teenagers in the suburbs of Los Angeles. By 1971, Kelso was a member of the Sea Org, but he left in 1973.

He was featured in the chapter entitled "The Idealist" in the 1976 book What Really Happened to the Class of '65? by Michael Medved and David Wallechinsky, both former high-school classmates of Kelso's. When interviewed for the book, Kelso was an ardent member of the John Birch Society.

Kelso became a moderator at Don Black's online forum Stormfront in 2002. He was instrumental in helping the forum grow from 5,000 to an estimated 203,000 members.

He was also featured in Right Turns, Medved's 2005 autobiography. He has appeared on Irish Radio in Dublin, Ireland, on The Political Cesspool, and on Fox TV in South Carolina.

He was the chairman of the May 2004 and May 2005 New Orleans conferences attended by a number of white nationalists, including Nick Griffin, chair of the British National Party; Jean-Michel Girard, Directeur de cabinet des affaires etrangères of the Front National of France; and Lady Michele Renouf from the UK. Kelso lived at David Duke's headquarters in St. Tammany Parish, Louisiana, during this time and worked as Duke's assistant. He also organized an April 2004 international revisionist conference in Sacramento attended by attorney Edgar J. Steele, author of Defensive Racism; Paul Fromm, chair of the Canadian Association for Free Expression; and April Gaede and her daughters Lamb and Lynx, twin members of the band Prussian Blue.

He is membership coordinator and a director of the white supremacist American Freedom Party.
