= Jared Taylor =

American white supremacist author (born 1951)

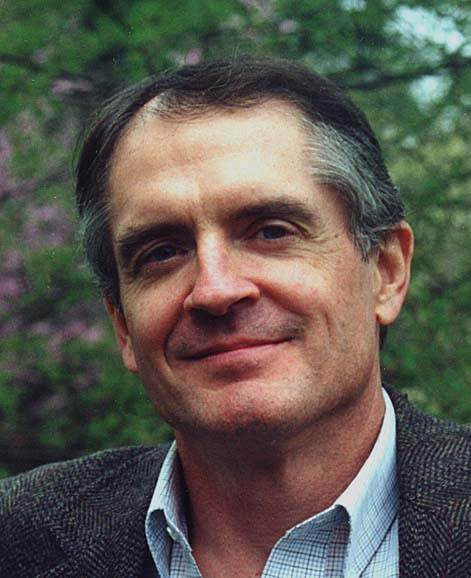
- Taylor in 2008
- Born: Samuel Jared Taylor; September 15, 1951 (age 75); Kobe, Hyōgo, Japan
- Education: Yale University (BA); Sciences Po (MA)
- Occupation: Editor of American Renaissance
- Known for: Belief in scientific racism: Advocacy for voluntary racial segregation
- Title: President of the New Century Foundation
- Movement: White supremacy
- Partner: Evelyn Rich
- Children: 2 daughters

Samuel Jared Taylor (born September 15, 1951) is an American white supremacist and editor of American Renaissance, an online magazine espousing such opinions, which was founded by Taylor in 1990.

He is also the president of American Renaissance's parent organization, New Century Foundation, through which many of his books have been published. He is a former member of the advisory board of The Occidental Quarterly and a former director of the National Policy Institute, a Virginia-based white nationalist think tank. He is also a board member and spokesperson of the Council of Conservative Citizens.

Taylor and many of his affiliated organizations have been accused of promoting racist ideologies by civil rights groups, journalists, and academics studying racism in the United States.

== Early life and education ==
Samuel Jared Taylor was born on September 15, 1951, to Christian missionary parents from Virginia in Kobe, Japan. He lived in Japan until he was 16 years old and attended Japanese schools up to the age of 12, becoming fluent in Japanese.

He attended Yale University, where he earned a Bachelor of Arts in philosophy in 1973. Taylor then spent three years in France and received a Master of Arts degree in international economics at Sciences Po in 1978. During a period that interrupted his undergraduate and later graduate college years, he worked and traveled extensively in West Africa, improving his French in the Francophone regions of the continent. Taylor is fluent in French, Japanese, and English.

== Career ==
Taylor worked as an international lending officer for the Manufacturers Hanover Corporation from 1978 to 1981, and as West Coast editor of PC Magazine from 1983 to 1988. He has also taught Japanese at the Harvard Summer School, and worked as a courtroom translator.

In the 1980s, at the time of the country's strong economic growth, Taylor was viewed as a "Japan expert" in the mainstream media. In 1983 he published a well-received book on Japanese culture and business customs entitled Shadows of the Rising Sun: A Critical View of the Japanese Miracle. While critical of certain aspects of Japanese culture, Taylor argued that Japanese society was more successful in solving social issues than the West, with lower crime rates and a similar or higher standard of living.

Sometime in his early thirties, Taylor reassessed the liberal and cosmopolitan viewpoint commonly professed in his working environment, which he had himself shared until then. He became deeply convinced that human beings are tribal in nature and feelings, and that they differ in talent, temperament and capacity. In the mid-1980s, he developed an interest in the emerging fields of evolutionary biology and evolutionary psychology, especially in the controversial works of Richard Lynn, J. Philippe Rushton and Helmuth Nyborg, and came to believe that differences between human beings are largely of genetic origin, and therefore quasi-immutable. All the social miracles of Japan, Taylor averred by 1991 under the pen name Steven Howell, were at least partly a result of Japan's racial and cultural homogeneity.

In November 1990, he founded and published the first issue of American Renaissance, a white supremacist subscription-based monthly newsletter. He created the New Century Foundation in 1994 to assist with the running of American Renaissance. Many of the early articles were written by Taylor himself and were intended to put white racial advocacy on a higher intellectual level than the traditional Klansman's or white skinhead's discourse that dominated the media at that time. The journal ceased its print publication in 2012 to focus on a daily webzine format.

In 1992, Taylor published a book titled Paved with Good Intentions in which he criticizes what he deems the unwise welfare politics that contributed to the economic situation of the African-American underclass. Unlike many of his American Renaissance articles, the work avoids genetic-based reasoning due to fears of not being able to get it published had he talked about IQ differences. In 1994, he was called by the defense team in a Fort Worth, Texas black-on-black murder trial, to give expert testimony on the race-related aspects of the case. Prior to testifying in the trial, Taylor, presented as a "race-relations expert and author" by The Washington Post, called young black men "the most dangerous people in America" and added "This must be taken into consideration in judging whether or not it was realistic for [the defendant] to think this was a kill-or-be-killed situation."

== Personal life ==
Taylor has two children with Evelyn Beatrice Mackenzie Rich; she was attacked by white nationalists accusing her of being Jewish.

== Views ==
Taylor has been described as a white nationalist, white supremacist, and racist by civil rights groups, news media, academics studying racism in the US, and others. Taylor has "strenuously rejected" being called a racist, and maintains that he is instead a "racialist who believes in race-realism." He has also disputed the white supremacist label, preferring to describe himself as a "white advocate", and contends that his views on nationality and race are "moderate, commonsensical, and fully consistent with the views of most of the great statesmen and presidents of America's past".

News coverage of Taylor has associated him with the alt-right.

=== Race ===
Taylor is a proponent of scientific racism and voluntary racial segregation. Taylor also asserts that there are racial differences in intelligence among the various ethno-racial groups across the world. Taylor argues that Blacks are generally less intelligent than Hispanics, while Hispanics are generally less intelligent than whites, and whites are generally less intelligent than East Asians.

Taylor argues that his work with American Renaissance is analogous to other groups that advocate for ethnic or racial interests. American Renaissance has been described as a white supremacist publication which exists primarily to disparage minorities. In the journal in 2005, he stated, "Blacks and whites are different. When blacks are left entirely to their own devices, Western civilization – any kind of civilization – disappears." A 2005 feature in the Pittsburgh Post-Gazette described Taylor as "a racist in the guise of expert".

Taylor presents his segregationist project as based on civil liberties and freedom of association, and has described government-mandated segregation as morally unjust. He opposes all anti-discrimination laws as unacceptable. Taylor also opposes anti-miscegenation laws as impinging on personal freedom.

Taylor says that the multi-racial American society is "doomed to failure", and that non-white groups should not constitute a significant part of the American population. He thus supports immigration policies that would favor white immigrants over other groups. Taylor has argued against the 1965 Hart-Celler Act, which decreased de facto racism in U.S. immigration policy.

Taylor supports the white genocide conspiracy theory, and has hosted the Suidlanders on his AmRen podcast to discuss the topic, while encouraging donations to the South African organization. He has recommended Jean Raspail's The Camp of the Saints to his followers.

=== Attitude towards antisemitism ===
Taylor welcomes Jews to his organization and views American Jews as potential powerful allies. While several speakers of Jewish descent have participated in American Renaissance conventions, he has never sought to either welcome or expel antisemitic voices. This position has sparked tensions with far-right antisemitic organizations claiming that Jews are infiltrating their movements. In 2006, a clash erupted at one convention between antisemitic conspiracy theorist David Duke and Michael H. Hart, a Jewish astrophysicist sharing many of Taylor's ideas. The Forward reported that Taylor "has been trying to de-Nazify the movement and draw the white nationalist circle wider to include Jews of European descent. But to many on the far right, taking the Jew-hatred out of white nationalism is like taking the Christ out of Christmas—a sacrilege."

The Southern Poverty Law Center (SPLC) comments that Taylor is unusual among the radical right in "his lack of anti-Semitism." Scholar Elizabeth Bryant Morgenstern states that "unlike many other white supremacists, Taylor is not antisemitic, and in fact encourages Jews to join his fight. ... however many within the white supremacist/anti-immigration movement disagree with Taylor ... and he has been under tremendous pressure to break ties with the Jewish community."

=== Donald Trump ===
Taylor supported Donald Trump's 2016 presidential campaign, and he recorded robocalls to support Trump before the Iowa caucus and New Hampshire primary. A spokesperson for the Trump campaign said that Trump "disavows all super PACs offering their support and continues to do so". When asked about the robocalls in 2016, Trump responded "I would disavow that, but I will tell you people are extremely angry."

Taylor believes that white voters were drawn to Donald Trump in the 2016 election specifically because of Trump's white identity politics. Taylor attended Trump's first presidential inauguration with front-row VIP tickets, and he described the event as "a sign of rising white consciousness".

== Influence ==
Madison Grant, the author of The Passing of the Great Race (1916), and Lothrop Stoddard, the author of The Rising Tide of Color (1920), each the object of celebratory articles in American Renaissance, seem to have influenced or reinforced Taylor's belief in separate racial homelands. Southern conservatives Samuel Francis and Sam Dickson, who have been regular speakers at American Renaissance conferences, are also cited as influential on Taylor's views. According to scholar Russell Nieli, "the combination of southern regional conservatism and Taylor's experience of living in ... Japan has undoubtedly had a formative effect on his thinking about race."

Hoping his ethnonationalist project will go global, Taylor has sought in recent years to establish relations with populist radical right parties in Europe such as France's National Rally, Britain's UKIP, Austria's Freedom Party, Germany's Alternative für Deutschland, and Flanders's Vlaams Belang. Nieli notes that Taylor appears to have a special intellectual affinity for the French New Right author Guillaume Faye, whose books were favorably reviewed by Taylor in American Renaissance; both of them believe that white people need to join in a worldwide fight for their racial, cultural, and demographic survival.

According to Nieli, Taylor "may well have been as central to structuring the fledgling [America's radical Right] in the 1990s as the late William F. Buckley Jr. was in the 1950s and 1960s in structuring post-World War II American conservatism. The growing Alt Right movement in America today owes a great deal to Taylor's past efforts."

== Reception ==
Mark Potok and Heidi Beirich, writers for the Intelligence Report (a publication of the Southern Poverty Law Center), have written that "Jared Taylor is the cultivated, cosmopolitan face of white supremacy. He is the guy who is providing the intellectual heft, in effect, to modern-day Klansmen." They have also stated that "American Renaissance has become increasingly important over the years, bringing a measure of intellectualism and seriousness to the typically thug-dominated world of white supremacy".

On December 18, 2017, Taylor's Twitter account (as well as the account for American Renaissance) was suspended by Twitter, after Twitter adopted new rules prohibiting accounts affiliated with the promotion of violence. In February 2018, Taylor filed a lawsuit against Twitter, claiming that the suspension violated his right to free speech. Taylor's lawsuit was dismissed, and an appeals court upheld the dismissal, agreeing that services can control what is published on their sites.

In March 2019, Taylor said on his website that he had been banned from the Schengen Area for two years at the instigation of Poland.

== Notable published works ==
- Shadows of the Rising Sun: A Critical View of the "Japanese Miracle" (William Morrow and Company, 1983, 336 pp.) ISBN 978-0-6880245-5-0
- Paved With Good Intentions: The Failure of Race Relations in Contemporary America (Carroll & Graf Publishers, 1992, 416 pp.) ISBN 978-0-8818486-6-3
- White Identity: Racial Consciousness for the 21st Century (New Century Books, 2011, 340 pp.), ISBN 978-0-9656383-9-5

== See also ==
- Ethnopluralism
