= New Century Foundation =

American white supremacist organization

- Formation: 1994 (32 years ago)
- Founder: Jared Taylor
- Type: nonprofit
- Tax ID no.: 61-6212159
- Legal status: 501(c)(3)
- Purpose: Immigration to the United States; Race and crime in the United States
- Headquarters: PO box 527; Oakton, Virginia 22124-0527; United States
- Region served: United States
- President: Jared Taylor
- Publication: American Renaissance
- Revenue: $401,917 (Note: IRS Form-990 yr2019) (2019)
- Expenses: $540,638 (2019)
- Website: www.nc-f.org

The New Century Foundation is a white supremacist organization founded in 1994 by Jared Taylor known primarily for publishing a magazine, American Renaissance, which promotes white supremacy. From 1994 to 1999, its activities received considerable funding by the Pioneer Fund. The organization also has a DBA (Note: DBA - Doing-Business-As) name of American Renaissance. (Note: DBA name as shown on IRS Form-990)

Taylor advocates racial segregation while denying that his views constitute white supremacy. He describes Japan as an exemplar of a racially homogeneous society. Taylor is a self-styled "race realist" who cites pseudoscience and other forms of scientific racism to attribute racial disparity (e.g. between blacks and whites) in socioeconomic outcomes to underlying biological ("phenotypic") differences.

== Criticism ==
Regarding Jews, the ADL writes that "Taylor eschews anti-Semitism. Seeing Jews as white, greatly influential and the 'conscience of society,' Taylor rather seeks to partner with Jews who share his views on race and racial diversity" and "Jews have been speakers or participants at all eight American Renaissance conferences" although controversy followed accusations by David Duke, who was not a scheduled presenter, at the 2006 conference.

On 29 June 2020 American Renaissance's YouTube channel and AmRen Podcasts were banned from YouTube for violations of hate speech guidelines.

== The Color of Crime ==
The Color of Crime is a publication by Jared Taylor that describes race differences in criminal delinquency in the United States. It was published as a monograph in 1999 and as revised editions in electronic form in 2005 and again in 2016. It examines US crime statistics by race and offers interpretations and policy suggestions.

According to Taylor, statistics show that African Americans and Hispanics are overrepresented among criminal offenders, while Asian Americans are underrepresented. Taylor concludes that blacks commit more white-collar crimes and hate crimes than do whites. He further argues that there is more black-on-white interracial crime than there is white-on-black crime. Taylor claims that police are not biased against blacks or other ethnic groups. He states that research into race differences in criminal behavior is a worthwhile pursuit and suggests that the US immigration policy should consider these differences.

=== Criticism ===
In The New White Nationalism in America: Its Challenge to Integration (Cambridge University Press, 2002), Carol M. Swain observed that the New Century Foundation faxed conclusions from the publication to major US newspapers, and that its stated purpose was to support the practice of racial profiling.

The Southern Poverty Law Center (SPLC) called it "a kind of Bible" among its supporters, and has argued that the reason for the disparity in crime rates shown in the book is not black genetics, but rather, the fact that blacks have a lower socioeconomic status. The SPLC accuses Taylor of selection bias in his statistics. The SPLC also argues that whites are targeted for robberies simply because of their higher wealth. Taylor counters by arguing that robberies only account for about one quarter of the total crimes committed by blacks.

Social activist and writer Tim Wise wrote an essay titled The Color of Deception as a rebuttal to The Color of Crime. His essay used data from the FBI and BJS showing that interracial crimes are actually fairly rare; that the vast majority of black (and white) crime is committed against victims of the same race; that whites still account for the majority of crime in the United States; and that part of the reason blacks are over-represented for many crime categories is their neighborhoods are generally much more heavily policed and black suspects are significantly less likely to be acquitted or released with a warning. The article also uses statistical data to argue that blacks are actually over-represented as victims of interracial violence per capita (arguing blacks are 50% more likely to be victims of interracial violence than pure chance would predict), and that overall, white criminals pose the greatest threat to white Americans and black criminals pose the greatest threat to black Americans.

In the book, Hate Crimes, Beirichs & Hicks refer to The Color of Crime as noteworthy examples of "academic racists who specialize in 'proving' the inferiority of those with dark skin".

== See also ==
- History of the race and intelligence controversy
- Race and crime in the United States
- Scientific racism
