= Stormfront (website) =

Neo-Nazi Internet forum and hate website

- Website type: Neo-Nazi forum
- Available in: English, with sub-forums in multiple languages
- Owner: Don Black
- Creator: Don Black
- Website: stormfront.org
- Commercial: No
- Registration: Required to post (except in open sub-forums)
- Launched: November 1996; 30 years ago
- Current status: Offline

Stormfront is a neo-Nazi Internet forum, and the Web's first major racial hate site. The site is focused on propagating white nationalism, Nazism, antisemitism (especially antisemitic conspiracy theories), Islamophobia, Holocaust denial and white supremacy.

Stormfront began as an online bulletin board system in the early 1990s before being established as a website in 1996 by the former Ku Klux Klan leader and white supremacist Don Black. It received national attention in the United States in 2000 after being featured as the subject of a documentary called Hate.Com. Stormfront has been the subject of controversy after being removed from French, German, and Italian Google indices; for targeting an online Fox News poll on racial segregation; and for having political candidates as members. Its prominence has grown since the 1990s, attracting attention from watchdog organizations that oppose racism and antisemitism.

In August 2017, Stormfront was taken offline for just over a month when its registrar seized its domain name due to complaints that it promoted hatred and that some of its members were linked to murder. The Lawyers' Committee for Civil Rights Under Law claimed credit for the action after advocating for Stormfront's web host, Network Solutions, to enforce its Terms of Service agreement, which prohibits users from using its services to incite violence.

== History ==
=== Early history ===
Stormfront began in 1990 as an online bulletin board supporting the white nationalist David Duke's campaign for United States senator for Louisiana. The name "Stormfront" was chosen for its connotations of a political or military front, such as the German Nazi Sturmabteilung (also known as storm troopers or SA) and an analogy with weather fronts that invokes the idea of a tumultuous storm ending in cleansing. The Stormfront website has been registered at Network Solutions since 1995 and was created in 1996 by Don Black, a former grand wizard of the Ku Klux Klan in the 1970s and a member of the National Socialist White People's Party. Black first received computer training while he was imprisoned for his role in an abortive 1981 attempt to overthrow the government of Dominica.

Although Stormfront became the first website associated with white supremacy, its founding as a private cyberspace medium for white supremacy was based on the earlier online bulletin board system Liberty Net. Liberty Net was implemented in 1984 by Klan Grand Dragon Louis Beam and protected by four password-protected computers that took the FBI two years to decrypt. Liberty Net's code-accessed message board contained personal ads along with recruitment material and information about the white power movement. Liberty Net's success as a computer platform led to Stormfront's establishment and later conversion into a website.

Until this point, attempts at using the Internet as opposed to bulletin boards have had limited success for the white pride movement, but Stormfront developed a following with the growth of the Internet during the 1990s. By 1999, nearly 2,000 websites associated with white supremacism existed, with the recruitment power of reaching millions across the United States.

=== National attention ===
The website has received considerable attention in the United States, given that, as of 2009, it had over 120,000 active members.

The 2000 CBS/HBO TV documentary special Hate.com focused on the rise of hate groups online and included input from Don Black, the founder of Stormfront. Narrated by Morris Dees of the Southern Poverty Law Center (SPLC), it featured interviews with Black and his child Adrianne as well as interviews with other white nationalist groups and organizations. Black had participated in the hope that the broadcast would show some sympathy towards the white nationalist movement, but Hate.com focused exclusively on the group's tactics and not its grievances.

=== Controversies ===
In 2002, Google complied with French and German legislation forbidding links to websites that host white supremacist, Holocaust-denying, or historical negationism material by removing Stormfront's website from their French and German indexes.

Stormfront returned to the news in May 2003, when Fox News Channel host Bill O'Reilly reported on a racially segregated prom being held in Georgia and posted a poll on his website asking his viewers if they would send their own children to one. The next night, O'Reilly announced that he could not report the results of the poll as it appeared Stormfront had urged its members to vote in the poll, thus skewing the numbers.

Doug Hanks, a candidate for the city council of Charlotte, North Carolina, withdrew his nomination in August 2005 after it was revealed that he had posted on Stormfront. Hanks had posted more than 4,000 comments over three years, including one in which he described black people as "rabid beasts". Hanks said his postings were designed to gain the trust of Stormfront users to help him write a novel: "I did what I thought I needed to do to establish myself as a credible white nationalist."

In 2012, Italian police blocked the website and arrested four people for inciting racial hatred. The measure was taken after the publication of a blacklist of "prominent Jews and people who support Jews and immigrants" on the Italian section of the website. The list included possible targets of violent attacks, including Romani camps. The subsequent year, in November 2013, Italian police raided the homes of 35 Stormfront posters. One man who was arrested in Mantua had two loaded weapons, a hand grenade casing, and a flag with a swastika in his possession.

According to a 2014 two-year study by the Southern Poverty Law Center (SPLC)'s Intelligence Report, registered Stormfront users have been disproportionately responsible for some of the most lethal hate crimes and mass killings since its founding in 1995. From 2009 to 2014, nearly 100 people were murdered by members of Stormfront. Of these, 77 were massacred by Stormfront user Anders Behring Breivik, a Norwegian terrorist and perpetrator of the 2011 Norway attacks.

=== Public profile and later history ===
The total of registered users is just shy of 300,000, a fairly astounding number for a site run by an ex-felon and former Alabama Klan leader. And that doesn't include thousands of visitors who never register as users. At press time, Stormfront ranked as the Internet's 13,648th most popular site, while the NAACP site, by comparison, ranked 32,640th. – The Year in Hate and Extremism, 2015

In a 2001 USA Today article, journalist Tara McKelvey called Stormfront "the most visited white supremacist site on the Net." The number of registered users on the site rose from 5,000 in January 2002 to 52,566 in June 2005, by which year it was the 338th largest Internet forum, receiving more than 1,500 hits each weekday and ranking in the top one percent of Internet sites in terms of use. By June 2008, the site was attracting more than 40,000 unique users each day. Operating the site from its West Palm Beach, Florida headquarters is Black's full-time job, and he was assisted by his child and 40 moderators. The public profile of the site attracted attention from groups such as the Simon Wiesenthal Center and the Anti-Defamation League (ADL). The ADL describes Stormfront as having "served as a veritable supermarket of online hate, stocking its shelves with many forms of anti-Semitism and racism".

In 2006, the Southern Poverty Law Center (SPLC) reported a discussion on Stormfront in which white nationalists were encouraged to join the United States military to learn the skills necessary for winning a race war. The 2008 United States presidential candidacy of African-American Democrat Barack Obama was a cause of significant concern for some Stormfront members: the site received 2,000 new members the day after Obama was elected as president, and went offline temporarily due to the increase in visitors. Stormfront posters saw Obama as representing a new multicultural era in the United States replacing "white rule", and feared that he would support illegal immigration and affirmative action and that he would help make white people a minority group.

During the 2008 primary campaigns, The New York Times mistakenly reported that Stormfront had donated $500 to Republican presidential hopeful Ron Paul; in fact, it was site owner Don Black who had contributed the money to Paul.

Following an April 2009 shooting, Richard Poplawski, a poster on the site, calling himself Braced for Fate, was charged with ambushing and killing three Pittsburgh police officers and attempting to kill nine others.

During the 2016 election season, site founder Don Black said that the site was experiencing huge spikes in traffic corresponding to controversial statements by Donald Trump. In response, Black upgraded the site's servers.

Black's child Adrianne, who was a long-time participant in the site, has disavowed the beliefs held by her father and family and the Stormfront site. Through her years in college, Adrianne Black came to feel that white nationalism is not supportable. Her story was captured in the book, "Rising Out of Hatred" by Eli Saslow.

In August 2017, Stormfront's domain name was seized by its registrar for "displaying bigotry, discrimination or hatred."

The site came back online on September 29, 2017. As of October 2017, services to keep the site online were provided by Tucows, Network Solutions, and Cloudflare.

As of 2026, Stormfront.org is no longer responding to attempts to access it. It's cloud-flare system is working. But, the site does not respond.

The Nazi supervillain Stormfront in the adult superhero comic series The Boys is named after the website. An alternative, genderswapped version of the character appeared in the Amazon Prime Video adaptation of the same name.

== Content ==
Stormfront is a white nationalist, white supremacist and neo-Nazi website known as a hate site.

It is a site on which Nazi mysticism and the personality cult of Adolf Hitler are sustained and Nazi iconography is used and accepted. The Stormfront website is organized primarily as a discussion forum with multiple thematic sub-forums including "News", "Ideology and Philosophy" ("Foundations for White Nationalism"), "Culture and Customs", "Theology", "Quotations", "Revisionism", "Science, Technology and Race" ("Genetics, eugenics, racial science and related subjects"), "Privacy", "Self-Defense, Martial Arts, and Preparedness", "Homemaking", "Education and Homeschooling", "Youth", and "Music and Entertainment". There are boards for different geographic regions, and a section open to unregistered guests, who are elsewhere unable to post, and even then, only under heavy moderation.

=== Services ===
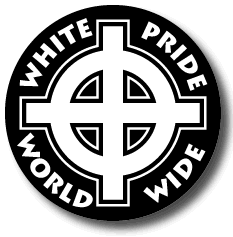
Stormfront's logo, featuring a Celtic cross surrounded by the motto "white pride world wide"

The Stormfront website hosts files from and links to a number of white nationalist and white racist websites, an online dating service (for "heterosexual White Gentiles only"), and electronic mailing lists that allows the white nationalist community to discuss issues of interest. It features a selection of current news reports, an archive of past stories, live streaming of The Political Cesspool radio show, and a merchandise store featuring literature and music. Stormfront has reportedly published stories aimed at children.

A 2001 study of recruitment by extremist groups on the Internet noted that Stormfront at that time came close to offering most of the standard services offered by web portals, including an internal search engine, web hosting, and categorized links, and lacking only an Internet search engine and the provision of free email for its members (though a limited email service was available at the price of $30 a month).

=== Design ===
Prominently featured on the homepage is a Celtic cross surrounded by the words "white pride world wide." Stormfront states it discourages racial slurs, and prohibits violent threats and descriptions of anything illegal. Others state that blatant hate and calls for violence are only kept off the opening page.

The site uses the Fraktur font, which was the favored font of the Nazi Party when it emerged in the early 1920s. Official Nazi documents and letterheads employed the font, and the cover of Adolf Hitler's Mein Kampf used a hand-drawn version of it.

== Purpose and appeal ==
Don Black has long attempted to increase the mainstream appeal of white supremacy. He established Stormfront to heighten awareness of perceived anti-white discrimination and government actions detrimental to white people, and to create a virtual community of white extremists. Black owns the site's servers, so he is not dependent upon website hosting providers.

Black's organization inculcated enough white pride to make "its worldwide aspirations meaningful and socially significant". Stormfront keeps the rhetoric in its forums muted, discourages racial slurs, and prohibits violent threats and descriptions of anything illegal. Site moderator Jamie Kelso was reportedly "the motivating force behind real community-building among Stormfront members" due to his energy and enthusiasm in organizing offline events. Black's positioning the site as a community with the explicit purpose of "defending the white race" helped sustain the community, as it attracts white people who define themselves in opposition to ethnic minorities, particularly Jews.

Stormfront established MartinLutherKing.org to discredit Martin Luther King Jr. In a 2001 study of white nationalist groups including Stormfront, academics Beverly Ray and George E. Marsh II commented: "Like the Nazis before them, they rely upon a blend of science, ignorance, and mythology to prop up their arguments".

=== Ideology ===
Stormfront presents itself as being engaged in a struggle for unity and identifies culture, speech, and free association as its core concerns, though members of Stormfront are especially passionate about racial purity. It promotes a lone wolf mentality, which links it to white nationalist theorist Louis Beam's influential work on leaderless resistance and offers a sympathetic assessment of Benjamin Nathaniel Smith, a white supremacist who committed suicide after a racially motivated killing spree in July 1999. Violet Jones notes that Stormfront credits its mission to "the founding myth of an America created, built, and ideologically grounded by the descendants of white Europeans." Don Black has specifically compared his views to those of the Founding Fathers, who, he asserts, "did not believe that an integrated black and white society was possible in America." Asked in 2008 by an interviewer for the Italian newspaper la Repubblica whether Stormfront was a 21st-century version of the Ku Klux Klan without the iconography, Black responded affirmatively, though he noted that he would never say so to an American journalist. In addition to its promotion of antisemitism and Holocaust denial, Stormfront has increasingly become active in the propagation of Islamophobia.

== See also ==
- List of white nationalist organizations
- List of Internet forums
- Racism on the Internet
