= Journal of Neurosurgical Anesthesiology =

- Discipline: Anesthesiology; Neurosurgery
- Language: English
- Edited by: Martin Smith

Publication details
- History: 1988–present
- Publisher: Wolters Kluwer
- Frequency: Quarterly
- Impact factor: 3.238 (2017)

Standard abbreviations
- ISO 4: J. Neurosurg. Anesthesiol.

Indexing
- CODEN: JNANEV
- ISSN: 0898-4921 (print); 1537-1921 (web)
- OCLC no.: 769005719

Links
- Journal homepage; Online access; Online archive

The Journal of Neurosurgical Anesthesiology is a quarterly peer-reviewed medical journal publishing research on neurosurgical anesthesia. It was established in 1988 by James E. Cottrell and John Hartung (SUNY Downstate College of Medicine), who became the journal's founding editor-in-chief and associate editor, respectively. It is published by Wolters Kluwer and the editor-in-chief is Martin Smith. It is the official journal of the Society for Neuroscience in Anesthesiology and Critical Care, the Neuroanaesthesia and Critical Care Society of Great Britain and Ireland, the Association de Neuro-Anesthésiologie Réanimation de langue Française, the Wissenschaftlicher Arbeitskreis Neuroanästhesie der Deutschen Gesellschaft fur Anästhesiologie und Intensivmedizen, the Arbeitsgemeinschaft Deutschsprachiger Neuroanästhesisten und Neuro-Intensivmediziner, the Korean Society of Neuroanesthesia, the Japanese Society of Neuroanesthesia and Critical Care, the Neuroanesthesiology Chapter of the Colegio Mexicano de Anesthesiología, the Indian Society of Neuroanesthesiology and Critical Care, and the Thai Society for Neuroanesthesia. According to the Journal Citation Reports, the journal has a 2017 impact factor of 3.238, ranking it 10th out of 31 journals in the category "Anesthesiology".
