= Don Black (white supremacist) =

American white supremacist and neo-Nazi (born 1953)

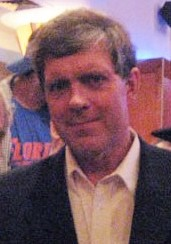
- Black in 2007

Imperial Wizard of the Knights of the Ku Klux Klan
- In office 1980–1981
- Preceded by: David Duke
- Succeeded by: Stanley McCollum

Personal details
- Born: Stephen Donald Black; July 28, 1953 (age 73) Athens, Alabama, U.S.
- Party: American Nazi (before 1984); Populist Party (1984–1996)
- Spouse: Chloe Black
- Children: Adrianne Black
- Education: University of Alabama
- Occupation: Database analyst
- Known for: Stormfront, neo-Nazism, white supremacy, antisemitism

Stephen Donald Black (born July 28, 1953) is an American white supremacist. He is the founder and webmaster of the neo-Nazi website Stormfront. He was an Imperial Wizard in the Ku Klux Klan and a member of the American Nazi Party in the 1970s, though at the time he was a member it was known as the "National Socialist White Peoples' Party". He was convicted in 1981 of attempting an armed overthrow of the government in the island of Dominica in violation of the U.S. Neutrality Act.

== Early life ==
Black was born in Athens, Alabama, and became a white supremacy advocate at an early age when he began handing out swastika-adorned pamphlets from the National Socialist White People's Party (NSWPP) at his high school, Athens High School, before transferring to Madison Academy in the fall of 1970 in order to avoid attending school with black students. This led to a decision by the local school board to ban the distribution of political literature. Black countered by mailing literature to student addresses obtained from school handbooks.

In the summer of 1970, after his junior year at Athens High School, Black traveled to Savannah, Georgia, to work on the gubernatorial campaign of J. B. Stoner, a segregationist and leader of the National States' Rights Party (NSRP). It was in this election that Jimmy Carter won the Georgia governorship. Black was asked to obtain a copy of the NSRP membership list by Robert Lloyd, a leader of the NSWPP, formerly known as the American Nazi Party. At the time, Black was a member of the Party's youth branch, the National Socialist Youth Movement.

Also working on the Stoner campaign was Jerry Ray, brother of James Earl Ray, who committed the assassination of Martin Luther King Jr. On July 25, 1970, Jerry Ray shot Black (who was 16 at the time) in the chest with a .38-caliber hollow-point bullet to stop him from taking files from Stoner's campaign office. Ray was acquitted of all charges, saying he shot in self-defense after Black reached for what appeared to be a weapon.

Black finished his senior year at Madison Academy, a private school in Huntsville. Then after high school, Black graduated from the University of Alabama in Tuscaloosa in 1975. In the early 1970s, Black traveled on a road trip to an American Nazi Party conference in Virginia with white supremacists David Duke and Joseph Paul Franklin (the latter of whom later enacted multiple white supremacist murders and terrorist attacks).

== The Ku Klux Klan and Operation Red Dog ==
Black joined the Knights of the Ku Klux Klan in 1975, one year after David Duke took over the organization. He moved to Birmingham to become the group's state organizer. After the resignation of Duke in 1980, Black became Imperial Wizard, or national director, of the Klan. In 1979, he ran for mayor of Birmingham, receiving 2.5% of the vote. Richard Arrington Jr. won the mayoral election, becoming Birmingham's first African American mayor.

On April 27, 1981, Black and nine other would-be mercenaries – many recruited from Klan affiliated organizations – were arrested in New Orleans as they prepared to board a boat stocked with weapons and ammunition to invade the island nation Dominica in what they would call Operation Red Dog. Local media labeled the botched attempt the "Bayou of Pigs", a play on words for the unsuccessful 1961 "Bay of Pigs Invasion" of Cuba.

Black later explained the invasion as an attempt to set up an anti-communist regime, saying, "What we were doing was in the best interests of the United States and its security in the hemisphere, and we feel betrayed by our own government." The invasion was intended to restore former prime minister Patrick John to the mostly black Caribbean island. Prosecutors said the real purpose for the invasion would have been to set up tourism, gambling, offshore banking, and timber logging operations on the impoverished island.

In 1981, Black was sentenced to three years in prison for his role in the attempted invasion and his violation of the Neutrality Act. Black, Federal Bureau of Prisons #16692-034 was initially incarcerated at Federal Correctional Institution, Tucson. In 1983, he was transferred to Federal Correctional Institution, Big Spring. He was released on November 15, 1984. During his time in prison, Black took computer programming classes which led him to establish Stormfront on the Internet years later.

He unsuccessfully ran for office in Alabama, this time as a Populist Party U.S. Senate candidate.

== Stormfront ==
In 1995, Black founded Stormfront, which was the Internet's first significant website espousing racial hate. It remains among the most popular online resources for those drawn to racist ideologies. The site has featured the writings of William Luther Pierce and David Duke as well as works by the Holocaust denying Institute for Historical Review and the Culture of Critique series. At first, along with these articles, Stormfront housed a library of white pride, neo-Nazi, and white power skinhead graphics for downloading, and a number of links to other white nationalist websites.

The Stormfront forum acts as one of the largest online gatherings of racism and Holocaust deniers in the world, with threads on this theme gaining hundreds of thousands of views. A number of radio shows published by Black's web site have featured Holocaust denial.

In 1998, Black told the Miami New Times: "We want to take America back. We know a multicultural Yugoslav nation can't hold up for too long. Whites won't have any choice but to take military action. It's our children whose interests we have to defend."

In 1999, Black created the website "martinlutherking.org", which is administered by Stormfront, to malign King's character. In January 2018, the site remained online and surpassed sites containing reliable content in Google Search results.

In December 2007, Black gained attention for donating money to Ron Paul's 2008 presidential run.

In 2008, Black said that the establishment of white pride as a special interest group within the Republican Party is crucial. Asked by an interviewer for Italian newspaper la Repubblica if Stormfront was not just the new Ku Klux Klan, Black responded: "Yes, that's how it is", though he noted that he would never say so to an American journalist.

On May 5, 2009, it was announced that Black was one of 22 on a British Home Office list of individuals banned from entering the United Kingdom for "promoting serious criminal activity and fostering hatred that might lead to inter-community violence".

== Family ==
In 2008, various media outlets reported that Black's wife, Chloe, worked as an executive assistant for sugar baron José Fanjul who runs the Florida Crystals company and owns a real estate business in Latin American countries. In particular, her job duties included acting as the spokesperson for a charter school "to lift underprivileged black and Hispanic children out of poverty." The story resulted in Black being criticized by some other white nationalists.

In August 2008, Black's 19-year-old child Adrianne Black (born Derek Black) was elected to one of 111 seats on the Palm Beach County, Florida, Republican committee, with 167 of 287 votes. The committee however, refused to seat Adrianne, citing a loyalty oath she failed to sign before registering her candidacy. The oath states candidates must refrain from activities "likely to injure the name of the Republican Party." She hosted the Derek Black Show weekdays on a local West Palm Beach, Florida AM radio station, WPBR, to which Don Black paid $600 a week to broadcast content on. The radio show ended in January 2013, with Adrianne appearing on few episodes over the last year.

By summer 2013, Adrianne had called into question racist ideologies, and she began to renounce white supremacism and issued an apology to those harmed by her previous actions and beliefs. Her renunciation reportedly shocked her father and like-minded people. By 2016, Adrianne had fully renounced her white nationalist views and was actively speaking out against such views in the press. Washington Post staff writer Eli Saslow detailed the ideological transformation of Adrianne which began with the rejection of her family, moving to Michigan and assuming a new name and eventually becoming a Ph.D. student at the University of Chicago, studying Medieval Islam.
