= Regnery Publishing =

American conservative book publisher

- Parent company: Skyhorse Publishing
- Founded: 1947
- Founder: Henry Regnery
- Country of origin: United States
- Headquarters location: Washington, D.C., U.S.
- Distribution: Simon & Schuster
- Nonfiction topics: Conservatism
- Imprints: Regnery Gateway, Regnery History, Regnery Kids, ISI Books
- Official website: www.regnery.com

Regnery Publishing is a politically conservative book publisher based in Washington, D.C. The company was founded by Henry Regnery in 1947. In December 2023, Regnery was acquired from Salem Media Group by Skyhorse Publishing, with Skyhorse president Tony Lyons becoming Regnery's publisher.

Regnery has published books by Haley Barbour, Ann Coulter, Ted Cruz, Newt Gingrich, Josh Hawley, David Horowitz, Michelle Malkin, Barbara Olson, Sarah Palin, Mike Pence, Robert Spencer, and others.

== History ==
=== 20th century ===
Regnery Publishing has existed as a series of companies associated with Henry Regnery. The first, Henry Regnery Company, was founded in Chicago in 1947 and split in 1977, forming Regnery Gateway Inc. and Contemporary Books Inc. Under the leadership of Henry Regnery's son, Alfred Regnery, Regnery Gateway became the present-day Regnery Publishing.

After helping to found Human Events as a weekly newsletter, Regnery began publishing monthly pamphlets and books. Some of the first pamphlets he published, including a reprint of a speech by University of Chicago president Robert M. Hutchins, criticized the harsh treatment of Germans and Japanese both in popular attitudes and in postwar administration of the former Axis countries.

Regnery published the pamphlets and some books under the name Human Events Associates in 1946. He began publishing under his own name in September 1947. The first book published by the Henry Regnery Company was by socialist Victor Gollancz, who ran the Left Book Club in Great Britain. A man of Jewish heritage, Gollancz was appalled at the bombing of German civilians late in the war and by the treatment of the country afterward. Gollancz published In Darkest Germany in Britain but was unable to find an American publisher for his ideas. He approached Regnery, who agreed to publish it. Regnery subsequently published the U.S. edition of Our Threatened Values by Gollancz.

Regnery's third book was The Hitler in Our Selves, by Max Picard. Other early books included The German Opposition to Hitler by the German nationalist Hans Rothfels and The High Cost of Vengeance (1949) by Freda Utley which was critical of the Allies' air campaign and post-war occupation. Utley's book was the first Regnery book to be reviewed in The New York Times, where it was excoriated. Reinhold Niebuhr gave it a positive review in The Nation magazine.

The company was founded as a nonprofit corporation. Regnery later wrote that it was initially organized that way, "not because I had any ideological objection to profits, but because, as it seemed to me then, and does still, in matters of excellence the market is a poor judge. The books that are most needed are often precisely those that will have only a modest sale." The Internal Revenue Service forced the company to be reorganized as a for-profit concern on March 1, 1948. Regnery hired his first few employees that year.

Regnery published some of the first and most important books of the postwar American conservative movement. "[I]t was a measure of the grip that liberal-minded editors had on American publishing at the time that Regnery, which was founded in 1947, was one of only two houses known to be sympathetic to conservative authors", according to Henry Regnery's 1996 obituary in The New York Times.

In the early 1950s, Regnery published two books by Robert Welch, who went on to found the John Birch Society in 1958. In May God Forgive Us, Welch criticized influential foreign-policy analysts and policymakers and accused many of working to further Communism as part of a conspiracy. In 1954, Regnery published Welch's biography of John Birch, an American Baptist missionary in China who was killed by Chinese Communists after he became a U.S. intelligence officer in World War II.

In 1951, Regnery published God and Man at Yale, the first book written by William F. Buckley, Jr. At that time, Regnery had a close affiliation with the University of Chicago and published classics for the Great Books series at the University, but he lost the contract as a result of publishing Buckley's book.

In 1953, Regnery published Russell Kirk's work The Conservative Mind, a seminal book for post-World War II American conservatism, as well as books by Albert Jay Nock, James J. Kilpatrick, James Burnham and Whittaker Chambers. He also published paperback editions of literary works by authors such as novelist Wyndham Lewis and the poets T. S. Eliot and Ezra Pound.

In 1954, Regnery published McCarthy and His Enemies by William F. Buckley and L. Brent Bozell Jr. "Although Mr. Buckley [...] had criticized the senator for 'gross exaggerations,' Mr. McCarthy said he would not dispute the merits of the book with the authors", according to a news article in The New York Times. While criticizing McCarthy, the book was sympathetic to him (and in fact was harsher on McCarthy's critics than it was on the senator for making false allegations), and McCarthy attended a reception for the authors.

In 1977, the Henry Regnery Company split, with Henry Regnery moving to Washington, D.C. to form Regnery Gateway Inc. He took with him many of the Henry Regnery Company's rights to political, philosophical, psychological, and religious books along with a few select titles from other genres and the trademark for the Gateway Editions series. The original Henry Regnery Company remained in Chicago and was renamed Contemporary Books. Contemporary was purchased by Tribune Company and merged with Compton's Multimedia Publishing Group to form Tribune Education, which was acquired in 2000 by McGraw-Hill.

In the 1980s, Alfred S. Regnery, son of Henry Regnery, took control of Regnery Gateway.

In 1993, the Regnery family sold the publishing company to Phillips Publishing International, which put the book publishing company into its Eagle Publishing subsidiary, which also published the weekly Human Events. At that time, Regnery Gateway was renamed Regnery Publishing Inc. Alfred Regnery left his post as president of Regnery Publishing in the 2000s to become the publisher of The American Spectator magazine. Alex Novak, son of political columnist Robert Novak, is associate publisher of Regnery's history imprint.

=== 21st century ===
One of Regnery's publishing lines is the Politically Incorrect Guide (P.I.G.) series of books, introduced in 2004 to present conservative views of historical or current events, such as the American Civil War, the British Empire, the Roman Catholic Church, Islam, immigration, and climate change.

In November 2007, Jerome Corsi, Bill Gertz, Robert "Buzz" Patterson, Joel Mowbray, and Richard Miniter, five authors whose works had been published by Regnery, filed a lawsuit over royalties claiming that Regnery had been self-dealing by diverting book sales away from retail outlets and to book clubs and other channels owned by Regnery's then-parent company, Eagle Publishing. On January 30, 2008, a federal judge dismissed all eight counts of the lawsuit because the authors had signed contracts that included a mandatory arbitration clause. Three of the authors (Miniter, Corsi, and Mowbray) later sought arbitration. In December 2011, the American Arbitration Association released its decision, ruling in favor of Regnery on all counts.

In January 2014, Regnery was acquired along with other Eagle Publishing properties by Salem Communications.

On July 18, 2018, Simon & Schuster issued a press release announcing an international distribution agreement with Regnery Publishing to begin July 2018. According to the terms of the agreement, Regnery retained responsibility for sales of its titles in the United States while Simon & Schuster began to handle distribution in the United States and both sales and distribution in Canada and export markets around the world.

In 2020, Regnery Publishing published Irreversible Damage, a book that endorses the controversial concept of rapid-onset gender dysphoria (ROGD), despite the lack of evidence supporting a diagnosis.

After U.S. Senator Josh Hawley lost a publishing contract with Simon & Schuster in the aftermath of the 2021 storming of the U.S. Capitol for his role in objecting to the certification of the Electoral College results in the 2020 presidential election, Regnery Publishing said it would publish Hawley's book.

In early 2023, Regnery acquired ISI Books, the publishing division of the Intercollegiate Studies Institute.

In December 2023, Skyhorse Publishing announced that it was purchasing Regnery, with Skyhorse president Tony Lyons becoming publisher of Regnery. In January 2024, Skyhorse announced the phasing out of Regnery's religious imprint, Salem Books, in favor of Skyhorse's existing Good Books imprint.

=== Reception ===
In November 2001, Nicholas Confessore, then a writer for the American Prospect, wrote the following about Regnery's position in the publishing world:

Welcome to the world of Regnery Publishing—lifestyle press for conservatives, preferred printer of presidential hopefuls, and venerable publisher of books for the culture wars. Call it—gracelessly but more accurately—a medium-sized, loosely linked network of conservative types, with few degrees of separation and similar political aims. Just don't call it a conspiracy.

Some reviewers have criticized the Politically Incorrect Guide books for their accuracy. In March 2005, historian David Greenberg wrote that The Politically Incorrect Guide to American History was "incorrect in more than just its politics" and that "it would be tedious to debunk."

In August 2006, one critic called The Politically Incorrect Guide to Darwinism and Intelligent Design "not only politically incorrect but incorrect in most other ways as well: scientifically, logically, historically, legally, academically, and morally."

In May 2008, Chris Mooney criticized The Politically Incorrect Guide to Science as "The Incorrect Guide to Science." Peter Bacon of Harvard Political Review took issue with The Politically Incorrect Guide to the Civil War for its "cherry-picked research and one-sided judgments of figures."
