= National Policy Institute =

White supremacist think tank and lobbying group

- Abbreviation: NPI
- Formation: 2005; 21 years ago
- Founder: William Regnery II
- Dissolved: 2020
- Type: White nationalism; white supremacism
- Headquarters: Alexandria, Virginia, U.S.
- Leader: Louis R. Andrews, Chairman (2005–2011); Richard B. Spencer, President (2011–)

The National Policy Institute (NPI) was a white supremacist think tank and lobbying group based in Alexandria, Virginia. It lobbied for white supremacists and the alt-right. Its president was Richard B. Spencer.

It has been largely inactive since late 2020, and its website has been inactive or dead since then. (Note: Archive.org has records of the website as of October 27, 2020: "National Policy Institute". Archived from the original on October 27, 2020.; From then until May 2021 entries linked to a blog for the "Geopolitical Studies Institute" which has not been updated since February 2020. Entries after that date no longer load.) In 2022, Spencer confirmed that the organization was defunct.

== Activities ==
Richard B. Spencer, Peter Brimelow, and Jared Taylor at a press conference on November 18, 2016

The NPI was founded in 2005 by William Regnery II. Louis R. Andrews was the chairman until 2010. Andrews said that he had voted for Barack Obama in the 2008 presidential election because "I want to see the Republican Party destroyed, so it can be reborn as a party representing the interests of white people, and not entrenched corporate elites." When Andrews died in 2011, he was replaced by Richard B. Spencer. According to George Hawley, an assistant professor of Political Science at the University of Alabama, NPI was "rather obscure and marginalized" until Spencer became its president in 2011, at which point Spencer's website, AlternativeRight.com, became an NPI initiative.

The group was based in Augusta, Georgia, at its founding, but by 2013 had relocated to Montana. Spencer divides his time between Montana and Virginia; in 2016, the group was based in Arlington, Virginia. By early 2017, the NPI had leased a townhouse office space on King Street in Old Town Alexandria, Virginia, where it maintains its headquarters today. City leaders in Arlington and Alexandria acknowledged the NPI's right to operate, but denounced the group's views. The group's presence in Alexandria has prompted several protests.

In December 2013, NPI launched a website, Radix Journal, which describes itself as "a periodical on culture, race, metapolitics, critical theory, and society". The NPI received a grant from the Pioneer Fund, a racist pseudo-scientific organization.

In 2014, Spencer was deported from Budapest, Hungary. Under terms of the Schengen Agreement, he was banned for three years from 26 countries in Europe after trying to organize the National Policy Institute Conference, a conference for White nationalists.

In 2016, Twitter suspended the accounts of the NPI, its leader Richard B. Spencer and others under its terms of use. Spencer said that "digitally speaking, there has been execution squads across the alt-right" and accused Twitter of "corporate Stalinism". However, Twitter's suspension was not based on the content of Spencer's posts, but rather on Twitter's rule barring multiple accounts with overlapping uses. Spencer's personal Twitter account was reinstated several weeks later; the NPI's remained suspended.

Spencer was the headline speaker at a 2016 NPI conference held in Washington, D.C., and celebrated the election of Donald Trump as "the first step towards identity politics in the United States" and "the victory of will" (a reference to Triumph of the Will, the Nazi propaganda film). Spencer "railed against Jews and, with a smile, quoted Nazi propaganda in the original German". Spencer finished his speech by yelling "Hail Trump! Hail our people! Hail victory!" as audience members responded by standing up and making the Nazi salute. The United States Holocaust Museum issued a statement condemning the "hateful rhetoric" of the conference. Other speakers included Scotland-based YouTuber Millennial Woes.

In July 2017, Evan McLaren became executive director. He resigned in April 2018. As of January 2020, he has not been replaced.

The NPI was banned from YouTube for not following the platform's policies on hate speech in June 2020. Spencer announced he would appeal the ban.

In 2021, a federal judge ordered the NPI to pay $2.4 million to a man injured at the 2017 "Unite the Right" rally in Charlottesville, Virginia.

== Fundraising and status ==
According to the Associated Press, NPI "raised $442,482 in tax-deductible contributions from 2007 through 2012".

NPI's tax-exempt status was revoked in 2017 by the Internal Revenue Service (IRS) for failing to file tax returns. The group had not filed a Form 990 since 2013. In March 2017, the Virginia Department of Agriculture and Consumer Services (VDACS), which regulates the operation of charities in Virginia, removed the NPI's entry from its public database of nonprofits and announced that it was reviewing the group's status. The NPI raised $50,000 in late 2016 and early 2017 from an online fundraising drive and has solicited donations to be sent to its Arlington, Virginia post office box, but in February 2017 VDACS had listed the group as "not authorized to solicit in Virginia." As of August, 2019, mail sent to the address was being returned as "undeliverable".

== Views ==
NPI's website says that "the dispossession of White Americans will have catastrophic effects for the entire world, not just for our people". The organization has produced a series of reports on affirmative action, race and conservatism, the Southern Poverty Law Center, and a report edited and predominantly written by VDARE contributor Nicholas Stix.

The NPI has been described by the Southern Poverty Law Center (SPLC) as a white supremacist organization. Marilyn Mayo, the co-director of the Anti-Defamation League's Center on Extremism, said that the group "basically was founded to be kind of a white supremacist think tank".

The NPI is regarded as part of a group of white nationalist organizations that, according to The New York Times, "try to take a more highbrow approach, couching white nationalist arguments as academic commentary on black inferiority, the immigration threat to whites and other racial issues." Other groups that advance similar strategies include the New Century Foundation (and its publication American Renaissance,) the Charles Martel Society (and its website the Occidental Observer), and the Pioneer Fund, all of which have been described by the SPLC as playing leading roles in the promotion of "academic racism".

== See also ==
- List of white nationalist organizations
