= Human Nature (journal) =

- Language: English
- Edited by: Louis Calistro Alvarado

Publication details
- History: 1990–present
- Publisher: Springer Science+Business Media
- Frequency: Quarterly
- Impact factor: 2.75 (2021)

Standard abbreviations
- ISO 4: Hum. Nat.

Indexing
- CODEN: HNATER
- ISSN: 1045-6767 (print); 1936-4776 (web)
- LCCN: 90640800
- OCLC no.: 66198390

Links
- Journal homepage; Online archive

Human Nature: An Interdisciplinary Biosocial Perspective is a quarterly peer-reviewed scientific journal. It covers research on human behavior from "an interdisciplinary biosocial perspective". It was established by Jane B. Lancaster in 1990 and is published by Springer Science+Business Media. The current editor-in-chief is Louis Calistro Alvarado (Binghamton University). As of 2021, the journal has a 2-year impact factor of 2.75 and a 5-year impact factor of 3.684.
