= Zev Garber =

American academic (born 1941)

- Born: March 1, 1941 (age 85); Bronx, NY
- Education: Bar-Ilan University; Hunter College; University of Southern California
- Occupation: Academic
- Employer: Los Angeles Valley College
- Known for: Professor Emeritus and Chair of Jewish Studies at Los Angeles Valley College & editor of Shofar
- Spouse: Susan
- Children: Asher and Dorit

Zev Garber (March 1, 1941) is an American academic. He is Professor Emeritus and Chair of Jewish Studies at Los Angeles Valley College, and the editor of Shofar, a peer-reviewed academic journal of Jewish Studies. He is the former president of the National Association of Professors of Hebrew. He was the subject of a Festschrift in 2009.

== Early life and education ==
Garber was born into a Jewish family and attended Bar-Ilan University in Israel, and he graduated with a bachelor of arts degree in Hebrew from Hunter College. He studied Hebrew, Aramaic, Syriac, Ugaritic at UCLA graduate school. He earned a master of arts degree and completed his course work for PhD in Religion at the University of Southern California.

== Career ==
Garber started his career as a Hebrew teacher at the Los Angeles Hebrew High School.

Garber joined the faculty at Los Angeles Valley College in 1970. Within a year, he established a Jewish Studies major. As of 2016, he is Professor Emeritus and Chair of Jewish Studies. He was the Visiting Rosenthal Professor of Judaic Studies at Case Western Reserve University in 2005. He taught Jewish studies at the University of California at Riverside and at the American Jewish University. Garber has been the co-editor and later editor of Shofar since 1994. He served as the President of the National Association of Professors of Hebrew, where he still serves as an officer. He has been the editor of Iggeret, the newsletter of the NAPH, since 1984.

Garber established the first Jewish Studies program in a public school of higher learning in the State of California at Los Angeles Valley College (1971). He is recognized as a pioneer of Jewish Studies at two-year public colleges. His scholarship embraces Jewish Studies pedagogy, Shoah theology, Jewish Jesus, and interfaith dialogue. His (and Bruce Zuckerman) advocacy of Shoah not Holocaust as the term of record for the murder of European Jewry during WW II, presented at the Oxford Conference ("Remembering for the Future," 10–13 July 1988) was among the first to advocate careful terminology to describe the Jewish genocide.

Garber, published author and presenter of hundreds of academic articles and reviews, was the subject of a Festschrift edited by Steven L. Jacobs entitled Maven in Blue Jeans: A Festschrift in Honor of Zev Garber in 2009.

== Publications ==
- Garber, Zev (1986). Methodology in the Academic Teaching of Judaism. Lanham, Maryland: University Press of America. ISBN 9780819157249. OCLC 14272763.
- Berger, Alan L.; Garber, Zev; Libowitz, Richard (1988). Methodology in the Academic Teaching of the Holocaust. Lanham, Maryland: University Press of America. ISBN 9780819169617. OCLC 17649643.
- Garber, Zev (1991). Teaching Hebrew Language and Literature at the College Level.
- Garber, Zev (1994). Shoah: The Paradigmatic Genocide: Essays in Exegesis and Eisegesis. Lanham, Maryland: University Press of America. ISBN 9780819196583. OCLC 30734284.
- Berenbaum, Michael; Rubenstein, Betty Rogers, eds. (1995). What Kind of God? Essays in Honor of Richard L. Rubenstein. Consulting editors: Rubenstein Feibel, Hannah; Garber, Susan; Garber, Zev. Lanham, Maryland: University Press of America. ISBN 9780761800361. OCLC 32780110.
- Cargas, Harry J.; Garber, Zev; Libowitz, Richard (1998). Peace, In Deed: Essays in Honor of Harry James Cargas. Atlanta, Georgia: Scholars Press. ISBN 9780788504976. OCLC 39763342.
- Garber, Zev (2000). Academic Approaches to Teaching Jewish Studies. Lanham, Maryland: University Press of America. ISBN 9780761815525. OCLC 42475906.
- Jacobs, Steven; Knight, Henry; Garber, Zev (2004). Moore, James (ed.). Post-Shoah Dialogues: Re-Thinking our Texts Together. Lanham, Maryland: University Press of America. ISBN 9780761828372. OCLC 55142963.
- Garber, Zev; Zuckerman, Bruce (2004). Double Takes: Thinking and Rethinking Issues of Modern Judaism in Ancient Contexts. Lanham, Maryland: University Press of America. ISBN 9780761828945. OCLC 56680883.
- Garber, Zev, ed. (2006). Mel Gibson's Passion: The Film, the Controversy, and Its Implications. West Lafayette, Indiana: Purdue University Press. ISBN 9781557534057. OCLC 61821761.
- Ansell, Lisa; Garber, Zev; Schoenberg, Jeremy; Zuckerman, Bruce (2008). The Impact of the Holocaust in America. West Lafayette, Indiana: Purdue University Press. ISBN 9781557535344. OCLC 286532454.
- Garber, Zev (2011). The Jewish Jesus: Revelation, Reflection, Reclamation. West Lafayette, Indiana: Purdue University Press. ISBN 9781557535795. OCLC 670480801.
- Garber, Zev (2015). Teaching the Historical Jesus: Issues and Exegesis. New York: Routledge. ISBN 9781138794610. OCLC 886382164.
- Garber, Zev, Hakak, Lev, Katz, Shmuel, eds., (2017). The Maskil in Our Time:Studies in Honor of Moshe Pelli.Israel: Hakibutz Hameuchad Publishing House. ISBN 978-965-020-837-0. Hebrew and English.
- Garber, Zev and Hanson, Kenneth, Judaism and Jesus (2020), Cambridge Scholars Publishing, Newcastle upon Tyne, UK ISBN 978-1-5275-4129-0
- Garber, Zev and Hanson, Kenneth, "The Annotated Passover Haggadah" (2021), GCRR Press, Denver, CO (ISBN 978-1-7362739-2-0)
- Garber, Zev and Hanson, Kenneth,"Teaching the Shoah:Mandate and Momentum" (2023), Cambridge Scholars Publishing, Newcastle upon Tyre, UK (ISBN 1-5275-9120-4)
- Garber, Zev and Hanson, Kenneth,"Jewish Studies and the Gospel of St John," (2025), Cambridge Scholars Publishing, Newcastle upon Tyre, UK (ISBN 978-1-0364-4148-7)
