= American Renaissance (magazine) =

American white supremacist magazine

- Available in: English
- Headquarters: United States
- Country of origin: United States
- Owner: New Century Foundation
- Creator: Jared Taylor
- Founder: Jared Taylor
- Editor: Jared Taylor
- Services: Online magazine, conferences
- Website: amren.com
- Launched: November 1990; 36 years ago

American Renaissance (AR or AmRen) is a white supremacist website and former monthly magazine publication founded and edited by Jared Taylor. It is published by the New Century Foundation.

Since the magazine's first issue in 1990, it has become linked to various white supremacist people and organizations. It hosted conferences attended by neo-Nazis and white nationalists. Starting in 2017, the magazine and Taylor's accounts were suspended by multiple social media platforms. The Southern Poverty Law Center listed American Renaissance as a "white nationalist hate group".

== History ==
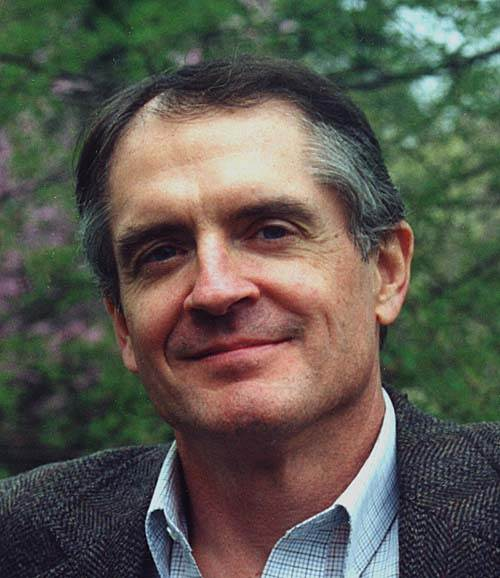
Founder Jared Taylor

The magazine and the New Century Foundation were established by Jared Taylor; the first issue of American Renaissance was published in November 1990.

Both the magazine and foundation, as well as Taylor have had links with organizations such as the Council of Conservative Citizens, the Pioneer Fund, and the British National Party. Former Grand Wizards of the Ku Klux Klan Don Black and David Duke have attended American Renaissance conferences and have been seen talking with Taylor. Proud Boys founder Gavin McInnes has also written for American Renaissance. The organization has held bi-annual conferences that attract neo-Nazis, white nationalists, white separatists, Holocaust deniers, and eugenicists. Attendance at the conferences has varied; in February 2008, some 300 people attended.

== Content ==
American Renaissance is a white supremacist publication. It has been described as "alt-right" by The Guardian. On December 18, 2017, the accounts for the magazine and its editor Jared Taylor were suspended by Twitter. Before the suspension, the magazine's account had 32,800 followers.

The publication promotes pseudoscientific notions "that attempt to demonstrate the intellectual and cultural superiority of whites and publishes articles on the supposed decline of American society because of integrationist social policies."

According to Carol M. Swain, "American Renaissance has become the leading intellectual journal of contemporary white nationalism with a small but highly educated readership which sees itself as the vanguard of a new race realism that seeks to rescue America from the harmful effects of multiculturalist dogmas." YouTube banned the American Renaissance channel, along with those of individual white nationalists, in late June 2020 for violating the website's policies against hate speech.

== Conferences ==
American Renaissance has held conferences since 1994. Anti-racist activists were sometimes successful in persuading private hotels to cancel their reservations with American Renaissance. In 2011, the publication planned to hold a three-day conference at a Sheraton Airport hotel in Charlotte, North Carolina. The hotel canceled the group's booking amid plans by anti-racism activists and the Jewish Defense Organization (JDO) to protest at the conference site. The mayor pro tem of the city also reportedly contacted the hotel.

Since 2012, the American Renaissance has held its conference at Montgomery Bell State Park Inn in Burns, Tennessee, a state-owned site. Protests have often taken place outside the conference facilities.

In 2017, Helmuth Nyborg spoke at an American Renaissance conference.

== Reception ==
=== Southern Poverty Law Center ===
American Renaissance and the New Century Foundation appear on a list of 115 "white nationalist hate groups" published in the Intelligence Report of the Southern Poverty Law Center (SPLC).

Mark Potok, editor-in-chief of the Intelligence Report, has said: "Jared Taylor is the cultivated, cosmopolitan face of white supremacy. He is the guy who is providing the intellectual heft, in effect, to modern-day Klansmen." Taylor stated in a radio interview: "I've never been a member of the Klan. I've never known a person who is a member of the Klan." An article in the Pittsburgh Post-Gazette reported that Taylor had at least met former Klansman David Duke at an American Renaissance conference, and sat with Don Black, a former Grand Wizard of the Klan, at Taylor's kitchen table.

An article in the Intelligence Report by Potok and Heidi Beirich, head of the SPLC's Intelligence Project stated: "American Renaissance has become increasingly important over the years, bringing a measure of intellectualism and seriousness to the typically thug-dominated world of white supremacy. Today, it may be the closest thing the extreme right has to a real think tank. Whether or not it survives, and in what form, genuinely matters."

=== Anti-Defamation League ===
The American non-governmental organization Anti-Defamation League (ADL) describes American Renaissance as a "white supremacist journal". The ADL also writes: "Taylor eschews anti-Semitism. Seeing Jews as white, greatly influential and the 'conscience of society', Taylor rather seeks to partner with Jews who share his views on race and racial diversity" and "Jews have been speakers or participants at all eight American Renaissance conferences" although controversy followed accusations by David Duke, who was not a scheduled presenter, at the 2006 conference.

=== Alleged DHS memo regarding 2011 Tucson shooting ===
A document—initially claimed to be a leaked Department of Homeland Security (DHS) memo—alleged that Jared Lee Loughner, the accused gunman in the 2011 Tucson shooting that wounded Congresswoman Gabby Giffords and killed six bystanders, may have had ties to American Renaissance, which it called an "anti-ZOG (Zionist Occupational [sic] Government) and anti-semitic" group. In an interview with Fox News, Jared Taylor denied the organization ever used the term "ZOG" and said Loughner had no connection to them.

DHS officials the following day reported: "the department has not established any such possibility, undercutting what appears to be the primary basis for this claim". Furthermore, no such memo had been issued.

Major David Denlinger, commander of the Arizona Counter Terrorism Information Center acknowledged that the document came from his agency, but contained errors. He said that he has no reason to believe that Loughner had any direct connection with or was being directed by American Renaissance.
