= Neoconservatism and paleoconservatism =

History of conflicts and ideological comparison

Neoconservatism and paleoconservatism are two major branches of the American conservative political movement. Representatives of each faction often argue that the other does not represent true conservatism. Disputed issues include immigration, trade, the United States Constitution, taxation, budget, business, the Federal Reserve, drug policy, foreign aid and the foreign policy of the United States.

== Conflict of values ==
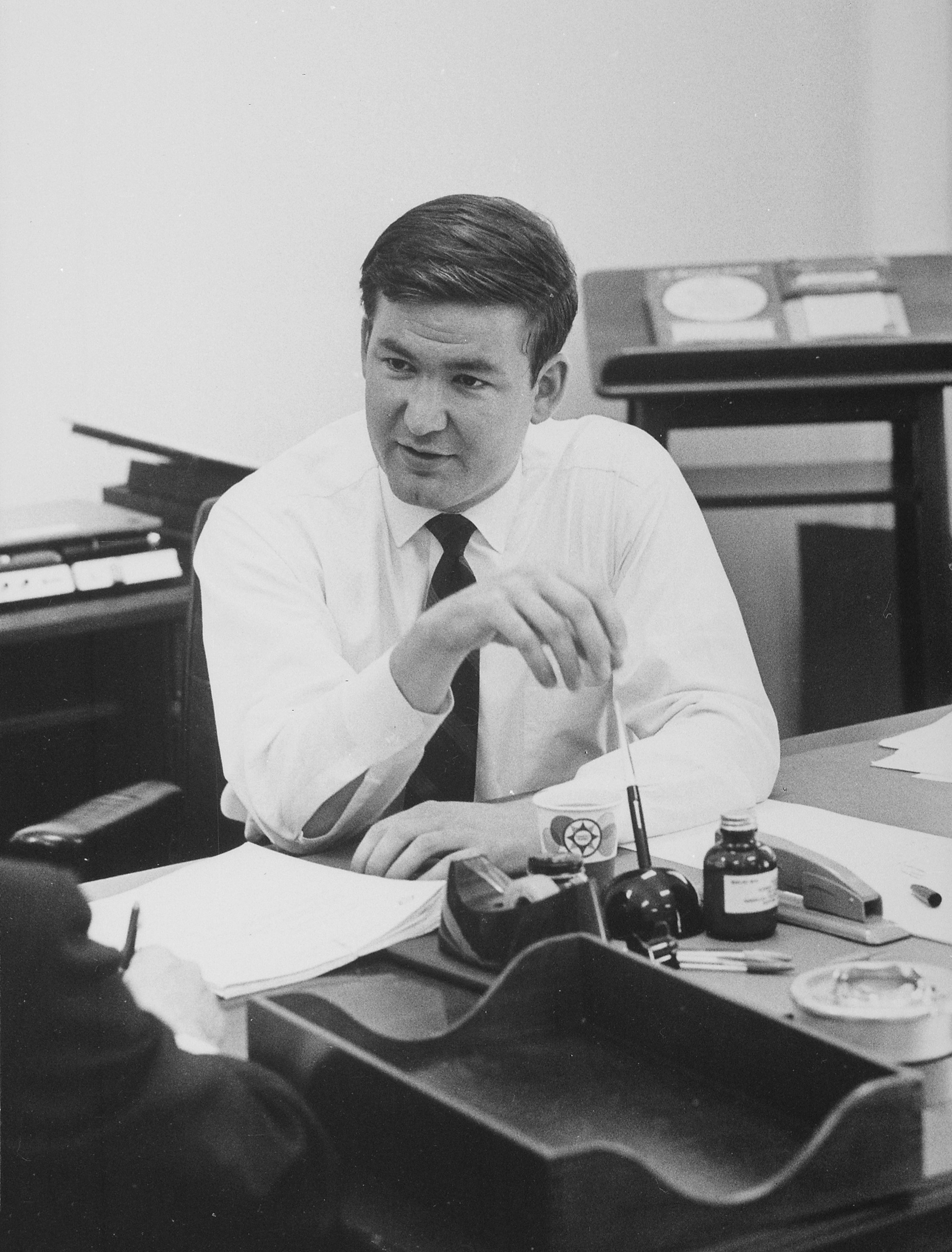
Pat Buchanan, a prominent figure in paleoconservatism

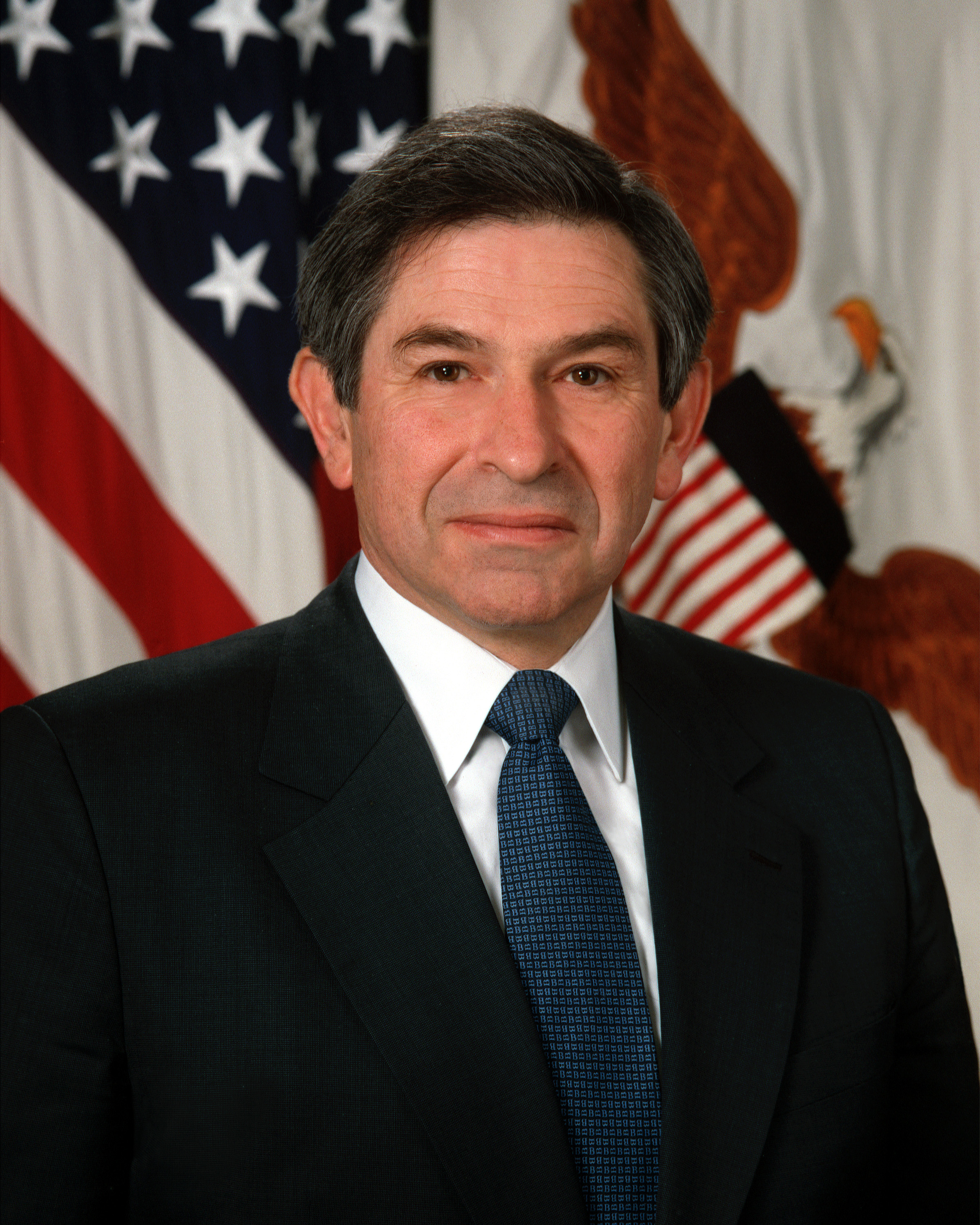
Former U.S. Deputy Secretary of Defense Paul Wolfowitz, an influential neoconservative of the 21st century

The word paleoconservative was originally a tongue-in-cheek rejoinder used in the 1980s to differentiate traditional conservatives from neoconservatives and Straussians. Pat Buchanan said the conservative movement had been captured by "a globalist, interventionist, open borders ideology" in an edition of Buchanan and Press in 2002. He was co-founding The American Conservative magazine as a challenge to what he saw as dominant neoconservatives, and for Buchanan, a corrupter of real conservative values.

The roots of this conflict predate both the paleoconservatives or the neoconservatives, which both came to prominence in the 1970s and 1980s. In 1950, essayist Lionel Trilling said that liberalism is the "sole intellectual tradition" in the United States. He dismissed Old Right conservatives as expressing "irritable mental gestures which seek to resemble ideas". Three years later, Russell Kirk's erudite work The Conservative Mind challenged this thesis by arguing that American Conservatism had a long and distinguished pedigree in the history of ideas.

The neoconservative movement, as it rose in the 1970s, articulated a different vision from the Old Right. While neoconservatives were not opposed to the New Deal as were the Old Right, they thought the subsequent developments in the Great Society and the New Left went too far. Neoconservatives embraced an interventionist foreign policy, particularly in the Middle East. They espoused especially strong support for Israel and believe the United States should help ensure the security of the Jewish state.

In a feature article called "The Democracy Boosters" in the March 24, 1989 issue of National Review, Claes G. Ryn warned of the uncritical advocacy of democracy and abstract universalist principles among so-called Conservatives, including Michael Novak, Allan Bloom, Ben Wattenberg, and Richard John Neuhaus. These sentiments, Ryn argued, were more akin to leftism than to Conservatism. In the ensuing controversy Ryn was attacked at length in National Review by the democratic socialist Sidney Hook, as well as by others aligning themselves with the exceptional notion that America is called by history to advance its principles in the world. In 1991 Ryn argued in a book, The New Jacobinism, that neoconservatism bears a close resemblance to the ideas behind the French Revolution. The French Jacobins of the late 1700s appointed France the agent of universal principles; the new Jacobins of the late 1900s had similarly selected the United States for the task of transforming the world. Ryn thus warned of the dangers of ideological imperialism.

Paleo historian Thomas Woods elaborated on the divergence in the Conservative movement, and the ascent of the neoconservatives, and their distinguishing features from more traditional Conservatives:

The Conservative's traditional sympathy for the American South and its people and heritage, evident in the works of such great American Conservatives as Richard M. Weaver and Russell Kirk, began to disappear ... [T]he neocons are heavily influenced by Woodrow Wilson, with perhaps a hint of Theodore Roosevelt. ... They believe in an aggressive U.S. presence practically everywhere, and in the spread of democracy around the world, by force if necessary. ... Neoconservatives tend to want more efficient government agencies; Paleoconservatives want fewer government agencies. [Neoconservatives] generally admire President Franklin Delano Roosevelt and his heavily interventionist New Deal policies. Neoconservatives have not exactly been known for their budget consciousness, and you won't hear them talking about making any serious inroads into the federal apparatus.

In discussing neoconservatives' distinctive positions on state power, Irving Kristol wrote in 2003:

Neocons do not like the concentration of services in the welfare state and are happy to study alternative ways of delivering these services. But they are impatient with the Hayekian notion that we are on "the road to serfdom." Neocons do not feel that kind of alarm or anxiety about the growth of the state in the past century, seeing it as natural, indeed inevitable ... People have always preferred strong government to weak government, although they certainly have no liking for anything that smacks of overly intrusive government. Neocons feel at home in today's America to a degree that more traditional Conservatives do not. Though they find much to be critical about, they tend to seek intellectual guidance in the democratic wisdom of de Tocqueville, rather than in the Tory nostalgia of, say, Russell Kirk.

What made the neoconservative movement so potent was the number of influential intellectuals who attained positions of power in the government and media. Paul Gottfried argued that the neoconservatives funded their efforts using funding originally intended to fight the New Deal or the Great Society. Kristol remarked that "one can say that the historical task and political purpose of neoconservatism would seem to be this: to convert the Republican party, and American Conservatism in general, against their respective wills, into a new kind of Conservative politics suitable to governing a modern democracy."

By comparison, the Paleocons were marginalized. Samuel Francis wrote,

Contemporary Paleoconservatism developed as a reaction against three trends in the American Right during the Reagan administration. First, it reacted against the bid for dominance by the Neoconservatives, former Liberals who insisted not only that their version of Conservative ideology and rhetoric prevail over those of older Conservatives, but also that their team should get the rewards of office and patronage and that the other team of the older Right receive virtually nothing.

Francis also argued that many on the Left misunderstood both the neoconservatives and paleoconservatives, as well as the conflict between the two. He said they disregarded the Paleocons' critiques and over-emphasized the influence of Leo Strauss on the neoconservatives:

This silence about the Paleocons was the result, in part, of the abysmal ignorance of the writers of most such articles but also of the hidden purpose that lurked beneath much of what they wrote. That purpose was not so much to "deconstruct" and "expose" the neoconservatives as to define them as the real Conservative opposition, the legitimate (though deplorable and vicious) "right" against which the polemics and political struggle of the left should be directed. The reason the left prefers the neoconervative "right" to a paleo alternative is, quite simply, that the neocons are essentially of the left themselves and, thus, provide a fake opposition against which the rest of the left can shadowbox and thereby perpetuate its own political and cultural hegemony unchallenged by any authentic right.

Further, Francis also complained that the Neocons never fought the left with anything more than elegant reprimand. If they saw serious criticism in return, they issued charges of antisemitism. He also said that if "the point is to wipe out Israel's enemies," such as in the Iraq invasion, "the [neocon] Likudniks don't care about American casualties very much."

Claes Ryn places neoconservatism in a larger historical and philosophical context. In America the Virtuous (2003) he argues that America's traditional civilization, specifically, its constitutionalism and liberty are rapidly eroding and that neoconservatives exemplify and aggravate this development. Their abstract moral principles, summarized as "virtue," constitute a break with older Western values. Though speaking in the name of America and patriotism and even Conservatism, the neoconservatives are replacing attachment to America's older religious, moral, intellectual and cultural traditions with a form of universalism that has roots in leftist thinking. Additionally, Ryn argues that what he terms "Neo-Jacobin imperialism" threatens to produce interminable wars and poses a serious threat to American constitutionalism.

== Politics and Jewish identity ==
Historian Edward S. Shapiro, tracing the debate back to the 1960s, wrote that many neoconservatives saw their new political philosophy within a specifically Jewish context. This became an element in the dispute with the Paleocons. He said that at first these Jewish neocons equated Conservatism with country club exclusion, racism, and the "Protestant hinterlands," and so shied away from applying the label to themselves. They also considered the Burkean social order as a "premodern social order revered by Edmund Burke and the other pioneers of Conservative thought, a world which had ostracized Jews to the fringes of society." He continued:

"For the Jewish Neoconservatives, children and grandchildren of immigrants from Eastern Europe, this was far too narrow a view of American culture. They emphasized the pluralism and openness of America and claimed that Americanism was less a matter of biological descent and European culture than of civic values and political ideology. Just as the neoconservatives stressed the ideological content of American diplomacy and asserted that American political ideology had well-nigh universal applicability, so they underscored the plastic character of American identity. Anyone was potentially a good American just as long as he or she affirmed the fundamental American political precepts of the Declaration of Independence, the Bill of Rights, and the Gettysburg Address. The Neoconservatives, the traditionalists responded, exaggerated the appeal of American political principles to the rest of the world, and they underestimated the powerful hold which culture has, or should have, on its citizens.

== Conservative rift ==
=== 1981: National Endowment for the Humanities ===
The beginning rift is often traced back to a dispute over the directorship of the National Endowment for the Humanities by the incoming Republican administration in 1981. Senator John East proposed literary scholar Mel Bradford, a former Dixiecrat. Bradford withdrew himself from consideration after neoconservatives argued that his record of academic articles criticizing the actions and thought of Abraham Lincoln ill-suited a Republican nominee. They circulated quotes of Bradford calling Lincoln "a dangerous man," and saying, "The image of Lincoln rose to be very dark" and "indeed almost sinister."

Historian Paul Young described Bradford's view of Lincoln as follows:

Bradford cast all of Lincoln's life in the most sinister of terms. He gave Lincoln no credit for any intellectual or moral progression from his pronouncements in the 1840s to the years of the Civil War. Rather, Bradford freely juxtaposed the young Lincoln's comments on race and slavery, whether on the political hustings or otherwise, with his later statements and actions in order to convict him of hypocrisy. Neither did Bradford afford any consideration to the expediencies of politics; no sin by Lincoln could ever be justified by an appeal to political necessity. Bradford's Lincoln was a paragon of venality: hypocritical, corrupt, racist, unscrupulous, and duplicitous in his rhetoric. He was motivated by his own ambitions and thirst for power, provoking sectional conflict in order to attain his goals. Lincoln was guilty of war crimes for denying medicine to the South, complicit in the under rationing of his own troops, given to locking up political opponents in a "Northern 'Gulag,'" and, in general, an apt model for the twentieth-century dictator. Noting the dyspeptic Edmund Wilson's comparison of Lincoln to Bismarck and Lenin in Patriotic Gore (1962), Bradford added Hitler for good measure.

The neoconservative choice, William Bennett, was nominated on November 13, 1981. Curiously, a few leaders, whom the Paleocons would later oppose, supported Bradford: Dan Quayle, William F. Buckley Jr., and Harry Jaffa. Former Bradford associate Thomas Landess wrote in 2003 that today's Neocons "are too busy running the world to tilt with Mel Bradford."

=== 1983: John Birch Society ===
Democratic congressman from Georgia Larry McDonald was elected second president of the John Birch Society upon the retirement of first president, Robert Welch. Shortly after, McDonald was reported killed when the passenger plane he had boarded to take him to the 30th year commemoration of the U.S.-S. Korea Mutual Defense Treaty, Korean Air Lines Flight 007, was shot down near Moneron Island by the Soviets. Three months earlier, McDonald had appeared as the guest of Pat Buchanan's Crossfire T.V. show, on which Buchanan and journalist Tom Braden discussed with him the John Birch Society's position with regard to the Council on Foreign Relations, Trilateral Commission, and conspiracy. In the introduction he wrote for The Rockefeller File, McDonald had this to say about the book’s eponymous family:

The drive of the Rockefellers and their allies is to create a one-world government, combining super-capitalism and Communism under the same tent, all under their control ... Do I mean conspiracy? Yes I do. I am convinced there is such a plot, international in scope, generations old in planning, and incredibly evil in intent.

=== 1986: Intercollegiate Review and Philadelphia Society ===
The real genesis of the Paleocons came in 1986 when the Paleoconservative Intercollegiate Studies Institute's journal Intercollegiate Review ran a "State of Conservatism" symposium. Some of the contributors complained about growing neoconservative dominance. Historian Clyde Wilson wrote of being "crowded out by overwhelming numbers." Gregory Wolfe argued that true Conservative scholars valued "order and organic community, class and natural aristocracy" and considered "Christian belief as the foundation of morality and law."

Soon after, the Philadelphia Society, a conservative group, held a symposium on neoconservatism at its 1986 annual meeting. Among the critics was historian Stephen Tonsor (who does not accept the paleo label), who said:

It has always struck me as odd, even perverse, that former Marxists have been permitted, yes invited, to play such a leading role in the Conservative movement of the twentieth century. It is splendid when the town whore gets religion and joins the church. Now and then she makes a good choir director, but when she begins to tell the minister what he ought to say in his Sunday sermons, matters have been carried too far.

Tonsor also argued that the movement divided "techniques from ends in an effort to maintain their cultural modernism while rejecting its social and political implications." He said it couldn't be done.

Neoconservatives are, as Irving Kristol remarked, "liberals who have been mugged by reality," but while they have been detached from their social and political myths they have not located themselves in a body of principle that makes life worth living, or that one would die defending.

=== 1987: Catholic University of America ===
Paul Gottfried says that neoconservative lobbying kept him from a professorship in classical political theory at Catholic University of America. David Frum claims this allegation is "relentlessly solipsistic."

=== 1988: The Heritage Foundation ===
Russell Kirk found himself in the minority on December 15, 1988, when he gave a lecture at The Heritage Foundation. The title was "The Neoconservatives: An Endangered Species."^{[unfit]} As Chronicles editor Scott Richert described it,

[One line] helped define the emerging struggle between Neoconservatives and Paleoconservatives. "Not seldom has it seemed," Kirk declared, "as if some eminent Neoconservatives mistook Tel Aviv for the capital of the United States." A few years later, in another Heritage Foundation speech, Kirk repeated that line verbatim. In the wake of the Gulf War, which he had opposed, he clearly understood that those words carried even greater meaning.

Neoconservative commentator Norman Podhoretz, called Kirk's line "a bloody outrage, a piece of anti-Semitism by Kirk that impugns the loyalty of Neoconservatives." His wife, Midge Decter, claimed that Kirk "said people like my husband and me put the interest of Israel before the interest of the United States, that we have a dual loyalty." She had previously denounced Joseph Sobran and the Intercollegiate Review symposium as anti-Semitic as well. She told The New Republic, "It's this notion of a Christian civilization. You have to be part of it or you're not really fit to conserve anything. That's an old line and it's very ignorant."

Conversely, paleoconervative Sam Francis called Kirk's "Tel Aviv" remark "a wisecrack about the slavishly pro-Israel sympathies among Neoconservatives." He called Decter's response untrue, "reckless" and "vitriolic."

=== 1989: Rockford Institute ===
Another defining incident came on May 5, 1989, when the Rockford Institute fired Richard John Neuhaus, who went on to launch the religious journal First Things. One issue between them was that Neuhaus claimed that Chronicles, Rockford's magazine, tilted toward nativism and was "insensitive to the classic language of anti-Semitism." Allan Carlson, then Rockford's president, called the allegations "egregious and potentially damaging." Fourteen years later, Neuhaus called Chronicles "racist and anti-Semitic," joked about "Schadenfreude" and said he holds a "gala staff luncheon" every year to commemorate his termination.

John Judis, a left-wing author and journalist, described the incident:

Under the Rockford Institute's name and funding, Neuhaus published a regular newsletter out of his Center for Religion and Society in New York. But in March 1989, Neuhaus and Podhoretz took strong exception to two articles published in Rockford's glossy journal, Chronicles. In one of them, Chronicles editor Thomas Fleming called for stricter quotas to prevent the United States from "being dominated by Third World immigrants," and in the other, novelist Bill Kauffman defended Gore Vidal, who had earlier attacked Podhoretz for putting Israel's interests before America's. In a letter, Podhoretz wrote Neuhaus, "I know an enemy when I see one, and Chronicles has become just that so far as I am concerned." In May the Rockford Institute made the next move by locking Neuhaus out of the center and confiscating his files. When Neuhaus left, three foundations linked to the Neoconservatives, Olin, Smith Richardson, and Bradley, withdrew their funding for the Rockford Institute, costing an estimated $700,000 a year.

=== 1990: The McLaughlin Group ===
Pat Buchanan's Paleoconservative views soon became a point of dispute. The major controversy began with the August 26, 1990 The McLaughlin Group television broadcast. He said that "there are only two groups that are beating the drums for war in the Middle East—the Israeli defense ministry and its 'amen corner' in the United States"—and was accused of antisemitism.

=== 1993: National Review ===
A further event was the demotion and eventual firing in 1993 of Joseph Sobran from National Review, who criticized American supporters of Israel. One such comment was that the New York Times "really ought to change its name to Holocaust Update." Neoconservative Norman Podhoretz vehemently objected to such writing, saying they were "anti-Semitic in themselves," His wife, Midge Decter, told Sobran she felt "shock and disgust—and contempt—at the discovery that you are little more than a crude and naked anti-Semite."

Sobran himself claimed that founder William F. Buckley told him to "stop antagonizing the Zionist crowd," and Buckley accused him of libel and moral incapacitation. Buckley had previously said that an outsider "might reasonably conclude that those [Israel] columns were written by a writer inclined to anti-Semitism." Before his firing, Sobran discussed the issue in National Review, saying:

I'm responding to an obsession—a more or less official national obsession with a tiny, faraway socialist ethnocracy, which, I agree, ought to be a very minor concern of American policy-makers, but isn't. The orthodox view that Israel is a "reliable ally" is so brittle that a single maverick can ignite a frenzy. The reason, I repeat, is not that critics of Israel are so numerous, but that even one, as far as Israel's claque is concerned, is one too many. There is the terrible danger that the public may be more interested in what he has to say than in the party line the rest of the chorus is emitting.

=== 1997: New York Post ===
Paleoconservative Scott McConnell was fired as the New York Post's editorial page editor on September 4, 1997 after writing editorials critical of Haitian immigration and Puerto Rican statehood. About the latter, he had cited statistics that "half the island's 3.7 million inhabitants receive Food Stamps" and "59.4 percent of Puerto Rican children born on the U.S. mainland are born to unwed mothers." He concluded:

We believe that the looming vote on Puerto Rico's status is yet another sign of how the congressional GOP has lost its way. The current leadership seems more interested in trying to placate the liberal Washington establishment—or hatching schemes it imagines are popular with minority voters—than in protecting the interests of the voters who elected it. This is a feckless way to guide America's destiny.

McConnell later remarked that "our society had developed an expected script of white Anglo contrition and apology ... and that I had failed to follow it." He found himself replaced by John Podhoretz.

Two years after the incident, McConnell said he had changed his mind about Pat Buchanan and joined his campaign as an adviser. He once dismissed his presidential hopes as "not worth discussing." Soon he helped found The American Conservative.

== A protracted conflict ==
=== The ongoing conflict ===
Since the end of the Cold War, the rift within the conservative movement has deepened with the neoconservatives' ascent and the paleoconservatives' marginalization. For example, there were no prominent paleoconservatives in the Bush administration. Charles Krauthammer called Paleoconservatism a "philosophical corpse" and "a mix of nativism, protectionism and isolationism." However, the Trump administration saw a resurgence in paleoconservatism, with Steve Bannon serving as White House Chief Strategist until his dismissal in August 2017, and Stephen Miller continuing to hold a prominent advisory post.

On domestic affairs, The Weekly Standard claimed that "the paleos' radical dissatisfaction with contemporary America could eventually veer into an anti-Americanism almost indistinguishable from the more familiar variety on the left." David Brooks, in the same magazine, claimed that the movement combines "high principle and bad-boy bravado," along with melding good ("longing for the old virtues") with bad ("race and sex roles"). He concluded that paleocons replace "the universalist ideas of the Founding" with "blood and soil." Brooks also described Pat Buchanan's campaign supporters as "people who thrived in the machine age" but who "are not going to thrive in the new economy."

Lew Rockwell once illustrated the depth of paleo/neo schism with the story of an encounter between a Paleocon and a Neocon. The Neocon complained that the Paleocon made an "insensitive remark" about AIDS and said, "How can you say that, when we all have so many close friends who have been struck down by this terrible disease?" The Paleo replied, "'Close friends?' I don't know anyone who has AIDS. I don't know anyone who knows anyone who has AIDS." After that, the Neocon stopped speaking to the Paleocon.

=== March 2003: The Crossfire ===
David Frum of National Review and Pat Buchanan of The American Conservative exchanged harsh words just before the Iraq War began. Buchanan wrote that Neocons influence the U.S. government toward the pursuit of global empire and the benefit of pro-Israel hawks. Frum charged that Paleocons have become unpatriotic, racist, and antisemitic. He also hinted that Paleocons were subversives, claiming they "made common cause with" international Islamists and "deny and excuse terror." A year later, however, National Review founder William F. Buckley Jr. described The American Conservative as "highly literate" and "wonderfully well edited.")

In his article, Buchanan wrote:

This is a time for truth. For America is about to make a momentous decision: whether to launch a series of wars in the Middle East that could ignite the Clash of Civilizations against which Harvard professor Samuel Huntington has warned, a war we believe would be a tragedy and a disaster for this Republic. To avert this war, to answer the Neocon smears, we ask that our readers review their agenda as stated in their words. Sunlight is the best disinfectant. As Al Smith used to say, "Nothing un-American can live in the sunlight."

Frum wrote that:

Having quickly decided that the war on terror was a Jewish war, the Paleos equally swiftly concluded that they wanted no part of it. It's odd: 9/11 actually vindicated some of the things that the Paleos had been arguing, particularly about immigration and national cohesion. But the Paleos were in no mood to press their case. Instead, they plunged into apologetics for the enemy and wishful defeatism.

=== Beyond Paleo and Neocons ===
In 2003, paleoconservative Clyde Wilson speculated that their critique of this "nasty little cabal" might be "belated and repetitive—a diversion from more fundamental problems," namely "a fatal defect of national character." He wrote that the Neocons are courtiers who saw "the chance presented by the vast gaping vacuum of ideas and principles that is the Republican Party." He concluded that Middle America is too willing to "clamber aboard" a GOP bandwagon "and hosanna their way down the road to perdition," instead of creating a populist replacement that might preserve "some semblance of civilized order and liberty."

In addition, while paleoconservative and neoconservative quarrels over Middle East policy, Paul Gottfried argued that domestic equality and the exportability of democracy are greater points of contention between them. He wrote that the neocons' call for "permanent revolution" exists independently of their beliefs about Israel, characterizing the Neos as "ranters out of a Dostoyevskian novel, who are out to practice permanent revolution courtesy of the U.S. government". Also, Paleos, while not wanting the US tied to Israel too strongly, freely disagree with one another about certain Israeli leaders. Pat Buchanan supported Yitzhak Rabin, while Gottfried, who criticizes "truculent [neoconservative] Zionism," admires Ariel Sharon.

== See also ==
- Managerial state
