= Cultural determinism =

Concept in social science

Cultural determinism is the belief that the culture in which we are raised determines who we are at emotional and behavioral levels. It contrasts with genetic determinism, the theory that biologically inherited traits and the environmental influences that affect those traits dominate who we are.

Yet another way of looking at the concept of cultural determinism is to contrast it with the idea of environmental determinism. The latter is the idea that the physical world- with all its constraints and potentially life-altering elements-is responsible for the make-up of each existing culture. Contrast this with the idea that we (humans) create our own situations through the power of thought, socialization, and all forms of information circulation.

It is also used to describe the concept that culture determines economic and political arrangements. It is an idea which has recurred in many cultures over human history, from ancient civilizations through the present.

== Cultural determinism as a political and economic influence ==
There are a number of theories of social development that describe culture as the factor that determines all of the others. This is distinct from theories of economic determinism such as that of Marx, namely that an individual or class' role in the means of production determines outlook and cultural roles (although some Marxists reject the label "economic determinism" as an accurate description of Marx's views). Political movements rooted in cultural determinism usually stand opposed to political and economic ideologies or consider them of lesser importance than factors such as religion, race, and nationality. However, cultural determinists do not necessarily disagree with Marx's view of social class as an important determining factor as well. The idea of cultural determinism is extremely common: numerous societies have believed that their habits, ideas and customs were what determined the shape of their political and economic arrangements, and were the source of their uniqueness above all else. This can be seen in adherence to national epics, particular religious customs, and focus on the importance of language as the determiner of national identity.

=== Examples in history ===
Romanticism had a large element of cultural determinism, and also shows interest in romantic behaviors drawn from writers such as Goethe, Fichte, August and Friedrich Schlegel. In the context of Romanticism, the geography molded individuals, and over time customs and culture related to that geography arose, and these, being in harmony with the place of the society, were better than arbitrarily imposed laws.

In media theory many writers take the position that political arrangements are determined by the mass media images that people see, and that these, by displacing other forms of culture, determine the economic and political arrangements.

In modern conservatism, individuals such as commentator Patrick Buchanan and economist Robert Barro argue that cultural norms determine the behavior of political arrangements. However, the cultural determinism of Buchanan and like-minded conservatives is currently a source of conflict among American conservatives.

== See also ==
- Arnold J. Toynbee
- Cultural pessimism
- Determinism
- Oswald Spengler
- Paleoconservatism
- Racialism (racial categorization)
- Romantic nationalism
- Standard social science model
- T. S. Eliot
- Tabula rasa
- Tribalism
