= Beautiful Losers: Essays on the Failure of American Conservatism =

1993 essay collection by Samuel T. Francis

Beautiful Losers
- Author: Samuel T. Francis
- Language: English
- Published: 1993
- Publisher: University of Missouri Press
- Publication place: United States
- Media type: Print
- Pages: 237
- ISBN: 978-0-8262-0907-8

Beautiful Losers: Essays on the Failure of American Conservatism is a 1993 collection of political essays by American political theorist Samuel T. Francis, published by the University of Missouri Press. The book brings together essays and review articles dealing with the history of the American conservative movement, neoconservatism, the New Right, political power, cultural conflict, and the influence of political theorist James Burnham.

The collection's main argument is the postwar American conservative movement had failed to reverse the institutional and cultural changes it opposed and had instead become incorporated into the political order it had originally sought to challenge. Francis expanded on Burnham's theory of the managerial revolution, arguing political conflict should be understood partly as a struggle among social elites. He further argued conservatives required a new political constituency around what he termed "Middle American Radicals."

The book a range of reviews Some conservative reviewers praised Francis's analysis of political power and his criticism of established conservatism. Others criticized Francis' hostility to neoconservatives, his pessimism, his conception of political power, and the implications of his proposed Middle American politics. Later scholars have examined Francis's arguments as part of the intellectual history of paleoconservatism and populist politics in the United States.

== Background ==
Francis wrote Beautiful Losers after working for conservative institutions in Washington, D.C., and while serving as an editor and columnist at The Washington Times. By the late 1980s and early 1990s, he had become associated with the paleoconservative critique of the mainstream conservative movement, particularly its neoconservative wing.

The University of Missouri Press described the book in the context of the 1992 United States presidential election, arguing the campaign exposed divisions within the Republican Party and provided the immediate setting for Francis's contention that the defeat of President George H. W. Bush represented a deeper crisis for American conservatism.

The collection also incorporated essays Francis had written during earlier debates within the American right, including "Message from Middle American Radicals: The Social Politics of the New Right" and "Neoconservatism and the Managerial Revolution". These essays became important to later scholarly discussions of Francis's political theory.

== Arguments ==
=== Failure of movement conservatism ===
The title essay presents Francis's general indictment of what is often called movement conservatism. Despite Republican electoral victories and the growth of a large conservative institutional network, conservatives had failed to reverse most of the political and cultural developments against which the movement had defined itself. His definition of failure was broader than electoral defeat. Francis distinguished between winning elections and acquiring sufficient institutional power to alter the underlying direction of American government and society. He argued conservative organizations had become increasingly professionalized, which reduced their ability or willingness to challenge it fundamentally.

=== The managerial revolution ===
A key influence on the book is James Burnham's The Managerial Revolution. Burnham argued the development of large administrative organizations had produced a new class of professional administrators.

Francis adapted this theory to postwar American politics. In his account, the older bourgeois elite associated with traditional forms of property had lost influence to a managerial elite whose power depended upon large bureaucratic organizations in government and the non-profit sector. David T. Byrne, in a biography of Burnham, described Francis as considering himself an intellectual heir to Burnham.

=== Middle American Radicals ===
Francis proposed that a new right-wing political movement should seek support among what he called "Middle American Radicals", or "MARs". The concept drew on sociological research into middle-income voters who felt politically alienated from both economic and governmental elites and from groups they believed received preferential treatment from those elites.

Francis described these voters as a potential constituency capable of supporting a populist challenge to the existing political establishment. Instead of concentrating primarily on tax reduction or free-market economics, he argued that a successful movement should connect economic concerns with issues of national identity, crime, immigration, family, and cultural authority.

In his 2018 study of Francis, political scientist Hirotaka Inoue argued that Francis's conception of Middle American politics combined class-based political mobilization with an increasingly racial conception of political identity. Inoue maintained that Francis's later development of the MARs theory made whiteness an important component of the political coalition he envisioned.

Jean-François Drolet's 2026 study of the intellectual history of contemporary American right-wing foreign policy likewise identified Francis as a particularly influential paleoconservative theorist. Drolet argued that Francis transformed earlier sociological work on alienated middle-income Americans into a political strategy for a culturally conservative, populist challenge to established elites.

== Reviews ==
Beautiful Losers received a range of views publications. Publishers Weekly described the collection as provacative. Brian Doherty of Reason regarded Francis's adaptation of James Burnham's managerial theory as intellectually substantial but criticized the abstract prose of the book. Doherty further argued Francis's program would redirect rather than limit state power.

Dan Himmelfarb of Commentary focused critically on Francis's attacks on neoconservatism. First Things praised Francis's abilities as a writer but critiqued his vision of paleoconservatism. Brad Stetson of the New Oxford Review credited Francis with identifying genuine tensions between conservative rhetoric.

More sympathetic reviewers also expressed reservations. Paul Gottfried agreed with Francis's criticism of institutional conservatism but argued his reliance on Burnham-style analysis placed too much weight on material power Matthew Rose argued Francis reduced politics too heavily to struggles among groups for power. Rose's later book A World after Liberalism consequently situated Francis among intellectual figures associated with the modern paleoconservative right.

== Legacy ==
Following the rise of Donald Trump, writers revisited Beautiful Losers due to perceived parallels between Francis's proposed Middle American coalition and later populist politics. The phrase "beautiful losers" itself has been used by some writers as shorthand for conservatives perceived as rhetorically opposed to liberal institutions but unwilling to displace them. In a 2025 retrospective, Gottfried described Beautiful Losers as the principal Francis book published during his lifetime by a major university press.

== See also ==
- Paleoconservatism
- Conservatism in the United States
- New Right (United States)
- James Burnham
- The Managerial Revolution
- Neoconservatism
- Right-wing populism in the United States
