= Thomas Fleming (political writer) =

American writer and political commentator

Thomas Fleming (born 1945) is a traditionalist Catholic writer, former president of the Rockford Institute, and former editor of Chronicles: A Magazine of American Culture, a monthly paleoconservative political magazine.

Fleming has been described as a leading figure in developing neo-Confederate ideology. He was a founding member of the League of the South, and a founding editor of Southern Partisan magazine in 1979, but later left both organizations.

== Biography ==
Thomas Fleming was awarded a doctorate in classics from the University of North Carolina at Chapel Hill, completing his dissertation on Attic Greek lyric poetry, and until joining a series of conservative groups, taught Latin at a small, private middle school in South Carolina. In addition to editing, Fleming has written on topics concerning the literature of pagan Greece as well as political issues.

Fleming was introduced to the paleoconservative public by Robert W. Whitaker of South Carolina in 1982. At that time, he was invited to contribute to Whitaker's book, The New Right Papers, which put together ways whereby conservative populists could be elected to office through an alliance of people from both parties in the Republican Party.

Fleming was a founding member and board member of the League of the South, from which he was reported to have resigned in 2002, as well as an affiliated scholar of its educational arm, the League of the South Institute. He was a founding editor of the Southern Partisan magazine in 1979, with Clyde Wilson. Its masthead included "a range of conservative figures from old segregationists to New Right leaders", as described by the academics Euan Hague and Edward Sebesta. He left in 1983 after disputes at the magazine. In 1985, after the death of author Leopold Tyrmand, Fleming became editor of Chronicles Magazine. In 1988 he co-wrote The Conservative Movement with Paul Gottfried.

As of June 2015, Fleming retired as editor of Chronicles magazine, but continued contributing articles on an occasional basis. As of the July 2015 issue of Chronicles, the magazine's former Senior Editor For Books, Chilton Williamson Jr., became editor for the publication. In December 2022, Fleming returned once more to Chronicles to take the mantle of editorship at the magazine.

== Views ==
Fleming has been described as a leading figure in developing neo-Confederate ideology.

=== Immigration ===
Criticizing mass immigration into the United States, Fleming, in an essay in Immigration and the American Future, wrote that American elites peddle a form of propositionalism: "This abstract approach to assimilation derives, ultimately, from the conviction - as naive as it is chauvinistic - that America is an exceptional country, one not rooted in blood, soil, and kinship, but a nation 'dedicated to the proposition that all men are created equal'. Proponents of this are quick to label the more old-fashioned view, that the nation is a metaphorical extended family, as bigotry, but no amount of repetition or rhetorical extravagance can disguise the dangerous logic that is at work. If I love my country because it is mine, I must be loyal to it, even when I disagree with its policies, but I do not necessarily regard it as superior to everyone else's country, and I may have no inclination to say that all other countries, to the extent that they are legitimate and worthy of respect, must approximate my own."

He then explains how this type of American propositionalism impacts immigration: "But that this is exactly what the advocates of the "propositional nation" do insist upon. The United States is not only the best nation in the history of the world, but also it is the beacon to all mankind, the natural home of all the good and decent people in the world and the enemy to all regimes that deny their subjects equal rights. Thus, by the same argument, a propositional nation is obliged to open its borders to strangers "yearning to breathe free," but it is also justified in engaging in endless crusades to impose its propositions on the rest of the world."

=== Ron Paul ===
Chronicles Magazine often runs news articles of interest to the old right. Writing on Congressman Ron Paul and his bid for the presidency, Fleming wrote: "Dr. Paul has his zany side: He believes in the Constitution of the old American republic, and he actually thinks it has some relevance for America today. God bless him, I would vote for him if only for pretending to embrace such a heartwarming fantasy. As it is, I am convinced he believes what he says. (His candor and sincerity alone are enough to disqualify him as a serious presidential candidate in these United States.) Paul not only wants, in principle, to restore the republic but also opposes the continued erosion of states' rights and U.S. sovereignty."

Like Paul, Fleming favors non-interventionism and has attacked some of its supporters as "dumb-as-a-pile-of-rocks Tea-Partiers who have sold their souls... to anti-Christian neoconservatives".

=== Religion ===
Fleming affirms the Roman Catholic doctrine of papal supremacy and has urged the Eastern Orthodox Churches to submit to the immediate, universal jurisdiction and absolute authority of the See of Rome. He notes, "The Eastern position, from fairly early on and down to fairly late, was unequivocal in acknowledging the primacy of the Roman bishop, and even today most Orthodox bishops and theologians I know concede that if the Church were reunited, the heir of Peter would preside over the meetings of the patriarchs – indeed, in some Eastern ecclesiastical disputes in recent years, appeals have been made to the Pope."

He has said "the problem is not Islamicist extremism. The problem is Islam itself."

== Controversial statements ==
Fleming has made several controversial statements regarded by some as racist in nature, although he denies that he and most paleoconservatives support racism. Examples of incendiary comments include the following statements taken from his columns in Chronicles:

- "In South Africa and Rhodesia, it is hard to understand the position taken by English liberals whose efforts on behalf of Africans reached entirely predictable conclusions. In the post War South, a very basic struggle was engaged between Whites and Blacks. The old Bourbons—who were hardly less racist than the populists who succeeded them—made some attempt to protect the interests of Black people, especially the small middle class and those whose families had been attached to them. There was also a sense of noblesse oblige. These honorable sentiments, however, seemed a bit antiquated in the midst of Reconstruction, and the ill effects of the Second Reconstruction, still being experienced in acute form in most of the USA, is a warning against social revolution."
- "What is racial profiling, if not an acknowledgment that different racial and ethnic groups are statistically more likely than other groups to engage in different sorts of illegal behavior. The Irish, who have a genetic weakness for alcohol, are too prone to get into fights, while Sicilians and South Italians have demonstrated an amazing ability to organize extortion, protection, prostitution, and gambling rackets. When O. J. Simpson kills a white woman or engages in other violent acts, he is simply living up to a statistical stereotype that informs us that African Americans, who make up less than 15% of the population, commit roughly 50% of violent crimes. And, O. J. is as exemplary a representative of his group's criminality as Bernie Madoff, John Gotti, Mohammed Atta, and Joaquin 'El Chapo' Loera Guzman (a billionaire Mexican drug lord who made the exclusive Forbes list in 2009) are of theirs."

The Southern Poverty Law Center has listed Fleming as a key intellectual in the neo-Confederate movement. In a 2002 article on the paleoconservative trend in right wing politics, the SPLC stated: "While mainstream neo-conservatives are tight with the GOP, so-called paleocon intellectuals have carved a niche for themselves as staunch, old-right traditionalists who romanticize the pre-civil rights era South. Fleming, who is Chronicles' editor, has gone so far as to describe the 19th century Ku Klux Klan as a 'national liberation army.'"

Fleming has strenuously denied these allegations, writing: "It is an easy trick of propaganda to portray all natural affections in the dark colors of prejudice. Why would anyone like the South if it were not for slavery and Jim Crow? Who but an antisemite objects to the slaughter of the (semitic) Palestinians? Only a communist or a Jew would oppose the Führer. . . . The average American does have a conservative heart, but his mind has been so addled by bad teachers, bad books, and bad ideas that he often feels guilty if he prefers to limit his charity to his neighbors, if he resents the money squandered on public schools, if he does not share in the general glee over the massive immigration that is transforming the country of his fathers into something he cannot recognize. He is easily intimidated when the left condemns this vague, inchoate mixture of family loyalty and patriotism as the bigotry of the "extreme right." In fact, the ultraleft Southern Poverty Law Center is always railing against "right-wing extremism," by which they mean everyone to the right of The New Republic—up to and including Matthew Hale. . . . Why should any conservative care if he is attacked by the leftists of the SPLC and ADL or those of the New York Times? These people have lies in their mouths, blood on their hands for the great genocides of the 20th century, and guilt on their consciences for the seduction of the innocent and the destruction of our civilization. Our task, as our late friend Mel Bradford put it, is to remember who we are and stop our ears against the siren songs of the revolutionists, which have proved to be not the anthems of a new dawn but a message of hate and filth that leads to destruction."

== Books ==
- "Old Rights and New Right" in The New Right Papers, Robert W. Whitaker, Ed. (1982) ISBN 0-312-56927-0.
- The Conservative Movement (1988, with Paul Gottfried) ISBN 0-8057-9724-6.
- West Point: Blue and Grey (1988) ISBN 1-59687-356-6.
- The Politics of Human Nature (1993) ISBN 1-56000-693-5.
- Fleming, Thomas (2002). Montenegro: The Divided Land. Rockford, Illinois: Chronicles Press. ISBN 9780961936495.
- The Morality of Everyday Life: Rediscovering an Ancient Alternative to the Liberal Tradition (2004) ISBN 0-8262-1509-2.
- Socialism (2007) ISBN 0-7614-2632-9.
