= Paul Gottfried =

American political philosopher (born 1941)

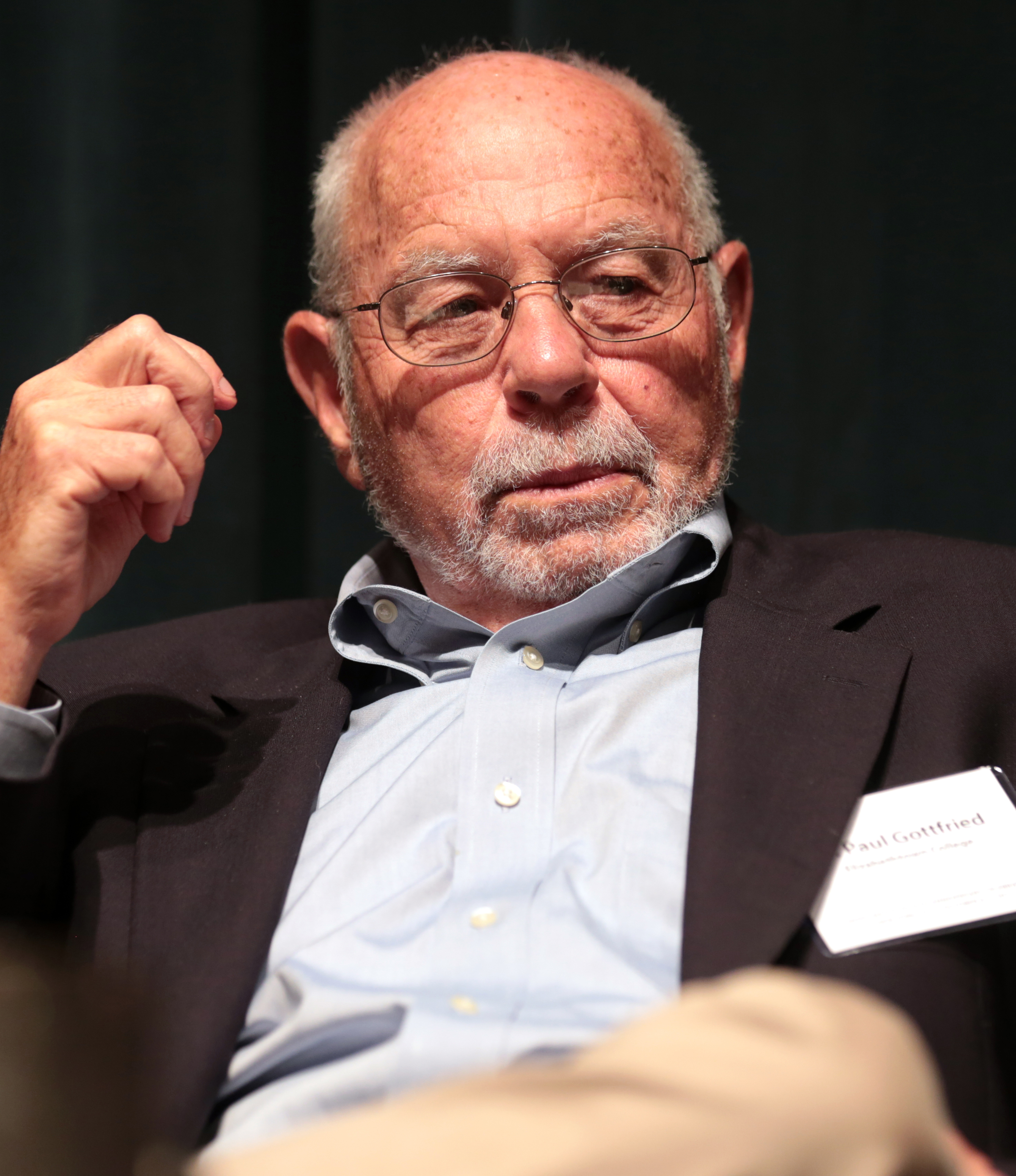
- Gottfried speaking in 2017
- Born: Paul Edward Gottfried; 21 November 1941 (age 84); New York City, U.S.

Education
- Education: Yeshiva University (BA); Yale University (MS, PhD)
- Thesis: Catholic Romanticism in Munich, 1826–1834 (1968)
- Doctoral advisor: Herbert Marcuse

Philosophical work
- Era: Contemporary philosophy
- Region: Western philosophy American philosophy
- School: Paleoconservatism
- Institutions: ISSEP (member); Mises Institute (associated scholar)
- Main interests: Welfare state, pluralism, Romanticism
- Notable ideas: Therapeutic state, movement conservatism, alternative right, white nationalism (denied)

Paul Edward Gottfried (born November 21, 1941) is an American paleoconservative, political philosopher, intellectual historian, and writer. He is a former professor of humanities at Elizabethtown College in Pennsylvania. He is editor-in-chief of the paleoconservative magazine Chronicles. He is an associated scholar at the Mises Institute, a libertarian think tank, and the US correspondent of Nouvelle École, a Nouvelle Droite journal.

Gottfried helped coin the terms paleoconservative in 1986 and alternative right (with Richard Spencer) in 2008. The Southern Poverty Law Center (SPLC) has described him as a "far-right thinker" and characterizes the H.L. Mencken Club, which he founded, as a white nationalist group. Although noted for working with far-right and alt-right groups and figures, he has said that he does "not want to be in the same camp with white nationalists" or associated with pro-Nazis, "as somebody whose family barely escaped from the Nazis in the '30s".

== Early life and education ==
Gottfried was born in 1941 to a Jewish family in the Bronx, New York City. His father, Andrew Gottfried, was a furrier from Budapest who had fled Hungary after the July Putsch of 1934. The family relocated to Bridgeport, Connecticut, soon after Paul Gottfried's birth. Andrew Gottfried had a fur business in Bridgeport and was involved in its Hungarian Jewish community.

Gottfried attended Yeshiva University in New York as an undergraduate. He returned to Connecticut to attend Yale for graduate school, where he studied under Herbert Marcuse (with whom he disagreed). He defended his thesis on Catholic Romanticism in Munich, 1826–1834 in 1968.

== Career ==
Gottfried had written 13 books as of 2016. With Thomas Fleming in 1986 he coined the term paleoconservative (a term he identifies with), and with Richard Spencer in 2008 he coined alternative right. He has aimed to revitalize the Old Right to counter neoconservative and neoliberal influence in the conservative movement. He is considered a prominent reactionary critic of the Republican Party and has called himself a "right-wing pluralist".

He is a former Horace Raffensperger Professor of Humanities at Elizabethtown College in Elizabethtown, Pennsylvania, as well as a Guggenheim Fellowship recipient. He moved to Elizabethtown after his first wife died, and taught at the college until "a school official encouraged his early exit", according to a 2016 article in Tablet.

Gottfried was a friend of Richard Nixon after Nixon resigned from the presidency. Gottfried was expelled as a contributor to National Review in the 1980s; interviewed in 2017, he said National Review "didn’t throw anybody out because they were racist," but alleged that it and the conservative movement had been captured by interests supportive of immigration and multiculturalism. In the 1980s, he edited the journal Continuity for the Intercollegiate Studies Institute, which included some neo-Confederate writing. He was a key advisor in the 1990s to Pat Buchanan, notably during Buchanan's campaign in the 1992 Republican primaries against President George H. W. Bush. He worked for the journal Telos, which embraced some far-right causes. He is opposed to nation-building and is a critic of American interventionist foreign policy. He has written that Murray Rothbard was a close friend and influence.

Gottfried is an associated scholar at the Mises Institute, a libertarian think tank. In 2018, he joined the Institut des sciences sociales, économiques et politiques (Institute of Social, Economic and Political Sciences), founded by Marion Maréchal and Thibaut Monnier, in Lyon, France. Gottfried is the US correspondent of Nouvelle École, a Nouvelle Droite journal founded by GRECE in 1968.

In 2008, Gottfried founded the H.L. Mencken Club, a group the SPLC has described as white nationalist. Richard Spencer was a board member. It is named for the famous writer H.L. Mencken; a Village Voice article about the club in 2013 noted Mencken's casual racism. The Village Voice said the club was "overwhelmingly geriatric" and met in airport hotels near Baltimore. Marilyn Mayo of the Anti-Defamation League (ADL) Center on Extremism said the ADL did not consider the club a hate group, but that it "attracts a number of white supremacists to their conferences".

Gottfried has spoken at American Renaissance conferences and written essays for VDARE. An Intelligencer article about the far right in 2017 summarized Gottfried as a "nativist strategist" who had "spent a career agitating for an ethno-nationalist conservatism that celebrated white Western values and lamented what feminism and multiculturalism had done to dilute them".

=== Coining of alt-right and associations ===
Gottfried helped coin the term alternative right with a speech to the H.L. Mencken Club in 2008 envisioning a nationalist and populist right-wing movement; it was published by Richard Spencer in Taki's Magazine with the title "The Decline and Rise of the Alternative Right". Gottfried has been described as a former intellectual mentor to Spencer. As of 2010, according to the SPLC, Gottfried was a senior contributing editor at Alternative Right, a website edited by Spencer. He and Spencer co-edited a book in 2015.

In a 2016 article in the online magazine Tablet titled "The Alt-Right's Jewish Godfather", Gottfried said, "Whenever I look at Richard [Spencer], I see my ideas coming back in a garbled form." He also said, "I just do not want to be in the same camp with white nationalists," and "As somebody whose family barely escaped from the Nazis in the '30s, I do not want to be associated with people who are pro-Nazi." Jacob Siegel, author of the Tablet article, described Gottfried as having "tried to build a postfascist, postconservative politics of the far-right" for the past 20 years, but that "Spencer and his acolytes wanted to cross the threshold into fascist thought and beliefs".

In 2018, Robert Fulford of the National Post described Gottfried as the "godfather of alt-right" and wrote that Gottfried's paleoconservative ideas were a major source of the alt-right phenomenon. Three weeks later, Gottfried published a response article objecting to some of its points. He wrote, "I do know Richard Spencer and worked with him in 2010 when he edited the Taki's Magazine website. We did develop the term 'Alternative Right' together — it was a headline he put on one of my articles. But my subsequent strategic differences with him are a matter of public record, which should have been noted."

== Books ==
- Conservative Millenarians: The Romantic Experience in Bavaria. Fordham University Press (1979). ISBN 978-0-82320982-8.
- The Search for Historical Meaning: Hegel and the Postwar American Right. Northern Illinois University Press (1986). ISBN 0-87580114-5.
- The Conservative Movement. Boston: Twayne Publishing (1988); 2nd ed. with Thomas Fleming (1992). ISBN 0-80579724-6.
- Carl Schmitt: Politics and Theory. Greenwood Press (1990). ISBN 0-31327209-3.
- After Liberalism: Mass Democracy in the Managerial State. New Forum vol. 18. Princeton University Press (2001). ISBN 0-69108982-5.
- Multiculturalism and the Politics of Guilt: Towards a Secular Theocracy. University of Missouri Press (2002). ISBN 0-826214177.
- The Strange Death of Marxism: The European Left in the New Millennium. University of Missouri Press (2005). ISBN 0-826215971.
- Conservatism in America: Making Sense of the American Right. Palgrave-Macmillan (2007). ISBN 0-23061479-5.
- Encounters: My Life with Nixon, Marcuse, and Other Friends and Teachers. Wilmington, DL: Intercollegiate Studies Institute (2009). ISBN 978-1-93385999-6.
- Leo Strauss and the American Conservative Movement. Cambridge University Press (2012). ISBN 978-1-10701724-5.
- War and Democracy. Arktos (2012). ISBN 978-1-90716680-8.
- Fascism: The Career of a Concept. Northern Illinois University Press (2015). ISBN 978-0-87580493-4.
- Revisions and Dissents. Northern Illinois University Press (2017). ISBN 978-0-87580762-1.
- The Vanishing Tradition: Perspectives on American Conservatism. Northern Illinois University Press (2020).
- Antifascism: The Course of a Crusade. Northern Illinois University Press (2021). ISBN 978-1-50175935-2.
- A Paleoconservative Anthology: New Voices for an Old Tradition. Ed. Paul Gottfried. Rowman & Littlefield (2023). ISBN 9781666919738.
- The Essential Paul Gottfried: Essays from 1984-2024. Passage Press (2024). ISBN 978-1-959403-63-0

== See also ==
- Neoconservatism and paleoconservatism
- Sam T. Francis
