= Rockford Institute =

American paleoconservative think tank

- Named after: Rockford College
- Merged into: Charlemagne Institute
- Successor: Charlemagne Institute
- Formation: 1976 (50 years ago)
- Founder: John A. Howard
- Founded at: Rockford, IL
- Dissolved: 2018 (8 years ago)
- Type: nonprofit
- Tax ID no.: 36-3062112
- Legal status: 501(c)(3)
- Purpose: cultural advocacy
- Headquarters: Rockford, IL; United States
- Budget: Revenue: $467,026; Expenses: $1,148,857 (FYE June 2016)

The Rockford Institute was an American conservative think-tank associated with paleoconservatism, based in Rockford, Illinois. Founded in 1976, it ran the John Randolph Club and published the magazine Chronicles. In 2018 the Rockford Institute merged with the Charlemagne Institute (renamed from Intellectual Takeout in 2018), which became the new publisher of Chronicles. The Charlemagne Institute describes itself as "leading a cultural movement to defend and advance Western Civilization, the foundation of our American republic."

Chronicles, the Rockford Institute, and since 2018 the Charlemagne Institute have been described as central to the paleoconservative intellectual movement. Chronicles peaked in the 1990s and helped shape the paleoconservative revival that accompanied Patrick Buchanan's 1992 and 1996 presidential campaigns. At its peak, it had 15,000 subscribers. As of September 2016 there were 6,700 subscribers.

== History ==
The Rockford Institute was founded in 1976 by Rockford College president John A. Howard as a response to American social changes of the 1960s. Allan Carlson served as president until 1997. He and Howard left to found The Howard Center for Family, Religion and Society which opposes abortion, divorce, and homosexuality, promoting instead the "child-rich, married parent" family, an offshoot of the Rockford Institute. It was located in Rockford, Illinois.

Thomas Fleming, editor of Chronicles, succeeded Carlson as president of the Rockford Institute. The institute also retained the Ingersoll Prize, which the Rockford Institute had established in 1983 to honor conservative thinkers. Fleming, a founding member of the League of the South, was described as a neo-Confederate by the Southern Poverty Law Center (SPLC).

In 1988 the institute and Richard John Neuhaus, a Lutheran pastor, invited Cardinal Ratzinger to give a lecture in New York in January. On 5 May 1989 Neuhaus and his Religion and Society Center were evicted from the institute's New York office after he complained about what he said were "the racist and anti-Semitic tones" of Chronicles. The charge, which was supported by other leading conservatives, was denied by the institute. They said the office, called Rockford East, was closed for budgetary reasons and because of concerns that Neuhaus was not following institute policies. The split was seen by leading conservatives as a sign of the division between the paleoconservative and the neo-conservative elements of the movement.

=== John Randolph Club ===
The John Randolph Club (1989–1995) was a project of the Rockford Institute to promote alliances between paleoconservatives and paleolibertarians. The club has been described as neo-Confederate, promoting secession, and favoring white Southerners. Founding members included the radical libertarian Murray Rothbard, Jared Taylor of the white nationalist journal American Renaissance, the white nationalist Peter Brimelow, the writer Samuel Francis, and the journalist and politician Pat Buchanan. It was named for John Randolph (described by the historian Quinn Slobodian as "a slaveholder whose catchphrase was 'I love liberty, I hate equality'"). Chronicles promoted the club's activities.

=== Merger and renaming ===
In 2018 the Rockford Institute merged with the Charlemagne Institute (renamed from Intellectual Takeout in 2018), which became the new publisher of Chronicles. As of 2021 Devin C. Foley is listed as the Charlemagne Institute's chief executive officer.

== Chronicles magazine ==
Chronicles is a U.S. monthly magazine published by the Rockford Institute. Its full current name is Chronicles: A Magazine of American Culture. The magazine is known for promoting anti-globalism, anti-intervention, and anti-immigration stances within conservative politics, and is considered one of the leading paleoconservative publications.

As of 2017, the executive editor was Aaron D. Wolf and, as of 2012, Srđa Trifković was editor for foreign affairs. Contributors over the years have included the conservative activist Peter Gemma. As of 2021, its website names Paul Gottfried as its Interim Editor-in-Chief and Edmund Welsch as Executive Editor, and was hosted by (and listed as a programme of) the Charlemagne Institute.

In 2000, James Warren of The Chicago Tribune called Chronicles "right-leaning" and wrote, "There are few publications more cerebral". He described a Chronicles article criticizing the finances of Donald Trump, who was then considering a Reform Party presidential campaign.

The Southern Poverty Law Center (SPLC) described Chronicles in 2017 as "a publication with strong neo-Confederate ties that caters to the more intellectual wing of the white nationalist movement", and in another article said it was "controversial even among conservatives for its racism and anti-Semitism".

=== Editors ===
- Leopold Tyrmand 1977–1985
- Thomas Fleming, 1985
- Paul Gottfried

== See also ==
- Howard Center for Family, Religion and Society
