= Melvin Bradford =

Melvin Bradford may refer to:

- Mel Bradford (1934–1993), American writer
- Melvin "Mel-Man" Bradford, American record producer
