= Chilton Williamson Jr. =

American author

Chilton Williamson Jr. is an American author. 2015–2019, he was the editor of Chronicles and acting president of the Rockford Institute.

He is also known for his novel Mexico Way (2008).

== Biography ==
Williamson was born in New York City. His father was a former Barnard history professor, Chilton Williamson.

Williamson graduated from Trinity School, and attended Bowdoin College in Maine for a year before transferring to Columbia, graduating in 1969. He majored in European history, and studied American history.

Williamson moved in 1979 to Wyoming, where he worked on a drilling rig in the gas fields. He then wrote the book Roughnecking It (1982) and later said "It was the best year of my life, and I made lasting friends." He also lived two years in New Mexico.

1976–1989, he was a literary editor of The National Review.

In 1989 he started writing for Chronicles, where he wrote the columns "The Hundredth Meridian" and "What's Wrong With the World". Williamson was its senior editor for books since 1989, and became editor of the magazine in June 2015. The book The Hundredth Meridian (2005) is a collection of columns he wrote for Chronicles, in which the Western landscape becomes a character in itself.

Williamson has also written for the publications Catholic World Report, Harper's, The New Republic, Commonweal, The New Leader, The American Spectator, Crisis and The Nation.

In The Conservative Bookshelf, Williamson selected fifty books.

== Bibliography ==
Williamson has written works of fiction, narrative nonfiction, and nonfiction, some of which are:

- Saltbound: A Block Island Winter (Methuen, 1980)
- Roughnecking It: Or, Life in the Overthrust (1982)
- Trilogy:
  - Desert Light (St. Martin's, 1987) (Novel)
  - The Homestead (1990) (Novel)
  - Jerusalem, Jerusalem! (2017, Chronicles Press) (Novel)
- Mexico Way (2008)
- The Education of Héctor Villa
- After Tocqueville: The Promise and Failure of Democracy (ISI Books, 2012)
- The Hundredth Meridian (A collection of 22 columns in Chronicles)
- The Conservative Bookshelf
