= Clyde N. Wilson =

American historian

Clyde Norman Wilson (born 11 June 1941) is an American retired professor of history at the University of South Carolina, a paleoconservative political commentator, a long-time contributing editor for Chronicles: A Magazine of American Culture and Southern Partisan magazine, and an occasional contributor to National Review.

Wilson is known for his work on the life and writings of John C. Calhoun, having compiled all his papers in twenty-eight volumes. He has been the M.E. Bradford Distinguished Chair of the Abbeville Institute, an adjunct faculty member of the paleolibertarian Ludwig von Mises Institute, and an affiliated scholar of the League of the South Institute, the research arm of the League of the South.

In 1994 Wilson was an original founder of the League of the South, which advocates a "natural societal order of superiors and subordinates", using as an example, "Christ is the head of His Church; husbands are the heads of their families; parents are placed over their children; employers rank above their employees; the teacher is superior to his students, etc." The League of the South has been described as a white supremacist and white nationalist organization.

== Early life and education ==
Clyde Norman Wilson was born on June 11, 1941, in Greensboro, North Carolina, where he was raised. His father, Clyde Sr., a fireman, was a leader in the state Firefighters Union and was chosen to train and command the first African-American fire company in Greensboro. Clyde Jr. was editor of the Greensboro High School newspaper in his senior year, receiving a special commendation from the Columbia University Scholastic Press Association for editorial writing. During that year, 1958–1959, the high school was the first in North Carolina to be integrated.

Wilson graduated BA from the University of North Carolina at Chapel Hill in 1963, proceeding to an MA in 1964. While a student he worked for the Greensboro Daily News, The Greensboro Record, the Winston-Salem Journal, and the Chapel Hill Weekly, and wrote a regular column for the campus Daily Tar Heel. From 1964 he spent several years as a reporter for the Richmond News Leader and the Charlotte News, covering police, courts, and other matters.

In 1971 Wilson received a PhD in history from the University of North Carolina. As a post-graduate student he published articles in historical journals such as The North Carolina Historical Review and Civil War Times, and in opinion journals like Modern Age, Intercollegiate Review, and National Review.

== Career ==
Wilson became Assistant Professor of History at the University of South Carolina in 1971; Associate Professor, 1977; Professor, 1983. In 1977 he became editor of The Papers of John C. Calhoun, producing volumes 10 through the completion of the edition with volume 28 in 2003. Wilson's work on Calhoun drew praise such as "shows high ability in the field of intellectual history" (Journal of American History), "plows new ground by the acre" (Virginia Magazine of History & Biography), and many others of similar import.

In 32 years at the University of South Carolina, Wilson taught a variety of courses and directed 16 doctoral dissertations, four of which became books.

Wilson early identified himself as an intellectual heir of Richard Weaver and the Southern Agrarians. In 1980 he assisted Thomas Fleming in founding Southern Partisan magazine, and subsequently became a contributing editor of Chronicles when Fleming became editor of that journal. In 1981, Wilson brought together the book Why the South Will Survive, by Fifteen Southerners, a restatement of the Agrarian message of I'll Take My Stand on its fiftieth anniversary. The volume included contributions by Cleanth Brooks, Andrew Lytle, George Garrett, and others. In 1993 he was active in the formation of the League of the South and served on its board of directors for the first ten years. He has stated reasons for his role in creation of the League, alleging that it was necessary to preserve the unique features of Southern culture and to promote devolution from an over-centralized U.S. government.

The Southern Poverty Law Center has listed Wilson among the ideologues of the neo-Confederate movement. He told Gentleman's Quarterly in 1998 that "We don't want the federal government telling us what to do, pushing integration down our throats... We're tired of carpetbagging professionals coming to our campuses and teaching that the South is a cultural wasteland." Condemning what he perceives as a positive representation of people of color in the media, Wilson lamented that the "established forces of 'American' society have been promoting the glory of the non-white and the foreign for two generations now."

In a 2007 article addressing a debate exchange between presidential candidates Ron Paul and Rudy Giuliani, Wilson condemned the Voting Rights Act of 1965, writing: "Remember that since 1965 our elections have been controlled by commissars from the U.S. Justice Department—an oppression carried by the votes (several times repeated) of "conservative" Republicans. One of the highest comedic points of 20th century American politics came in the mid-sixties when the windbag Republican leader, Senator Dirksen of Illinois, announced his support for the second Reconstruction of the South. It seems that during a lonely midnight stroll in the deserted Capitol, the ghost of Abraham Lincoln appeared to the Senator and instructed him how to vote."

== Published work ==
Wilson has contributed more than 400 articles, essays, and reviews to a wide variety of academic and popular books and publications. He has lectured to scholarly, heritage, and political groups.

Books include Carolina Cavalier: The Life and Mind of James Johnston Pettigrew, an American Civil War biography that has gone through three editions; From Union to Empire: Essays in the Jeffersonian Tradition; and Defending Dixie: Essays in Southern History and Culture. In addition, he has contributed to a number of influential books, including The New Right Papers, (Robert W. Whitaker, Ed.). He has edited a number of books, including three volumes of The Dictionary of Literary Biography on American historians; The Essential Calhoun; John C. Calhoun: A Bibliography; and A Defender of Southern Conservatism: M.E. Bradford and His Achievements. He has also written for Telos.

Wilson is recipient of the Bostick Medal for Contributions to South Carolina Letters, the first annual John Randolph Club Award for Lifetime Achievement, and the Sons of Confederate Veterans Medal of Meritorious Service. In 2005 he was the founding Dean of the Stephen D. Lee Institute, an educational arm of the Sons of Confederate Veterans.
