= Mel Bradford =

American author and political commentator (1934–1993)

- Born: Melvin Eustace Bradford; May 8, 1934; Fort Worth, Texas, U.S.
- Died: March 3, 1993 (aged 58); Midland, Texas, U.S.
- Education: University of Oklahoma (BA, MA); Vanderbilt University (PhD)
- Occupations: literary critic and legal scholar
- Writing career
- Genre: non-fiction
- Notable work: The Reactionary Imperative
- Movements: Southern Agrarians, paleoconservatism

Melvin Eustace Bradford (May 8, 1934 – March 3, 1993) was an American conservative author, political commentator and professor of literature at the University of Dallas.

Bradford is seen as a leading figure of the paleoconservative wing of the conservative movement. He died just as the term paleoconservative was being coined and preferred the term traditional conservative. In his preface to The Reactionary Imperative, he wrote "Reaction is a necessary term in the intellectual context we inhabit in the twentieth century because merely to conserve is sometimes to perpetuate what is outrageous."

Bradford's conservatism was rooted within the heritage and traditions of the American South. He studied at Vanderbilt University and wrote his doctoral thesis under the Southern Agrarian and Fugitive Poet Donald Davidson (whose biography Bradford was wrapping up at the time of his sudden death at age 58), and thus was admitted to the succession of this movement to recover the Southern tradition.

Bradford was first and foremost a literary scholar and a student of rhetoric. He was known in literary circles for his work on William Faulkner, where Bradford stressed the importance of the Southern setting and the primacy of community in understanding the action of Faulkner's novels and stories. He "had no truck with critical efforts to portray Faulkner as alienated from the South. To the contrary, he saw the novelist as thoroughly embedded within his native region." Outside of literature he wrote extensively on the subjects of history and culture. Bradford specialized in the history of the American founding and Southern history in the United States. Bradford also advocated the constitutional theory of strict constructionism. "The original understanding of the Constitution, Bradford maintained, conformed much more closely to the Southern position than to Lincoln's acts of usurpation."

Bradford also frequently wrote for Modern Age, Chronicles magazine and Southern Partisan magazine.

== Biography ==
Bradford was born in Fort Worth, Texas and grew up there. He studied English at University of Oklahoma and completed his bachelor's and master's degrees. He then continued his education at Vanderbilt University and graduated with a Ph.D. He stayed in academia and taught at several institutions of higher education, including United States Naval Academy, Northwestern State University of Louisiana, and, primarily, the University of Dallas from 1967 until his death.

In U.S. presidential elections Bradford campaigned for Barry Goldwater in 1964, George C. Wallace in 1972, Ronald Reagan in 1976 and 1980, and Pat Buchanan in 1992.

He was for a time the president of the Philadelphia Society.

He died in 1993 after undergoing heart surgery.

== NEH Nomination ==
In 1980, Bradford was initially tapped by President-elect Ronald Reagan for chairman of the National Endowment for the Humanities. According to David Gordon, "Reagan's wish to elevate him to the prestigious post did not stem solely from Bradford's academic credentials. The president and he were acquaintances, and he had worked hard in Reagan's campaign for the Republican presidential nomination. Influential conservatives such as Russell Kirk and Sen. Jesse Helms also knew and admired Bradford." The selection met with intense objections from neoconservative figures, centering partly on Bradford's criticisms of President Abraham Lincoln. They circulated quotes of Bradford calling Lincoln "a dangerous man," and saying, "The image of Lincoln rose to be very dark" and "indeed almost sinister." He was even accused of comparing Lincoln to Adolf Hitler. "Bradford rejected Lincoln because he saw him as a revolutionary, intent on replacing the American Republic established by the Constitution with a centralized and leveling despotism." Another issue was Bradford's support for the 1972 presidential campaign of George C. Wallace. The neoconservative choice, William Bennett, was substituted for Bradford on November 13, 1981. Author Keith Preston later described the successful effort to cancel Bradford's nomination as symbolic of the cosmopolitan neoconservatives descended from liberalism establishing hegemony over the Republican Party and American conservatism, displacing more traditionalist and regionalist thinkers with ideological roots in the Old Right.

A letter supporting Bradford's nomination, sent to President Reagan during the controversy, was signed by John East, Jesse Helms, John Tower, Strom Thurmond, Orrin Hatch, Jeremiah Denton, Dan Quayle and James McClure and eight other Republican senators. Gerhart Niemeyer, Russell Kirk, Jeffrey Hart, William Buckley, M. Stanton Evans, Andrew Lytle, Harry Jaffa ("Bradford's principal intellectual antagonist"), and "dozens of others" were also named as supporters. Norman Podhoretz, Irving Kristol, William Kristol, Michael Joyce and William Simon were among Bennett's supporters.

== Bibliography ==
=== Books ===
- A Better Guide than Reason: Studies in the American Revolution (1979)
- Worthy Company: Brief Lives of the Framers of the Constitution (1982)
- Generations of the Faithful Heart: On the Literature of the South (1983)
- Remembering Who We Are: Observations of a Southern Conservative (1985)
- The Reactionary Imperative: Essays Literary and Political (1989)
- From Eden to Babylon: The Social and Political Essays of Andrew Nelson Lytle (1990)
- Religion and the Framers: Biographical Evidence (1991)
- Against the Barbarians, and Other Reflections on Familiar Themes (1992)
- Original Intentions: On the Making and Ratification of the Constitution (1993)

=== Major articles ===
- "A Fire Bell in the Night: The Southern Conservative View" (Modern Age, 1973)
- "The Heresy of Equality" (Modern Age, 1976)
- "Dividing The House: The Gnosticism of Lincoln's Political Rhetoric" (Modern Age, 1979)
- "On Remembering Who We Are" (Modern Age, 1982)
- "Rhetoric and Respectability" (Modern Age, 1988)

== Sources ==
- A Defender of Southern Conservatism: M.E. Bradford and his Achievements (1999) by Clyde N. Wilson (ISBN 0826212085)
- "Culture Clash on the Right" by David Frum, Wall Street Journal, June 2, 1989
- "Southern Conservatism and its Discontents: Mel Bradford and the American Right" by John Langdale in Southern Character: Essays in Honor of Bertram Wyatt-Brown (ISBN 0813036909)
