= Flaggers (movement) =

Neo-Confederate group

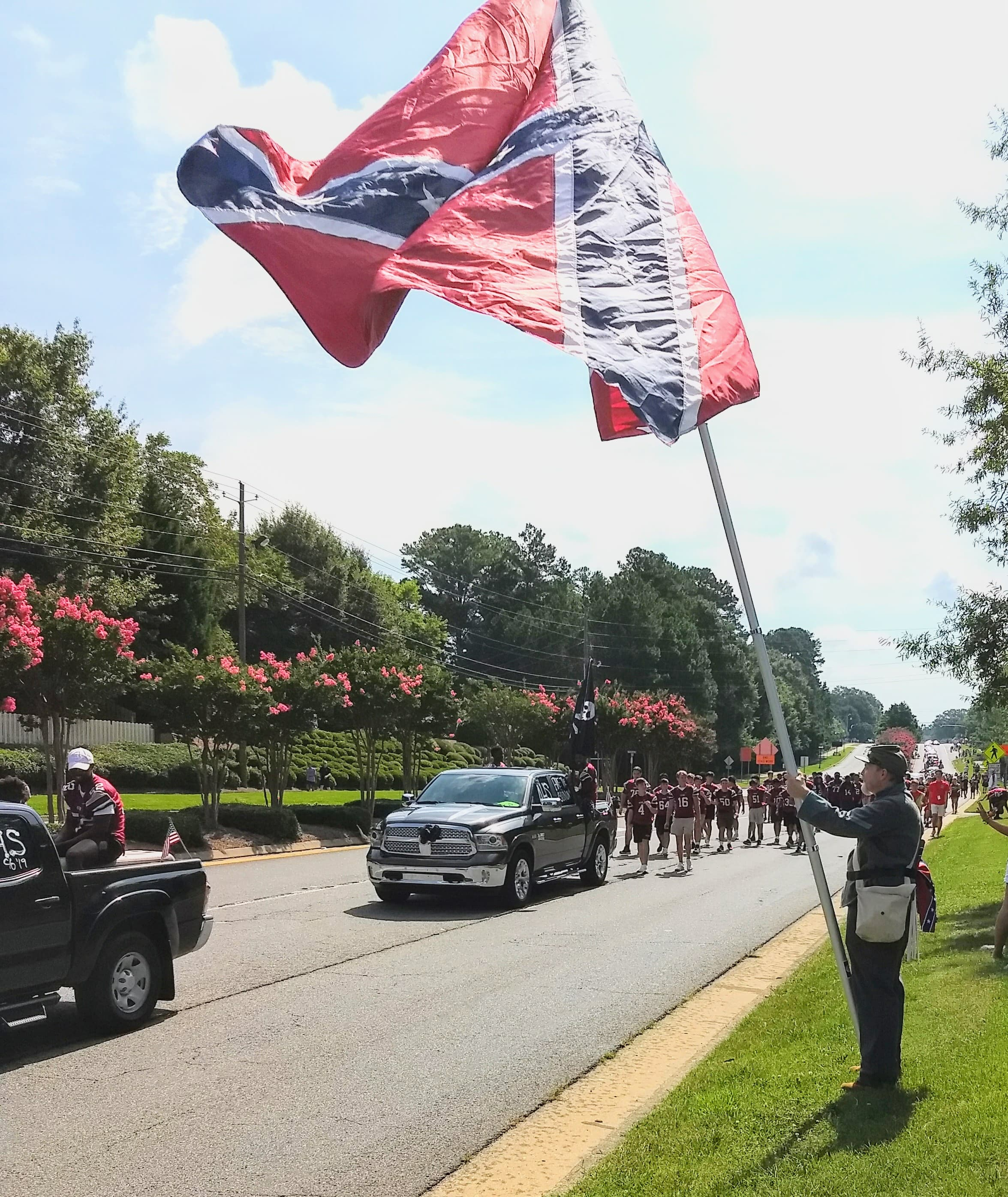
Georgian Flagger with large flag on 20 foot pole at Alpharetta Old Soldiers' Parade, Alpharetta, Georgia, August 4, 2018.

Flaggers are neo-Confederate activist groups active in the Southern United States. Flaggers usually operate at the state level. Their primary purpose is to make the Confederate battle flag as visible as possible.

Group members carry the flag at demonstrations and other public events, and erect it on private land. These flags are frequently visible from major highways, and have often been the subject of controversy and legal efforts to have them removed. Members, usually acting individually, also lobby or appear at meetings to speak against removal of Confederate monuments and memorials. Some have come out against celebrating Abraham Lincoln, while supporting the right of states to secede, i.e., claiming that the Confederacy was legitimate under U.S. law.

== Origin of flaggers ==
The 1956 flag of Georgia. Its 2001 "abolition" is cited as a major motivation behind the Flagger movement.

The earliest documentation of a flagger group as an organization is the Virginia Flaggers, whose website says they were founded in 2011. However, the flagger movement first appeared, spontaneously and unorganized, in Georgia in 2001. The flag of Georgia from 1956 to 2001 incorporated the Confederate battle flag. Responding in part to pressure from civil rights groups who threatened an economic boycott of Georgia, Governor Roy Barnes "ramrodded" a flag change bill through the legislature. The new flag, the appearance of which was the subject of controversy, was in use from 2001 to 2003. It included the 1956 flag (the design of which contained the Confederate battle flag) and four others, a subset of Georgia's numerous past flags. The North American Vexillological Association called it the worst-designed state flag in the country.

There was widespread opposition to the new flag, deemed the "Barnes flag". It led, according to Barnes himself, to his defeat for reelection two years later; the flag was a major issue in the election. A new flag was designed. In a non-binding 2004 referendum, 73% of the voters expressed a preference for the new flag, based on the first Confederate national flag, the Stars and Bars, over the 2001 design. (A return to the 1956 flag with the Confederate battle flag, desired by some, was not on the ballot.)

Flaggers, as they were soon called, began displaying the Confederate battle flag, or the 1956 Georgia flag which contained it, in 2001. They appeared at political rallies and at public appearances of legislators who had voted for the Barnes flag.

== Current flagger groups ==
As of 2018, the active flagger groups are:

- Virginia Flaggers, formed in 2011, have installed Confederate flags across the state: according to their Web site, 31 as of April 2020.
- Tennessee Confederate Flaggers
- Alabama Flaggers
- Delta (Mississippi) Flaggers, who make a point of demonstrating in front of businesses, schools, or any organization that does not fly the traditional and now former Mississippi flag which contains the Confederate battle flag (it was officially retired on June 30, 2020, and replaced on January 11, 2021).
- Georgia Flaggers
- "[T]he Sons of Confederate Veterans aims to raise a Confederate flag in all 100 counties in North Carolina in an initiative called 'Flags Across the Carolinas.' The initiative hopes to raise 'mega-sized,' 20 feet by 30 feet Confederate battle flags across the state by placing them on private properties with the consent of the property owners."
- Alamance County Taking Back Alamance County (ACTBAC), which was identified in 2016 and again in 2017 as a "neo-Confederate" hate group by the Southern Poverty Law Center, sought to raise Confederate flags at four locations surrounding Chapel Hill, North Carolina.

== See also ==
- Lost Cause of the Confederacy
- Modern display of the Confederate battle flag
