= Donald Livingston =

American philosopher

Donald W. Livingston is a former Professor of Philosophy at Emory University and a David Hume scholar. In 2003 he founded the Abbeville Institute, which is devoted to the study of Southern culture and political ideas.

== Early life and education ==
Livingston was raised in South Carolina. He received his doctorate at Washington University in St. Louis in 1965. He has been a National Endowment for the Humanities fellow and has been on the editorial board of Hume Studies and Chronicles: A Magazine of American Culture. Livingston is a convert from Anglicanism to the Eastern Orthodox Church. His wife Marie also received her Ph.D. in philosophy and has studied under Edmund Gettier and Alasdair MacIntyre.

Livingston is a member of the Sons of Confederate Veterans.

== Career ==
After teaching in several venues, Livingston became a professor of philosophy at Emory University in Atlanta, Georgia.

=== Philosophical views ===
He supports the compact theory of the United States, with its concomitant provisions for corporate resistance, nullification, and secession. He views the American Revolution not as a revolution but an act of secession, which has raised for some the concern "that characterizing the favorably-viewed American Revolution as a secession from Britain confers legitimacy on the later attempt by the Confederate states to secede from the Union (Livingston 1998)°—an attempt that, by most contemporary perspectives, wants for legitimacy (Simpson 2012)." Chris Hedges has called him "one of the intellectual godfathers of the secessionist movement."

Livingston was a member of the League of the South's Institute for the Study of Southern Culture and History, but left the group in the early 2000s. According to the Southern Poverty Law Center (SPLC), "Livingston told the Report that he was put off by the group’s racism and other 'political baggage'".

== Abbeville Institute ==
In 2003, Livingston founded the Abbeville Institute. According to its website, the Institute is "an association of scholars in higher education devoted to a critical study of what is true and valuable in the Southern tradition." The institute's work has been described as neo-Confederate by the Southern Poverty Law Center and sociologist James W. Loewen. Abbeville Institute scholars have promoted the Lost Cause myth, contending that the American Civil War was "not about slavery." The Institute is named for the town of Abbeville, South Carolina, often regarded as the birthplace of the Confederacy.

The Institute adopted as part of its mission statement the following by slavery historian Eugene Genovese: "Rarely these days, even on Southern campuses, is it possible to acknowledge the achievements of white people in the South";

As of 2009, the Abbeville Institute had a total of 64 associated scholars from various colleges and disciplines. It operates an annual summer school for graduate students and an annual scholars' conference. It focuses particularly on issues of secession, which its scholars believe is a topic excluded from mainstream academia. In 2010, it held a conference on secession and nullification.

Notable faculty include Thomas DiLorenzo and Clyde Wilson.

The Abbeville Institute has a press, an Abbeville Institute Review, and a blog.

== Books ==
- Hume's Philosophy of Common Life (1984). University of Chicago Press. ISBN 978-0-226-48714-4.
- Philosophical Melancholy and Delirium: Hume's Pathology of Philosophy (1998)
