= Northern Illinois University Press =

- Parent company: Cornell University Press
- Founded: 1965
- Country of origin: United States
- Headquarters location: DeKalb, Illinois
- Distribution: Chicago Distribution Center (the Americas, EMEA, India); United Publishers Services (Japan); Footprint Books (Australia)
- Publication types: Books
- Imprints: Switchgrass Book
- Official website: www.niupress.niu.edu

Northern Illinois University Press is a publisher affiliated with Northern Illinois University and owned by Cornell University Press. The press publishes about twenty new books per year in history, politics, anthropology, and literature, with about 400 books currently in print. In September 2008 the Press launched a fiction imprint, Switchgrass Books, which will publish fiction set in the Midwest.

== See also ==
- List of English-language book publishing companies
- List of university presses
