= Chronicles (magazine) =

US paleoconservative political magazine

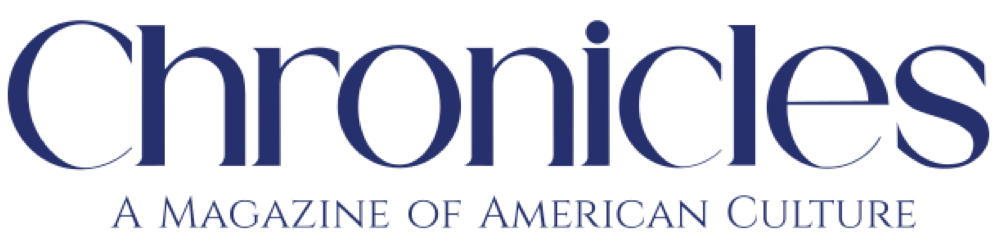

- November 2025 cover
- Editor: Paul Gottfried
- Frequency: Monthly
- Founded: 1977; 49 years ago
- Country: United States
- Website: chroniclesmagazine.org
- ISSN: 0887-5731
- OCLC: 659216853

Chronicles is a U.S. monthly magazine published by the Charlemagne Institute and associated with the paleoconservative movement. Its full current name is Chronicles: A Magazine of American Culture. It was founded in 1977 by the Rockford Institute, which later merged into a successor organization, the Charlemagne Institute. Paul Gottfried has been the editor-in-chief since 2021.

== History ==
In the first years since inception in 1977, the magazine was an anticommunist bi-monthly called Chronicles of Culture, edited by Leopold Tyrmand (1920–85), pen name of Jan Andrzej Stanislaw Kowalski, a Polish novelist and co-founder of the Rockford Institute who had previously written for The New Yorker.

In its first decade, the magazine grew to some 5,000 subscribers, according to E. Christian Kopff. The magazine became a monthly publication in 1982. In 1984, Thomas Fleming joined as managing editor.

The magazine’s political influence reached its zenith in 1992 when prominent conservative journalist and politician Patrick J. Buchanan ran for president. His failed candidacies in 1996 and 2000 paralleled Chronicles’ drop in subscribers in the 1990s from nearly 15,000 to about 6,000.

In the 2000s, the magazine ran into severe financial difficulties. According to its own account, it received a large donation of “several million dollars” by Hannelore Schwindt, a native German who had married a Texan, in her will in 2008. The executive editor at the time was Aaron D. Wolf, who died in 2019.

Srđa Trifković is a longstanding editor for foreign affairs. In 2021, Gottfried was appointed as Interim-Editor and he has stayed in this position until today.

In the spring of 2026 it made a partial merger with the Center for Renewing America.

=== Publication ===
Originally published bimonthly, it was reduced to a monthly publication in 1982.

== List of editors ==
- Leopold Tyrmand 1977–1985
- Thomas Fleming 1985–2021
- Paul Gottfried (acting) since 2021

== Contributors ==
Contributors to Chronicles have included Paul Gottfried, Taki Theodoracopulos, Srđa Trifković, Robert Weissberg, and Catharine Savage Brosman, among others.

== Impact and recognition ==
Beyond politics, Chronicles also gained recognition in the national press as a forum for cultural and intellectual debate. In 1987, columnist Anthony Harrigan referred to it as "the brilliant scholarly journal published by the highly respected Rockford Institute of Illinois."

== Reception and criticism ==
According to Edward H. Sebesta, Fleming, who had been a co-founder of Southern Partisan magazine, brought neo-Confederate views to Chronicles. By 1989 the subscription list had grown to nearly 15,000. Fleming published right-wing authors like Sam Francis, Clyde N. Wilson, Paul Gottfried, and Chilton Williamson Jr. As the Soviet Union broke up at the end of the Cold War and nationalism rose there and in Eastern Europe, some articles in Chronicles argued that the United States too would need to disintegrate by ethnicity. Political scientist Joseph Lowndes has written that Chronicles "churned out regular anti-immigrant pieces, attacking Latin American and Southeast Asian immigration on the basis of race, culture, national identity and populist defense of the white working class".

Joseph Scotchie, who has written for Chronicles, described it in 1999 as emphasizing anti-intervention in foreign policy, anti-globalism, and aversion to mass immigration. In 2000, James Warren of The Chicago Tribune called Chronicles "right-leaning" and wrote, "There are few publications more cerebral". He described a Chronicles article criticizing the finances of Donald Trump, who was then considering a Reform Party presidential campaign. Historians in the 2000s described writers associated with Chronicles as "Neo-Agrarian conservatives" revering Southern beliefs.

Chronicles has had close ties to the neo-Confederate movement. The Southern Poverty Law Center (SPLC) described Chronicles in 2017 as "a publication with strong neo-Confederate ties that caters to the more intellectual wing of the white nationalist movement", and in another article said it was "controversial even among conservatives for its racism and anti-Semitism".
