= E. Christian Kopff =

American classicist

- Born: 22 November 1946 (age 79); Brooklyn, New York
- Awards: Jacob Van Ek Mentor Award

Academic background
- Education: Haverford College

Academic work
- Era: 1973–present
- Institutions: University of Colorado Boulder
- Website: http://www.colorado.edu/honors/faculty/e-christian-kopff

E. Christian Kopff (born 22 November 1946, Brooklyn, New York) is Associate Professor of Classics and Associate Director of the Honors Program at the University of Colorado Boulder, where he has taught since 1973. He is a Fellow of the American Academy in Rome and has been awarded grants from the National Endowment for the Humanities and the CU Committee on Research. He has been a contributor to far-right publications.

== Academics ==
Kopff studied at St. Paul's School (Garden City, New York) before attending Haverford College, from which he received his undergraduate diploma summa cum laude. His doctoral degree in Classics was awarded by the University of North Carolina at Chapel Hill.

== Views ==
Kopff was described by the Southern Poverty Law Center (SPLC) in 2008 as one of the "notable academic racists" leading the H.L. Mencken Club, of which he was vice president. He has contributed to The Occidental Quarterly, described by the SPLC as a far-right race journal, and Social Contract, an anti-immigrant publication.

He has been described as a paleoconservative, and as such he has cited religious and cultural grounds for supporting capital punishment, and described modern American society as a "leftist hegemony" in a piece for a white nationalist publication encouraging "members of the American Alternative Right" to read the works of the Italian far-right philosopher Julius Evola prior to embarking on his own translation of two of Evola's works on Italian Fascism and Nazism.

== Selected publications ==
=== Author ===
- "Virgil and the cyclic epics". Aufstieg und Niedergang der römischen Welt. 2 (31 part 2). Berlin/New York: W. de Gruyter: 919–947. 1972. OCLC 844487794.
- Kopff, E. Christian (June 1989). "Understanding civilization as narrative". Academic Questions. 2 (2). Springer Verlag: 17–21. doi:10.1007/BF02682815. ISSN 0895-4852. S2CID 143446750.
- The Devil Knows Latin: Why America Needs the Classical Tradition. Intercollegiate Studies Institute. 1999. ISBN 978-1-882926251.
- "Julius Evola & Radical Traditionalism." National Policy Institute. Later reprinted as Julius Evola, an Introduction

=== Translator ===
- Euripides (1982). Bacchae (critical ed.). BSB Teubner, rpt. Coloquio. ISBN 978-8486093716.
- Pieper, Josef (June 2008) [1970]. Tradition: Concept and Claim [Überlieferung : Begriff und Anspruch]. Intercollegiate Studies Institute. ISBN 978-1-933859545.
- Evola, Julius (25 February 2013) [1974]. Fascism Viewed from the Right [Il fascismo visto dalla destra]. Arktos Media. ISBN 978-1-907166921.
- Evola, Julius (10 June 2013) [1974]. Notes on the Third Reich [Note sul terzo Reich]. Arktos Media. ISBN 978-1-907166938.
