= Catharine Savage Brosman =

American writer (born 1934)

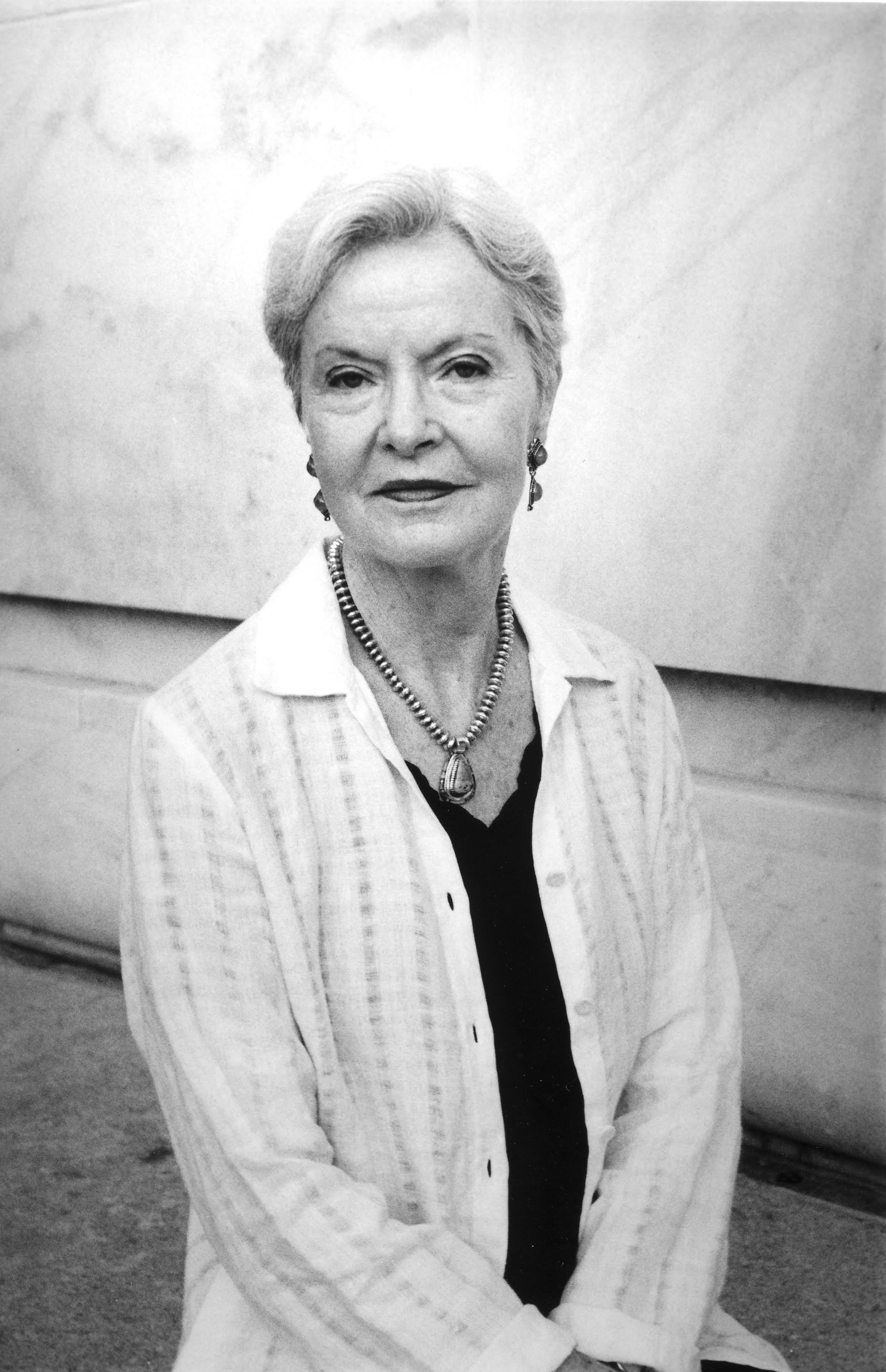
Brosman in 2003

Catharine Savage Brosman (born 1934) is an American poet, essayist, and scholar of French literature and a former professor at Tulane University, where she held the Gore Chair of French Studies.

== Life and career ==
Brosman was born in Denver; she spent her girlhood there and in Alpine, Texas. She graduated Phi Beta Kappa from Rice University (then The Rice Institute) with a B.A. in Romance languages (1955) and an M.A. in French (1957). She then studied in France as a Fulbright scholar. She took her Ph.D. in French from Rice in 1960. She taught French at Rice, Sweet Briar College, the University of Florida, and Mary Baldwin College before settling at Tulane University in 1968, where she was appointed full professor in 1972.

In 1990 Brosman was named Andrew Mellon Professor of Humanities for one term; she occupied the Gore Chair of French Studies from 1992 until her retirement as professor emerita as of 1997. She served also as visiting professor at the University of Sheffield in 1996 and was named Honorary Research Professor there.

Brosman has published numerous single-authored and edited books on French literature, including five volumes in the Dictionary of Literary Biography series. Her poems have been published by journals in the United States and in England and France (in translation). In addition to the volumes listed below, she has published four chapbooks of verse, and her poems have been reprinted in anthologies, magazines, and newspapers, including the Los Angeles Times. She has also published translations of French poets.

After living in New Orleans for nearly forty years, she moved to Houston at the end of 2007. Many of the poems in Breakwater and On the Old Plaza were inspired by Brosman's remarriage in 2008 to her first husband, Patric Savage.

== Works ==
=== Poetry ===
- Arm in Arm: Poems, Macon: Mercer University Press, 2022.
- Clara's Bees: Poems, Little Gidding Press, 2021
- Chained Tree, Chained Owls, Shotwell Publishing, 2020 ISBN 9781947660328
- A Memory of Manaus: Poems, Mercer University Press, 2017
- On the Old Plaza, Mercer University Press, 2014, ISBN 978-0-88146-514-3
- On the North Slope, Mercer University Press, 2012, ISBN 978-0-88146-273-9
- Under the Pergola, LSU Press, 2011, ISBN 978-0-8071-3880-9
- Breakwater, Mercer University Press, 2009, ISBN 978-0-88146-180-0
- Range of Light, LSU Press, 2007, ISBN 978-0-8071-3216-6
- The Muscled Truce, LSU Press, 2003, ISBN 0-8071-2889-9
- Places in Mind, LSU Press, 2000, ISBN 0-8071-2546-6
- Passages, LSU Press, 2006, ISBN 0-8071-2049-9
- Journeying from Canyon de Chelly, LSU Press, 1990, ISBN 0-8071-1626-2
- Watering, University of Georgia Press, 1972, ISBN 0-8203-0310-0
- Aerosols and Other Poems, Shotwell Publishing, 2023

=== Creative essays ===
- Finding Higher Ground: A Life of Travels, University of Nevada Press, 2003, ISBN 0-87417-538-0
- The Shimmering Maya and Other Essays, LSU Press, 1994, ISBN 0-8071-1874-5

=== Scholarly studies (selected) ===
- Louisiana Poets. A Literary Guide (with Olivia McNeely Pass), University Press of Mississippi, 2019 ISBN 978-1-4968-2212-3
- Music from the Lake and Other Essays, Chronicles Press, 2017
- Southwestern Women Writers and the Vision of Goodness: Mary Austin, Willa Cather, Laura Adams Armer, Peggy Pond Church and Alice Marriott, McFarland, 2016 ISBN 978-1-4766-6647-1
- Louisiana Creole Literature: A Historical Study, University Press of Mississippi, 2013, ISBN 978-1-61703-910-2
- Existential Fiction, Gale, 2000, ISBN 0-7876-5131-1
- Albert Camus, Gale, 2000, ISBN 0-7876-5134-6
- Visions of War in France: Fiction, Art, Ideology, LSU Press, 1999, ISBN 0-8071-2346-3
- French Culture 1900-1975, edited with an introduction, Gale, 1995, ISBN 0-8103-8482-5
- Simone de Beauvoir Revisited, Twayne, 1991, ISBN 0-8057-8269-9
- Art as Testimony: The Work of Jules Roy, University of Florida Press, 1989, ISBN 0-8130-0915-4
- Jean-Paul Sartre, Twayne, 1983, ISBN 0-8057-6590-5
- Malraux, Sartre, and Aragon as Political Novelists, University of Florida Press, 1964

=== Fiction ===
- An Aesthetic Education and Other Stories, Green Altar Books, 2019 ISBN 978-1947660212

=== Critical reception ===
Brosman’s first creative work was hailed by critics for its vision and craftsmanship, as a profile in Contemporary Authors showed. John Irwin Fischer spoke of Watering as “a community of individual verse shaped toward a vision of man which acknowledges both his uniqueness and his role in some still dark harmony.”. Another reviewer called the collection “understated, splendidly wrought.” D. E. Richardson, one of several reviewers who have mentioned Emily Dickinson in connection with Brosman, wrote that she “convinces us in the way of the old meditative landscape poetry that nature is full of human meanings which we must notice lest we fail as human souls.” Vassar Miller called the book “a delightful shock” and remarked that Brosman had “only one way to go—up.”

Subsequent assessments have been similarly favorable. Reviewing her second collection, Donald Stanford praised the form, “her own special kind of free verse—sensitive, perceptive, subtly rhythmical—quite superior to that of most practitioners of the medium.” Concerning her third book, David Slavitt noted, “She started out well and keeps getting better... Why she hasn’t been laden with honors and awards is an unfathomable mystery to me.” Gray Jacobik wrote that the New Mexico poems in that book “capture the radiance of that place better than any I have ever read that use the American Southwest for a setting.” Reviewing Places in Mind, David Middleton asserted that Brosman was still at the height of her powers and singled out for commendation the poem “Crab Cakes.” In starred reviews for Booklist, Ray Olson commended the “exceptionally well crafted” poems in The Muscled Truce and wrote that Range of Light stood “with much of Mary Austin and certain pages of Willa Cather among the finest poetry” of the American west. Olson later called Brosman “one of the most elegant contemporary poets.” In a review article, James Matthew Wilson called Breakwater "stunning," "a formidable collection," "one of the most intelligently unified, elegantly composed, and morally compelling books of poems I have read in years." In a review of On the Old Plaza for Booklist, Ray Olson wrote, "Each poem, whatever its particular excellences, affords the company of one of the most delightfully acute, witty, and capable poets now writing."

Brosman’s two volumes of creative prose have likewise been praised. Patrick Henry wrote of the “metaphysical self-consciousness” visible in The Shimmering Maya. Sue Halpern said of Brosman’s writing in the collection that “her most powerful words are her most lyrical, the ones that honor the land.” Reviewing Finding Higher Ground, Susan Meyers commended the author’s “intelligence, spirit, and vision.”

== Honors and awards ==
Brosman received several teaching awards at Rice and at Tulane; she won the Tulane Liberal Arts and Science Research Prize in 1989; and she has been given various poetry prizes. She was short-listed by the Louisiana Endowment for the Humanities peer-review process for the position of poet laureate of Louisiana in 2003 and again in 2007. She was awarded the Hugh Scott Cameron Prize by Rice in 1995 and was named a Distinguished Alumna in 2000.
