= Southern Partisan =

Neo-confederate political magazine

Southern Partisan is a neo-Confederate online magazine based in Columbia, South Carolina, United States. It is focused on the Southern region and states that were formerly members of the Confederate States of America. Founded in 1979 as Southern Partisan Quarterly Review, its first editor was Thomas Fleming. From 1999 to 2009 it was edited by Christopher Sullivan. After 2009 it ceased print publication and is now only online. It has been called "arguably the most important neo-Confederate periodical" by the Southern Poverty Law Center.

The magazine generally espouses a pro-southern perspective on political issues and the American Civil War. The magazine features commentary on southern culture, history, literature, the Southern Agrarians, the Civil War and Confederacy, and current political issues. Its news section "CSA Today" covers stories from each of the eleven former Confederate states, as well as Missouri and Kentucky, which the Confederate States claimed to have admitted.

The magazine is harshly critical of what it describes as "politically correct" policy-making, such as the removal of Confederate historical monuments. It also gives out a "Scalawag Award" in each issue to Southerners who act contrary to the magazine's editorial position.

Reviews of books about the southern United States appear in each issue, as do general political opinion pieces from conservative and libertarian perspectives. The magazine has carried columns by syndicated opinion commentators including Walter Williams, William Murchison, Joseph Sobran, and Charley Reese.

== Views and reception ==
The SPLC dates the earliest contemporary usage of the term "neo-Confederate" to a 1988 Southern Partisan article.

The New York Times in 2000 described Southern Partisan as "one of the (southern) region's most right-wing magazines," noting its disapproval of Abraham Lincoln and the Union during the Civil War, and tendency to "venerate the rebel soldiers who fought to secede from the United States." It also noted that the magazine features "high-minded historical reviews in the tradition of the Southern agrarian movement, which glorified the South's slow-paced traditions of farms and small towns."

Ed Sebesta has written that Southern Partisan and Chronicles are the "major publications" of the Confederate movement. Slate described Southern Partisan as a "crypto-racist, pro-Confederate magazine." In 2000, the president of the progressive advocacy group People for the American Way called Southern Partisan "racist", pointing to columns that criticize Martin Luther King Jr. and Nelson Mandela, and alleged that it views slavery favorably. The Times report noted a Southern Partisan article describing white slave traders as being better to slaves than African warlords. According to the Times report, Southern Partisan "takes the position that the Civil War was fought not over slavery, but over the preservation of a Southern way of life that to this day is worth preserving."

Southern Partisan received national attention in 2001 during the confirmation hearings of U.S. Attorney General John Ashcroft, who had praised Robert E. Lee in a 1998 interview with the magazine.

The magazine's editor Christopher Sullivan has said that critics take "quotes out of context to paint a picture of racial and historical bigotry in the Partisan". Sullivan pointed out that the magazine publishes articles by African-American writers such as Walter E. Williams.
