= Sam Francis (writer) =

American columnist and writer (1947–2005)

- Born: Samuel Todd Francis; April 29, 1947; Chattanooga, Tennessee, U.S.
- Died: February 15, 2005 (aged 57); Cheverly, Maryland, U.S.
- Resting place: Forest Hills Cemetery, Chattanooga, Tennessee, U.S.
- Education: Johns Hopkins University (BA); University of North Carolina at Chapel Hill (PhD)
- Occupations: Columnist; writer

Samuel Todd Francis (April 29, 1947 – February 15, 2005) was an American writer and academic. He was a columnist and editor for the conservative Washington Times until he was dismissed in 1995 after making racist remarks at the American Renaissance conference a year earlier. Francis would later become a "dominant force" on the Council of Conservative Citizens, a white supremacist organization identified as a hate group by the Southern Poverty Law Center (SPLC). Francis was the chief editor of the council's newsletter, Citizens Informer, until his death in 2005. The white supremacist Jared Taylor called Francis "the premier philosopher of white racial consciousness of our time".

The political scientist and writer George Michael, an expert on extremism, identified Francis as one of "the far right's higher-caliber intellectuals." The SPLC described Francis as an important white nationalist writer known for the "ubiquitous presence of his columns in racist forums and his influence over the general direction of right-wing extremism" in the United States. The journalist Leonard Zeskind called Francis the "philosopher king" of the radical right, writing that, "By any measure, Francis's white nationalism was as subtle as an eight-pound hammer pounding on a twelve inch I beam." The political analyst Chip Berlet described Francis as an ultraconservative ideologue akin to Pat Buchanan, whom Francis advised. The anarcho-capitalist political theorist Hans-Hermann Hoppe called Francis "one of the leading theoreticians and strategists of the Buchananite movement."

== Early life ==
Francis was born in Chattanooga, Tennessee. He received a bachelor's degree from Johns Hopkins University in 1969, and a master's degree in 1971 and doctorate in 1979 from the University of North Carolina at Chapel Hill.

== Career ==
=== The Washington Times ===
Francis was a policy analyst at the Heritage Foundation and an aide to the U.S. senator John P. East before joining the editorial staff of The Washington Times in 1986. Five years later, he became a columnist for the newspaper, and his column became syndicated.

In addition to his journalistic career, Francis was an adjunct scholar at the Ludwig von Mises Institute of Auburn, Alabama.

In June 1995, editor-in-chief Wesley Pruden "had cut back on Francis' column" after The Washington Times ran his essay criticizing the Southern Baptist Convention for its approval of a resolution that apologized for slavery. In the piece, Francis asserted that, "The contrition of the Southern Baptists for slavery and racism is a bit more than a politically fashionable gesture intended to massage race relations" and that "Neither slavery nor racism as an institution is a sin."

In September 1995, Pruden fired Francis from The Washington Times after the conservative journalist Dinesh D'Souza, in a column in The Washington Post, described Francis's appearance at the 1994 American Renaissance conference: "A lively controversialist, Francis began with some largely valid complaints about how the Southern heritage is demonized in mainstream culture. He went on, however, to attack the liberal principles of humanism and universalism for facilitating 'the war against the white race.' At one point he described country music megastar Garth Brooks as 'repulsive' because 'he has that stupid universalist song (We Shall Be Free), in which we all intermarry.' His fellow whites, he insisted, must 'reassert our identity and our solidarity, and we must do so in explicitly racial terms through the articulation of a racial consciousness as whites… The civilization that we as whites created in Europe and America could not have developed apart from the genetic endowments of the creating people, nor is there any reason to believe that the civilization can be successfully transmitted to a different people.'"

After D'Souza's column was published, Pruden "decided he did not want the Times associated with such views after looking into other Francis writings, in which he advocated the possible deportation of legal immigrants and forced birth control for welfare mothers."

Francis said soon after the firing that "I believe there are racial differences, there are natural differences between the races. I don't believe that one race is better than another. There's reasonably solid evidence for IQ differences, personality and behavior differences. I understand those things have been taken to justify segregation and white supremacy. That is not my intent."

=== Later career ===
After being fired from The Washington Times, Francis continued to write a column, which was syndicated through Creators Syndicate at least as early as January 2000.

Francis became a "dominant force" on the Council of Conservative Citizens. Francis was the chief editor of the council's quarterly newsletter, Citizens Informer, until his death in 2005. Francis wrote the council's Statement of Principles, which "called for America to be a Christian nation" and "oppose[d] all efforts to mix the races of mankind." In his writings, Francis advocated for a moratorium on all immigration, plus an indefinite suspension of all immigration by non-Europeans and non-Westerners.

Francis was also an editor of The Occidental Quarterly, a white nationalist journal edited by Kevin Lamb and sponsored by William Regnery II.

He served as a contributor and editor of the Intercollegiate Studies Institute's quarterly, Modern Age. After his dismissal from The Washington Times and the Pittsburgh Tribune-Review, Francis continued to write a syndicated column for VDARE and Chronicles magazine, and spoke at meetings of American Renaissance and the Council of Conservative Citizens. He attended the American Friends of the British National Party's meeting on April 22, 2000, where he heard and met Nick Griffin, then the leader of the fascist British National Party and a future member of the European Parliament. His articles also appeared in Middle American News. Francis' last published work was an article penned for the 2005 IHS Press anti-war anthology, Neo-Conned!.

Francis died on February 15, 2005, at Prince George's Hospital Center in Cheverly, Maryland, following an unsuccessful surgery to treat an aortic aneurysm. He was 57. Francis was buried at the foot of Lookout Mountain.

== Thought and legacy ==
Francis's term "anarcho-tyranny" refers to armed dictatorship without rule of law, or a Hegelian synthesis when the state tyrannically or oppressively regulates citizens' lives yet is unable or unwilling to enforce fundamental protective law. Commentators have invoked the term in reference to situations when governments focus on weapon confiscation instead of stopping looters. On Francis's death, the Rockford Institute magazine Chronicles dedicated its April 2005 issue to his memory and the concept. Francis had a significant influence on the paleoconservative movement.

Francis argued that the conservative movement was made of "beautiful losers", being either "rootless men" attracted to archaic things or crypto-liberals who sometimes resist progressive change before eventually caving in. He argued that the political right kept losing because it was too focused on ideas and less on power. According to Francis, the political left has dominated politics due to the ascendancy of a progressive managerial class, leading to more bureaucratization and more state power while eroding the power of other authorities in society. To combat the emergence of this new class, Francis argued that the political right needed a base for its goals, this base being the white middle class or "Middle American radicals." In order to capture this base for the political right, Francis argued in favor of emphasizing "crime, educational collapse, the erosion of their economic status, and the calculated subversion of their social, cultural, and national identity" to create a class identity for this group.

Writing in The Week, the commentator Michael Brendan Dougherty wrote that Francis's writings, and his rejection of movement conservatism, presaged Donald Trump's victory in the 2016 U.S. presidential election. In September 2017, the New York Times columnist David Brooks wrote: "The only time I saw Sam Francis face-to-face — in The Washington Times cafeteria sometime in the late 1980s or early 1990s — I thought he was a crank, but it's clear now that he was at that moment becoming one of the most prescient writers of the past 50 years. There's very little Donald Trump has done or said that Francis didn't champion a quarter century ago." In 2023, the historian Joshua Tait said that "Before a Trump-inspired resurgence in interest in Francis, he was a cautionary tale from conservative intellectual history."

During the 2022 U.S. elections, the Republican Party candidates Blake Masters and Joe Kent promoted Francis's writings.

Although Francis sometimes engaged with Christian thinkers and publications during his life, he was also harshly critical of Christianity in his later years and his worldview has been described as irreligious and materialistic. Francis wrote that "Christianity today is the enemy of the West and the race that created it" and suggested that the "religious wrong" operated under a "false consciousness" that prevented white Christians from recognizing their true interests. Because of this, he has been cited as part of a trend toward increasingly "secular, even pagan" ideas among certain segments of the American radical right.

According to Father Paul Scalia (son of Antonin Scalia), Francis died a Roman Catholic.

== Works ==
- (1984) Power and History: The Political Thought of James Burnham. University Press of America ISBN 0-8191-3753-7
- (1994) Beautiful Losers: Essays on the Failure of American Conservatism. University of Missouri Press ISBN 0-8262-0976-9
- (1996) "From Household to Nation." Chronicles, March 1996, pp. 12–16.
- (1997) Revolution From the Middle. Middle America Press ISBN 1-887898-01-8
- (1997) "Classical Republicanism and the Right to Bear Arms," in Costs of War. Transaction Publishers, pp. 53–66 ISBN 0-7658-0487-5
- (1999) James Burnham: Thinkers of Our Time. London: Claridge Press ISBN 1-870626-32-X
- (2001) America Extinguished: Mass Immigration and the Disintegration of American Culture. Americans for Immigration Control Publishers OCLC 52154966
- (2003) Ethnopolitics: Immigration, Race, and the American Political Future. Representative Government Press ISBN 0-9672154-1-2
- (2005) "Refuge of Scoundrels: Patriotism, True and False, in the Iraq Controversy," in Neo-Conned! IHS Press, pp. 151–60 ISBN 978-1932528060
- (2006) Shots Fired: Sam Francis on America's Culture War. FGF Books edited by Peter Gemma ISBN 0-9777362-0-2
- (2007) Essential Writings on Race. New Century Foundation ISBN 978-0-9656383-7-1
- (2016) Leviathan and Its Enemies. Washington Summit Publishers ISBN 978-1-59368049-7
