= Paleoconservatism =

Political philosophy

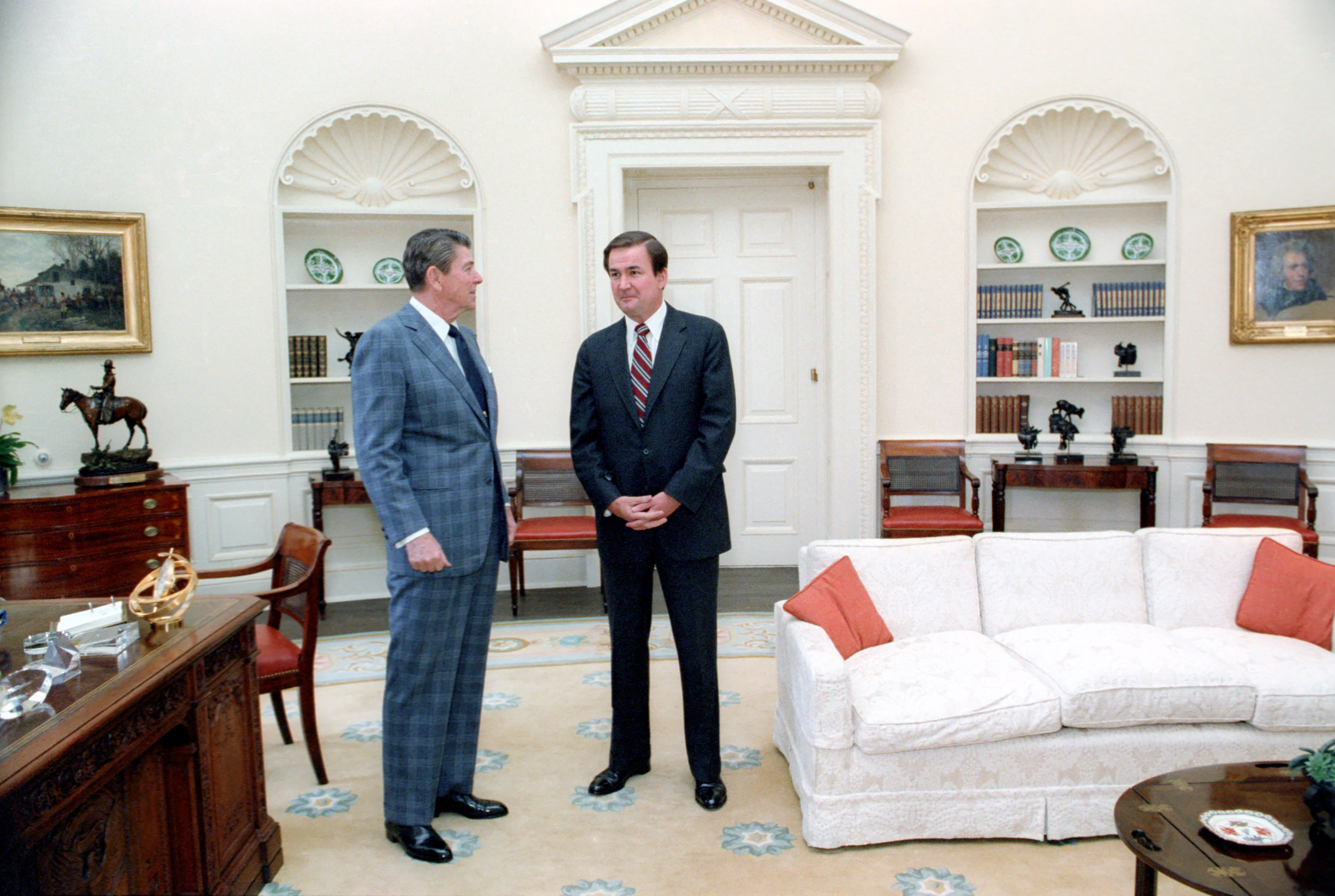
President Ronald Reagan with White House Communications Director Pat Buchanan, one of the pioneers of 21st century paleoconservatism

Paleoconservatism is a strain of conservatism in the United States that stresses American nationalism, Christian ethics, traditionalist conservatism, localism and non-interventionism. Paleoconservatism's concerns overlap with those of the Old Right (which opposed the New Deal in the 1930s and 1940s) as well as with paleolibertarianism. Paleoconservatives press for restrictions on immigration, a rollback of multicultural programs and large-scale demographic change, the decentralization of federal policy, the restoration of controls upon free trade, a greater emphasis upon economic nationalism, and non-intervention in the politics of foreign nations.

== Etymology ==
The prefix paleo derives from the Greek root παλαιός (palaiós), meaning "ancient" or "old", in reference to the paleoconservatives' claim to represent a more historic, authentic conservative tradition than that found in neoconservatism. Adherents of paleoconservatism often describe themselves simply as "paleo". Rich Lowry of National Review claims the prefix "is designed to obscure the fact that it is a recent ideological creation of post-Cold War politics".

Samuel T. Francis, Thomas Fleming, and some other paleoconservatives deemphasize the conservative part of the paleoconservative label, claiming they do not want the status quo preserved. Fleming and Paul Gottfried called such thinking "stupid tenacity" and described it as "a series of trenches dug in defense of last year's revolution". Francis defined authentic conservatism as "the survival and enhancement of a particular people and its institutionalized cultural expressions".

== History of the term ==
The term paleoconservative was coined by Paul Gottfried in the 1980s to refer to American conservatives who had opposed the Vietnam War, in contrast to neoconservatives who had supported the war. Gottfried argues that William F. Buckley Jr.'s intense support for the Vietnam War was the true reason why he ousted non-interventionist conservatives like the John Birch Society from National Review, and that neoconservatives only retroactively accused these non-interventionists of holding racist and antisemitic views that justified their ousting.

In the 21st century, the term paleoconservative came to be associated with conservatives who criticize Israel and support the Arab cause in the Israeli–Palestinian conflict. However, the Israeli–Palestinian conflict was originally tangential to the neoconservative–paleoconservative split, and paleoconservatives to this day have varied opinions on the matter. Some, such as Pat Buchanan, Russell Kirk, and Tucker Carlson have tended to criticize Israel, whereas others (including Gottfried himself) have expressed pro-Israel stances. Gottfried, who is Jewish, in particular views the rise in anti-Zionism following the October 7 attacks as part of a broader movement of anti-white sentiment in Western countries.

== Ideology ==
Paleoconservatives support restrictions on immigration, decentralization, trade tariffs and protectionism, economic nationalism, isolationism, and a return to traditional conservative ideals relating to gender, race, sexuality, culture, and society.

Paleoconservatism differs from neoconservatism in opposing free trade and promoting republicanism. Paleoconservatives see neoconservatives as imperialists and themselves as defenders of the republic.

Paleoconservatives tend to oppose abortion, gay marriage, and LGBTQ rights.

By the start of the 21st century, the movement had begun to focus more on issues of race.

=== Human nature, tradition, and reason ===
Paleoconservatives believe tradition is a form of reason, rather than a competing force. Mel Bradford wrote that certain questions are settled before serious deliberation concerning a preferred course of conduct begins. This ethic is based on a "culture of families, linked by friendship, common enemies, and common projects", so a good conservative keeps "a clear sense of what Southern grandmothers have always meant in admonishing children, 'we don't do that'".

Pat Buchanan argues that a good politician must "defend the moral order rooted in the Old and New Testament and Natural Law"—and that "the deepest problems in our society are not economic or political, but moral".

=== Southern traditionalism ===
According to historian Paul V. Murphy, paleoconservatives developed a focus on localism and states' rights. From the mid-1980s onward, Chronicles promoted a Southern traditionalist worldview focused on national identity, regional particularity, and skepticism of abstract theory and centralized power. According to Hague, Beirich, and Sebesta (2009), the anti-modernism of the paleoconservative movement defined the neo-Confederate movement of the 1980s and 1990s. During this time, notable paleoconservatives argued that desegregation, welfare, tolerance of gay rights, and church-state separation had been damaging to local communities, and that these issues had been imposed by federal legislation and think tanks. Paleoconservatives also claimed the Southern Agrarians, an early 20th century group of poets and writers famous for the literary manifesto I'll Take My Stand, as forebears in this regard.

== Notable people ==
=== Philosophers and scholars ===
- Russell Kirk (1918–1994)
- Mel Bradford (1934–1993)
- Paul Gottfried (born 1941)
- Clyde N. Wilson (born 1941)
- E. Christian Kopff (born 1946)
- William S. Lind (born 1947)
- Curtis Yarvin (born 1973)

=== Commentators and columnists ===
- Robert Novak (1931–2009)
- Taki Theodoracopulos (born 1936)
- Pat Buchanan (born 1938), White House Communications Director (1985–1987), 1992 and 1996 Republican presidential candidate, 2000 Reform Party presidential nominee
- John Derbyshire (born 1945)
- Thomas Fleming (born 1945)
- Joseph Sobran (1946–2010)
- Peter Brimelow (born 1947)
- Samuel T. Francis (1947–2005)
- Steve Sailer (born 1958)
- Tucker Carlson (born 1969)
- Mark Dice (born 1977)

=== Donald Trump ===
Historian George Hawley states that, although influenced by paleoconservatism, Donald Trump is not a paleoconservative, but rather a nationalist and a right-wing populist. Hawley also argued in 2017 that paleoconservatism was an exhausted force in American politics, but that, for a time, it represented the most serious right-wing threat to the mainstream movement conservatism. Regardless of how Trump himself is categorized, others regard the movement known as Trumpism as supported by, if not a rebranding of, paleoconservatism. From this view, the followers of the Old Right did not fade away so easily and continue to have significant influence in the Republican Party and the entire country.

== Notable organizations and outlets ==
=== Organizations ===
- Abbeville Institute
- John Birch Society

=== Periodicals and websites ===
- The American Conservative
- Chronicles (magazine)
- Observer & Review
- Intercollegiate Review
- Taki's Magazine

== See also ==
- Alt-right
- Alt-lite
- American nationalism
- Anti-globalization movement
- Criticism of multiculturalism
- Cultural conservatism
- Fusionism
- Liberal conservatism
- Libertarian conservatism
- National conservatism
- National liberalism
- Neoconservatism
- Old Left
- Old Right (United States)
- Paleolibertarianism
- Radical right (United States)
- Reactionary
- Right-libertarianism
- Right-wing populism
- Social conservatism in the United States
- Traditionalist conservatism in the United States
- Groypers or "neo-paleoconservatism"
