= Neo-Confederates =

Modern American political grouping

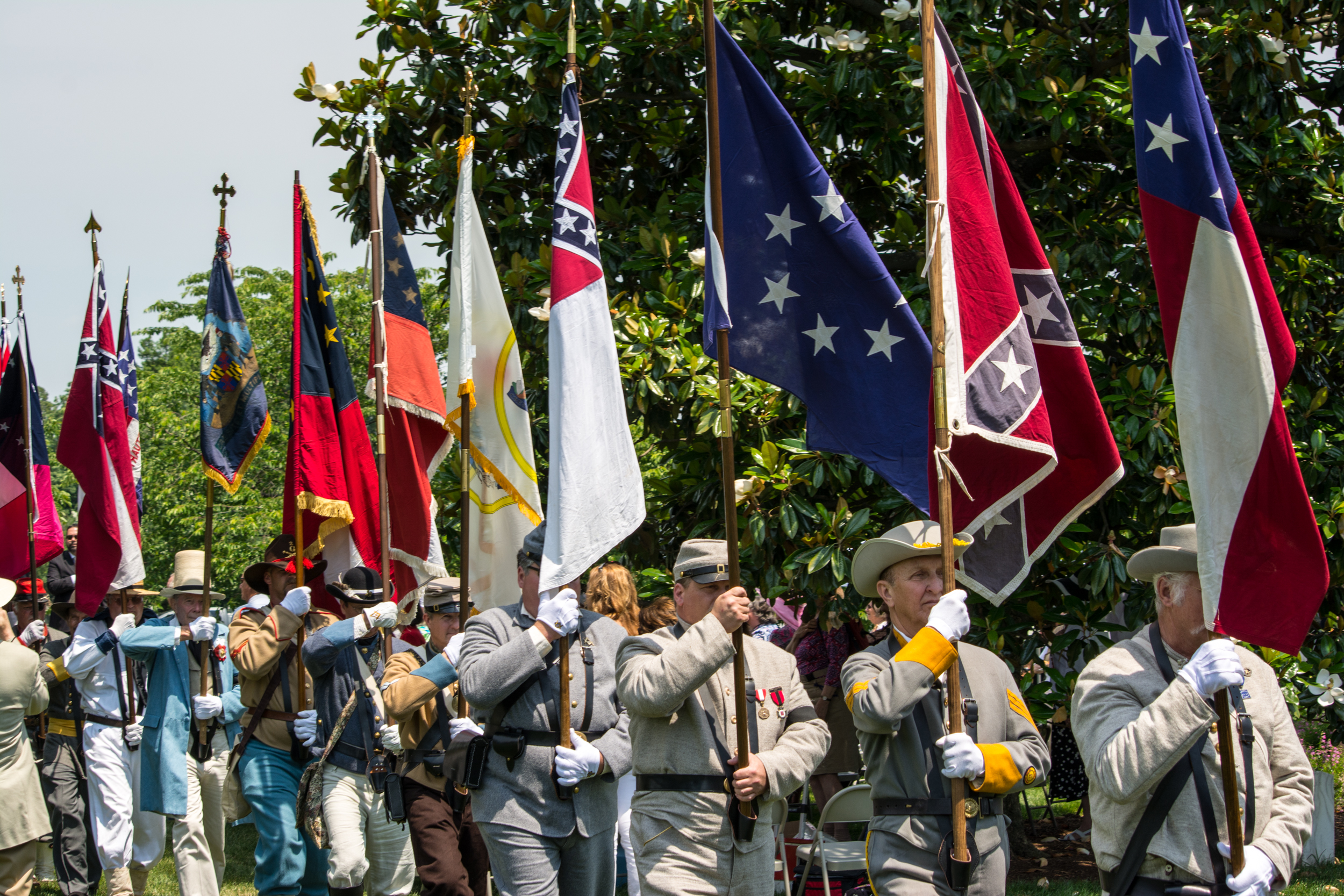
Maryland Sons of Confederate Veterans marching in Arlington National Cemetery in 2014

Neo-Confederates are groups and individuals who portray the Confederate States of America and its actions during the American Civil War in a positive light. The League of the South (formed in 1994), the United Daughters of the Confederacy (formed in 1894), the Sons of Confederate Veterans (formed in 1896), and other neo-Confederate organizations continue to defend the secession of the 11 Confederate States.

== Etymology ==
A rectangular variant of the Confederate battle flag, also known colloquially as the Southern Cross

The first national flag of the Confederate States with 13 stars, used from November 28, 1861, to May 1, 1863, and colloquially known as the Stars and Bars

The second national flag of the Confederate states, used from May 1, 1863, to March 4, 1865, and colloquially known as the Stainless Banner

The third national flag adopted on March 4, 1865, shortly before the end of the American Civil War and also known colloquially as the Bloodstained Banner

Historian James M. McPherson used the term "neo-Confederate historical committees" in his description of the efforts which were undertaken from 1890 to 1930 to have history textbooks present a version of the American Civil War in which secession was not rebellion, the Confederacy did not fight for slavery, and the Confederate soldier was defeated by overwhelming numbers and resources. Historian Nancy MacLean used the term "neo-Confederacy" in reference to groups, such as the Mississippi State Sovereignty Commission, that formed in the 1950s to oppose the Supreme Court of the United States rulings demanding racial integration, in particular Brown v. Board of Education (1954). Former Southern Partisan editor and co-owner Richard Quinn used the term when he referred to Richard T. Hines, a former Southern Partisan contributor and Ronald Reagan administration staffer, as being "among the first neo-Confederates to resist efforts by the infidels to take down the Confederate flag."

An early use of the term came in 1954. In a book review, Leonard W. Levy (later a winner of the Pulitzer Prize for History in 1968) wrote: "Similar blindness to the moral issue of slavery, plus a resentment against the rise of the Negro and modern industrialism, resulted in the neo-Confederate interpretation of Phillips, Ramsdell and Owsley."

Historian Gary W. Gallagher stated in an interview that neo-Confederates do not want to hear him when he talks "about how important maintaining racial control, white supremacy, was to the white South." He warns, however, that the term neo-Confederate can be overused, writing, "Any historian who argues that the Confederate people demonstrated robust devotion to their slave-based republic, possessed feelings of national community, and sacrificed more than any other segment of white society in United States history runs the risk of being labeled a neo-Confederate."

== History ==
=== Origins of the "Lost Cause" movement ===
The "Lost Cause" is the name which is commonly given to a movement that seeks to reconcile the existence of the traditional society of the Southern United States with the defeat of the Confederate States of America (CSA) at the end of the American Civil War of 1861–1865. Those who contribute to the movement tend to portray the Confederacy's cause as noble and they also tend to portray most of the Confederacy's leaders as exemplars of old-fashioned chivalry who were defeated by the Union's armies because the Union's armies used overwhelming force rather than superior military skills. They believe that the history of the Civil War which is commonly portrayed is a "false history". They also tend to condemn Reconstruction, the era when African Americans were first allowed to vote.

On its main website, the Sons of Confederate Veterans (SCV) speaks of "ensuring that a true history of the 1861–1865 period is preserved", claiming that "[t]he preservation of liberty and freedom was the motivating factor in the South's decision to fight the Second American Revolution."

James M. McPherson has written the following about the origins in 1894 of the United Daughters of the Confederacy (UDC): "A principal motive of the UDC's founding was to counter this 'false history' which taught Southern children 'that their fathers were not only rebels but guilty of almost every crime enumerated in the Decalogue.'" Much of what the UDC called "false history" centered on the relationship between slavery and secession and the war. The chaplain of the United Confederate Veterans (UCV), forerunner of the Sons of Confederate Veterans, wrote in 1898 that history books as written could lead Southern children to "think that we fought for slavery" and would "fasten upon the South the stigma of slavery and that we fought for it ... The Southern soldier will go down in history dishonored". Referring to a 1932 call by the Sons of Confederate Veterans to restore "the purity of our history", McPherson notes that the "quest for purity remains vital today, as any historian working in the field can testify."

=== 20th century ===
In the 1910s, Mildred Rutherford, the historian general of the UDC, spearheaded the attack on schoolbooks that did not present the Lost Cause version of history. Rutherford assembled a "massive collection" which included "essay contests on the glory of the Ku Klux Klan and personal tributes to faithful slaves". Historian David Blight concluded: "All UDC members and leaders were not as virulently racist as Rutherford, but all, in the name of a reconciled nation, participated in an enterprise that deeply influenced the white supremacist vision of Civil war memory."

In the 1930s, Seward Collins, a self-described "fascist publisher", provided an avenue for white supremacists and neo-Confederates to advance their ideology in The American Review, a literary journal openly sympathetic to European fascism. The connections and overlap between white supremacist, fascist, far-right, and neo-Confederate ideologies persisted, and remain in place in the present day.

Historian Alan T. Nolan refers to the Lost Cause as "a rationalization, a cover-up". After describing the devastation that was the consequence of the war for the South, Nolan states:

Leaders of such a catastrophe must account for themselves. Justification is necessary. Those who followed their leaders into the catastrophe required similar rationalization. Clement A. Evans, a Georgia veteran who at one time commanded the United Confederate Veterans organization, said this: "If we cannot justify the South in the act of Secession, we will go down in History solely as a brave, impulsive but rash people who attempted in an illegal manner to overthrow the Union of our Country."

Nolan further states his opinion of the racial basis of Lost Cause mythology:

The Lost Cause version of the war is a caricature, possible, among other reasons, because of the false treatment of slavery and the black people. This false treatment struck at the core of the truth of the war, unhinging cause and effect, depriving the United States of any high purpose, and removing African Americans from their true role as the issue of the war and participants in the war, and characterizing them as historically irrelevant.

In the 1930s and 1940s, supporters of Nazi Germany sought cross appeal with American neo-confederates. Despite a shared commitment to white supremacy and antipathy towards American Liberalism, the Nazis found few sympathizers amongst white southerners, even the KKK itself. Starting in the 1970s, neo-confederate ideals and organizations became increasingly associated with the emerging neo-Nazi movement. Critics often associate Neo-Confederates with fascism in the United States.

=== Contemporary evaluations ===
Historian David Goldfield observes:

If history has defined the South, it has also trapped white southerners into sometimes defending the indefensible, holding onto views generally discredited in the rest of the civilized world and holding on the fiercer because of that. The extreme sensitivity of some Southerners toward criticism of their past (or present) reflects not only their deep attachment to their perception of history but also to their misgivings, a feeling that maybe they've fouled up somewhere and maybe the critics have something.

When asked about purported "neo-Confederate revisionism" and the people behind it, Arizona State University professor and Civil War historian Brooks D. Simpson said:

This is an active attempt to reshape historical memory, an effort by white Southerners to find historical justifications for present-day actions. The neo-Confederate movement's ideologues have grasped that if they control how people remember the past, they'll control how people approach the present and the future. Ultimately, this is a very conscious war for memory and heritage. It's a quest for legitimacy, the eternal quest for justification.

The Southern Poverty Law Center documented fourteen active Neo-Confederate groups in 2022 then only four groups two years later. The organization attributed this decline to the decreasing relevance, reach, and financial viability of Neo-Confederate groups after the 2017 Charlottesville rally weakened their attendance and caused a civil lawsuit to be brought against group leaders by Integrity First for America.

== Tenets and core beliefs ==
=== Historical revisionism ===
Neo-Confederates often hold iconoclastic views about the American Civil War and the Confederate States of America. Neo-Confederates are openly critical of the presidency of Abraham Lincoln to varying degrees and they are also critical of the history of Reconstruction. Various authors have written critiques of Lincoln and the Union. Major General William Tecumseh Sherman's March to the Sea is singled out for purported atrocities like the burning of Atlanta which neo-Confederates believe were committed against Southern civilians, in contrast to the mainstream historical perspective which argues that Sherman targeted Southern infrastructure and curtailed killing rather than expand it. Slavery is rarely mentioned—when it is, it is usually not defended and is denied as a primary cause of the Confederacy's starting of the American Civil War. Critics often accuse neo-Confederates of engaging in "historical revisionism" and acting as "apologists".

Neo-Confederates have been accused of downplaying the role of slavery in triggering the Civil War and misrepresenting African-American support for the Confederacy. The book The Confederate and Neo-Confederate Reader says that toward the end of the 20th century—in order to support the idea that the Civil War was not about slavery—neo-Confederates began to claim that "thousands of African Americans had served in the Confederate army". A neo-Confederate publication, Confederate Veteran, published by the Sons of Confederate Veterans and the Military Order of the Stars and Bars, said in 1992 that "the overwhelming majority of blacks during the War Between the States supported and defended, with armed resistance, the Cause of Southern Independence". Historian Bruce Levine says that "their [neo-Confederates'] insistent celebration these days of 'Black Confederates' ... seeks to legitimize the claim" that the war "had never [italics in original] been fought on behalf of slavery; loyalty to the South, Southern self-government, Southern culture, or states' rights — rather than slavery and white supremacy — fueled the Southern war effort".

The honor of the Confederacy and its veterans is another controversial feature of neo-Confederate dogma. The neo-Confederate movement is concerned about giving honor to the Confederacy itself, to the veterans of the Confederacy and Confederate veterans' cemeteries, to the various flags of the Confederacy and Southern cultural identity.

=== Political beliefs ===
Political values held by neo-Confederates vary, but they often revolve around a belief in limited government, states' rights, the right of states to secede, and Southern nationalism—that is, the belief that the people of the Southern United States are part of a distinct and unique civilization.

Neo-Confederates typically support a decentralized national government and are strong advocates of states' rights. Neo-Confederates are strongly in favor of the right of secession, claiming it is legal and thus openly advocate the secession of the Southern states and territories which comprised the old Confederate States of America. The League of the South, for example, promotes the "independence of the Southern people" from the "American empire". Most neo-Confederate groups do not seek violent revolution, but rather an orderly separation, such as was done in the dissolution of Czechoslovakia. Many neo-Confederate groups have prepared for what they view as a possible collapse of the federal United States into its 50 separate states, similarly to the dissolution of the Soviet Union, and believe the Confederacy can be resurrected at that time.

From the 1950s onward, the growth of neo-Confederate ideology was part of a larger reactionary movement against desegregation and the civil rights movement. Historian Nancy MacLean states that neo-Confederates used the history of the Confederacy to justify their opposition to the civil rights movement in the 1950s and 1960s. Historian David Blight writes that current neo-Confederates are "driven largely by the desire of current white supremacists to re-legitimize the Confederacy, while they tacitly reject the victories of the modern civil rights movement".

=== Cultural and religious ===
Neo-Confederates promote foundational Christian culture. They support public displays of Christianity, such as Ten Commandments monuments and displays of the Christian cross. Some neo-Confederates view the Civil War struggles as being between Christian orthodoxy and anti-Christian forces.

=== Economic policies ===
Neo-Confederates usually advocate a free market economy which engages in significantly less taxation than currently found in the United States and which does not revolve around fiat currencies such as the United States dollar. Some of them desire an extreme type of laissez-faire economic system involving a minimal role for the state. Other Neo-Confederates believe in distributionism as well as a display of populist tendencies since the Civil War. Figures such as Absolom West, Leonidas L. Polk, and William M. Lowe went on to join the Populist movements of their respective times. There is a minority of neo-Confederates who believe the Confederacy to have been socialist, citing the writings of George Fitzhugh; this was also displayed in Louise Biles Hill's book, State Socialism in the Confederate States. Many who believe this also point to Albert Parsons as another example.

== Neo-Confederates and libertarianism ==
Historian Daniel Feller asserts that libertarian authors Thomas DiLorenzo, Charles Adams and Jeffrey Rogers Hummel have produced a "marriage of neo-Confederates and libertarianism". Feller writes:

What unites the two, aside from their hostility to the liberal academic establishment, is their mutual loathing of big government. Adams, DiLorenzo, and Hummel view the Civil War through the prism of market economics. In their view its main consequence, and even its purpose, was to create a leviathan state that used its powers to suppress the most basic personal freedom, the right to choose. The Civil War thus marks a historic retreat for liberty, not an advance. Adams and DiLorenzo dismiss the slavery issue as a mere pretext for aggrandizing central power. All three authors see federal tyranny as the war's greatest legacy. And they all hate Abraham Lincoln.

In a review of libertarian Thomas E. Woods Jr.'s The Politically Incorrect Guide to American History, in turn Hummel refers to the works by DiLorenzo and Adams as "amateurish neo-Confederate books". Of Woods, Hummel states that the two main neo-Confederate aspects of Woods' work are his emphasis on a legal right of secession while ignoring the moral right to secession and his failure to acknowledge the importance of slavery in the Civil War. Hummel writes:

Woods writes 'that the slavery debate masked the real issue: the struggle over power and domination' (p. 48). Talk about a distinction without a difference. It is akin to stating that the demands of sugar lobbyists for protective quotas mask their real worry: political influence. Yes, slaveholders constituted a special interest that sought political power. Why? To protect slavery.

Hummel also criticizes Woods' "neo-Confederate sympathies" in his chapter on Reconstruction. Most egregious was his "apologia for the Black Codes adopted by the southern states immediately after the Civil War". Part of the problem was Woods' reliance on an earlier neo-Confederate work, Robert Selph Henry's 1938 book The Story of Reconstruction.

Historian Gerald J. Prokopowicz mentioned apprehension toward recognizing Lincoln's role in freeing slaves as well as libertarian attitudes towards the Confederacy in an interview regarding his book Did Lincoln Own Slaves? And Other Frequently Asked Questions about Abraham Lincoln:

Some critics look at his careful and politically practical approach to ending slavery and mistake it for reluctance to help African-Americans. Others overlook slavery altogether and romanticize the Confederacy as a libertarian paradise crushed by the tyrant Lincoln. But since even Lincoln's most extreme opponents can't deny that the end of slavery was a good thing, they have to try to disassociate Lincoln from emancipation, and that leads to the absurdity of implying that Lincoln must have been a slave owner.

Some intellectuals who have helped shape the modern neo-Confederate movement have been associated with libertarian organizations such as the Mises Institute. These individuals often insist on the South's right to secede and typically hold views in stark contrast to mainstream academia in regards to the causes and consequences of the American Civil War. Zack Beauchamp of ThinkProgress argues that because of its small size, the libertarian movement has become partially beholden to a neo-Confederate demographic. In contemporary politics, some libertarians have tried to distance themselves from neo-Confederate ideology while also critiquing President Lincoln's wartime policies, such as the suspension of habeas corpus, from a libertarian perspective.

== Neo-Confederate views and the Republican Party ==
Historian Nancy MacLean writes that "since the 1960s the party of Lincoln has become the haven of neo-Confederacy. Having long prided itself on saving the Union, the Republican Party has become home to those who lionize the slaveholding South and romanticize the Jim Crow South". According to MacClean, this embrace of neo-Confederate views is not exclusively about race, but it is related to a pragmatic political realization that the "retrospective romanticization of the Old South" and secession presented many possible themes that could be used as conservatives attempted to reverse the national changes initiated by the New Deal.

According to MacLean, after the defeat of Barry Goldwater in the 1964 presidential election and the successes of the civil rights movement, conservative leaders nationally distanced themselves from racial issues, but they continued to support a "color-blind" version of neo-Confederatism. She writes that "even into the twenty-first century mainstream conservative Republican politicians continued to associate themselves with issues, symbols, and organizations inspired by the neo-Confederate Right".

Two prominent neo-Confederates—Walter Donald Kennedy and Al Benson—published the book Red Republicans and Lincoln's Marxists: Marxism in the Civil War, in which they argue that Lincoln and the Republican Party were influenced by Marxism.

== Criticism ==
George Ewert, director of the Museum of Mobile, wrote a review of the film Gods and Generals in which he pointed out that the film was "part of a growing movement that seeks to rewrite the history of the American South, downplaying slavery and the economic system that it sustained". His review enraged local neo-Confederate activists.

== Neo-Confederate groups ==
- Abbeville Institute
- Council of Conservative Citizens
- Dixiecrats (States' Rights Democratic Party) (defunct)
- Flaggers (movement)
- Ku Klux Klan
- League of the South
  - Southern Party (division of the League of the South)
- Sons of Confederate Veterans
- Southern Historical Society (defunct)
- United Daughters of the Confederacy
- Military Order of the Stars and Bars

== See also ==
- Culture of the Southern United States
- Far-right politics in the United States
- Far-right subcultures in the United States
- History of the Southern United States
- List of Ku Klux Klan organizations
- List of organizations designated by the Southern Poverty Law Center as hate groups
- List of white nationalist organizations
- Lost Cause of the Confederacy
- Politics of the Southern United States
- Racism against African Americans
- Radical right (United States)
- Right-wing politics in the United States
- Right-wing terrorism in the United States
- Secession in the United States
- Slavery in the United States
