= Daniel Friberg =

Swedish businessman and alt-right activist (born 1978)

- Born: 1978 (age 47–48); Gothenburg, Västra Götaland County, Sweden
- Education: University of Gothenburg
- Occupations: Businessman; publisher; writer
- Years active: 1997–present
- Organizations: Arktos Media; AltRight Corporation (2017–2018); Wiking Mineral (until 2016); Nordic League (2004–2009)
- Known for: CEO and co-founder of Arktos Media; Co-founder of Metapedia and Motpol; Co-founder of the AltRight Corporation
- Notable work: The Real Right Returns (Högern kommer tillbaka, 2015)
- Title: CEO of Arktos Media
- Movement: Alt-right; Identitarianism; European New Right

Daniel Friberg (born 1978) is a Swedish businessman, publisher, and writer, and a leading figure of the Swedish neo-fascist movement and global alt-right movements. He is the CEO and co-founder (in 2010) of Arktos Media. He co-founded the AltRight Corporation with American white supremacist Richard Spencer in 2017 but severed ties in May 2018. He is a former CEO of the mining company Wiking Mineral.

At the head of an international far-right media, literature, and music empire, Friberg is influenced in particular by the "metapolitical" strategy of the French Nouvelle Droite ("New Right"), defined by Guillaume Faye as the "social diffusion of ideas and cultural values for the sake of provoking profound, long-term, political transformation." Scholar Benjamin R. Teitelbaum has described Arktos Media as the "uncontested global leader in the publication of English-language Nouvelle Droite literature."

== Early life ==
Daniel Friberg was born in 1978 in Gothenburg, from an educated and politically left-leaning family. According to his own account, he was drawn to right-wing views after witnessing immigrant children targeting whites in his school. In his teenage years, he became involved with the Swedish white power skinhead culture of the 1990s. In middle school, he handed out leaflets for the nationalist Sweden Democrats party, and soon began printing his own propaganda with a laser printer to post it in his school.

In 1997, aged 19, he founded the agency Alternative Media and the newspaper Framtid (Future) in order to propagate his nationalist ideas in the Swedish society at large. Friberg spent his entire savings to print 21,000 copies and sent them to every graduating high school student in Stockholm and Gothenburg. In 1998, he joined the editorial staff of Folktribunen, the main outlet of the Swedish Resistance Movement, today the largest militant Nazi organization in Scandinavia. He eventually left the movement after it was radicalized, and started to distance himself from the white supremacist culture.

== Media activities ==
In 2001, Friberg cofounded Nordic Press (Nordiska förlaget), a publishing and music distribution company that primarily sold albums performed by white power bands, with the aim of providing nationalists a new "education" and "inspiration". His agency, Alternative Media, produced a three-CD project named Svensk ungdom (Swedish Youth). The first release in the series remains one of the most popular nationalist albums in the Nordic countries today. In parallel, Nordic Press turned into the first major source of anti-immigrant literature in nationalist circles and helped them display a "semi-academic character".

From 2004, Friberg became inspired by the Nouvelle Droite (French New Right) literature, especially the works of Alain de Benoist and Guillaume Faye, "It was this translation of the Nouvelle Droite manifesto that I read [...] online, written in English. [...] Thought it was totally brilliant, and wondered why these ideas weren't better known." The same year, he cofounded the Nordic League (Nordiska förbundet), an organization advocating an ostensibly metapolitical stance that echoed the ideas of the Nouvelle Droite.

Along with other leaders of the Nordic League, he co-established in July 2006 the Swedish-language blog portal Motpol and, the same year, the far-right online collaborative encyclopedia Metapedia, portrayed as an effort to advance the "cultural war". He was also closely involved in the creation of the messaging board Nordisk.ru, which attracted some 22,000 Scandinavian nationalists and other far-right users, including the Norwegian far-right mass killer Anders Breivik.

== Arktos Media ==
Friberg earned an MBA from University of Gothenburg in 2006. He worked in finance and management, then served as the CEO of Wiking Mineral until 2016, a mining company that includes other executives associated with the far-right, most notably Patrik Brinkmann.

In 2009, Friberg became the sole owner of the Nordic League and decided to cease the activities of the organization while allowing Metapedia and Motpol to continue to operate. In October, he planned with a Danish politician and two Danish collaborators the creation of the publishing house Arktos Media, officially established the following year in 2010. Friberg became the CEO of the company, and American John B. Morgan its chief editor. Arktos Media has translated to English and published various far-right authors such as Julius Evola, Alain de Benoist, Guillaume Faye, Alexandr Dugin, and Paul Gottfried. During the 2010s, it had grown as the largest retailer of radical Right literature in the world according to scholar Benjamin R. Teitelbaum. American white supremacist Richard Spencer has also credited Arktos with having increased access to European New Right and Identitarian literature among American white nationalists.

In early 2015, Friberg co-founded the online media outlet RightOn.net, and he published his first book, The Real Right Returns (Högern kommer tillbaka), where he contended that it was the right time for nationalists to enter the public sphere without fear of massive political repression.

In January 2017, he partnered with Spencer and the Swedish white nationalist website Red Ice to establish the Alt-Right Corporation and the website AltRight.com, seen as a major effort to unite European and U.S. white identity figures. Friberg was a scheduled speaker at the 2017 Unite the Right rally in Virginia, which broke out in violence and lead to the deaths of one counter-protester and two law enforcement officers. Friberg blamed the violence on antifa counter-protesters and police.

== Views ==
Friberg's beliefs include identitarianism, which opposes multiculturalism and migration. His 2015 book, The Real Right Returns: A Handbook for the True Opposition, has been described as Friberg's "manifesto, and a handbook for alt-right activists".

== Personal life ==
Since 2014, Friberg has lived in Budapest, Hungary.

He has spent occasional time in prison for weapons and other offenses between 1995 and 2010.
