= Kevin DeAnna =

American far-right writer and activist

Kevin DeAnna (born 1983) is an American White nationalist writer, activist and podcaster.

== History ==
=== Early years ===
As a student at the College of William & Mary, he led the campus chapter of Young Americans for Freedom and helped edit a libertarian-leaning student paper, The Remnant. After graduating he took a job at the Leadership Institute. Soon after, in 2006, he founded Youth for Western Civilization, which he led until 2012.

=== Activism ===
Around 2012 DeAnna left the Leadership Institute for World Net Daily, where he wrote many articles over the next five years, mostly without a byline. At the same time, DeAnna wrote hundreds of article for white nationalist publications under the pseudonyms "Gregory Hood" (writing for Radix Journal, Counter-Currents, American Renaissance, and others) and "James Kirkpatrick" (writing for VDARE). DeAnna has also published two books under these names. He is a former member of the Wolves of Vinland.

DeAnna has been described by the Southern Poverty Law Center as one of the "main, ideological architects" of the American White nationalist movement in the 21st century. In his self-titled "White Nationalist Memo to White Male Republicans", he wrote that they should "fight for a country of [their] own". DeAnna has hosted a podcast produced by White nationalist organization American Renaissance.

In the 2010s DeAnna dated former Breitbart editor Katie McHugh, who leaked some of their emails to the Southern Poverty Law Center after she left the alt right milieu.

== Books ==
- Hood, Gregory. Waking Up from the American Dream. Counter-Currents, 2016
- Kirkpatrick, James. Conservatism, Inc.: The Battle for the American Right. Arktos Media, 2019
