= Defiance (book) =

Book by Savitri Devi

- Author: Savitri Devi
- Genre: Memoir
- Publication date: 1950
- Publication place: India
- Pages: 579
- OCLC: 79343766
- Preceded by: A Warning to the Hindus
- Followed by: Gold in the Furnace

Defiance is a 1950 memoir by Savitri Devi, which tells of her arrest, trial, and imprisonment on the charge of distributing Nazi propaganda in Germany in 1949. It was first published by Devi's husband Asit Krishna Mukherji in Calcutta.

== Contents ==
The book is dedicated to Herta Ehlert and opens with quotations from the Bhagawad Gita and Adolf Hitler. She argues that Germany's loss in World War II was a sign of the Kali Yuga, the final age of Hinduism and a time of decay. She writes:

It is the superior man’s business to feel happy in the service of the highest purpose of Nature which is the return to original perfection,—to supermanhood. It is the business of every man to be happy to serve that purpose, directly or indirectly, from his natural place, which is the place his race gives him in the scheme of creation. And if he cannot be? Let him not be. Who cares? Time rolls on, just the same, marked by the great Individuals who have understood the true meaning of history, and striven to remold the earth according to the standards of the eternal Order, against the downward rush of decay, result of life in falsehood;— the Men against Time.

It is a memoir of her arrest, trial, and imprisonment on the charge of distributing Nazi propaganda in Germany in 1949, for what Devi described as "maintaining the military and Nazi spirit in Germany". Most of the book focuses on her imprisonment at Werl Prison. Devi describes as admirable her compatriots in prison, many of whom were Nazi war criminals; she gives accounts of their lives in Nazi Germany.

== Background and publication history ==
Devi was a significant figure in the development of neo-Nazi esotericism. In 1949, she had undertaken a "pilgrimage" to Germany, where she distributed Nazi materials and was arrested and jailed. The book was written after Devi concluded her "pilgrimage" and returned to France; she spent the next few years writing this and some other Nazi books. It was written alongside Gold in the Furnace, which was published the next year. It was first published by Devi's husband Asit Krishna Mukherji's imprint in 1950 in Calcutta. Some sources say it was published the next year, in 1951. Its first edition is 579 pages long.

Defiance was republished in excerpted form in the neo-Nazi magazine National Socialist World in the sixth Winter 1968 issue. NSW was edited by William Luther Pierce, a member of the American Nazi Party. Many other works of Devi were also republished in the periodical as Pierce had an interest in her works; Defiance was published after Devi's The Lightning and the Sun had already received a positive response from neo-Nazi readers of the magazine. After its republication in Pierce's magazine, Defiance became popular with the neo-Nazi underground.

== Analysis ==
Jeffrey Kaplan described it as, in comparison to Devi's other works, "more frankly autobiographical", while Nicholas Goodrick-Clarke also said it was more autobiographical in comparison to her other works, focusing more on her "last ill-fated propaganda mission". Frederick J. Simonelli noted it as one of Devi's "main works of Aryan mysticism and National Socialist philosophy". Damon T. Barry saw the book as making it evident that Devi believed in esoteric neo-Nazism as providing "a political and spiritual basis of political activity for the purpose of preparing the emergence of Aryan god-men", and as evidence of her seeing this as incompatible with Christianity.
