= Jason Jorjani =

American philosopher (born 1981)

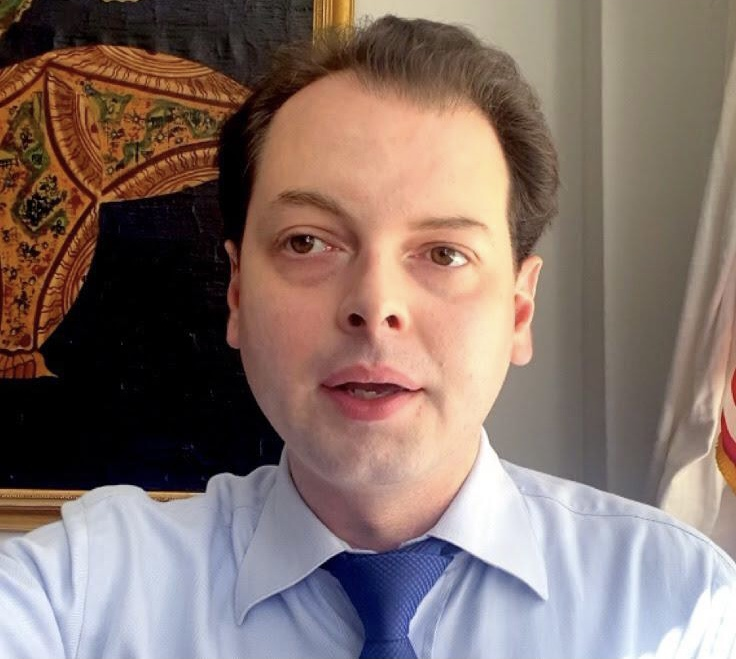
- Jorjani in 2020
- Born: February 21, 1981 (age 45); Manhattan, New York, U.S.
- Occupations: Writer, lecturer, former editor-in-chief of Arktos Media
- Known for: Alt-right, Prometheism

Academic background
- Education: Dalton School
- Alma mater: Fordham University; New York University (BA; MA); Stony Brook University (PhD)
- Influences: Heidegger; Hedayat; Rand

Academic work
- Discipline: Philosophy, history
- Institutions: New Jersey Institute of Technology
- Website: Official website

Jason Reza Jorjani (born February 21, 1981) is an American philosopher and writer. He was a lecturer at the New Jersey Institute of Technology, former editor-in-chief of the publishing company Arktos Media, and co-founder of the AltRight Corporation with Richard Spencer.

== Early life ==
Jason Reza Jorjani was born and raised in Manhattan, New York, the only child of an Iranian immigrant father of Qajar descent and a mother who comes from a working-class family of "northern European heritage", more specifically Irish and Scandinavian. He is a dual citizen of the United States and Iran.

He attended the Dalton School, on the Upper East Side. After high school, he attended Fordham University for a year before transferring to New York University, where he earned undergraduate and graduate degrees. In 2013, he received a PhD in philosophy from Stony Brook University on Long Island.

== Career ==
While serving as a full-time faculty member at the New Jersey Institute of Technology, Jorjani taught courses on science, technology, and society (STS), the philosophy of Martin Heidegger, and the history of Iran. In 2016, Jorjani became editor of alt-right publisher Arktos Media.

=== Academic suspension and lawsuit ===
In September 2017, Jorjani was suspended from his teaching position at the New Jersey Institute of Technology in response to a covert video recorded by Patrik Hermansson, a Swedish antifascist activist, who presented himself to Jorjani under the false identity "Erik Hellberg", in which Jorjani predicted a future where concentration camps would return to Europe and Adolf Hitler, Napoleon Bonaparte, Alexander the Great would appear on European currency by 2050. Hermansson met with Jorjani at an Irish bar in midtown Manhattan in June, where the two talked about a future in which Europe embraces fascism. "It's going to end with the expulsion of the majority of migrants including citizens, who are of Muslim descent, generally" Jorjani said. "That's how it's going to end. It's going to end with concentration camps and expulsion and war. At the cost of a few hundred million people."

Jorjani claimed that his remarks were spliced into pieces from a two-hour conversation and rearranged out of context, and that the prediction was a warning of a dystopian future, not an endorsement.

In February 2017, NJIT officials told Jorjani they would not renew his annual teaching contract. In July 2018, Jorjani filed for a $25M lawsuit against NJIT, alleging that campus officials violated Jorjani's constitutional right to freedom of speech and association and that campus leaders and colleagues subsequently defamed Jorjani in campus-wide emails and in the student newspaper. Denise Anderson, a spokeswoman for the school, denied the allegations and said, "Dr. Jorjani's claims of wrongdoing by the university or its representatives are untrue, and we intend to vigorously defend against any such claims."

In March 2019, U.S. District Judge William Martini ruled that Jorjani does not have a case for defamation, stating: "The general allegation is implausible because the facts alleged do not support an inference that defendants knew the recording was edited to misconstrue plaintiff's actual views."

== Association with Richard Spencer ==
Jorjani had met Richard Spencer at a conference from the white supremacist think tank National Policy Institute, at which both of them spoke. At the conference, attendees gave Nazi salutes as Spencer led the crowd in shouting "Heil Trump!" Jorjani subsequently claimed that he did not intend to speak at the conference and that he rejected the white nationalist ideology Spencer began integrating into their organization.

=== Founding of the AltRight Corporation ===
In January 2017, Jorjani co-founded AltRight Corporation and AltRight.com with Richard Spencer before resigning less than a year later in August 2017, for the stated reasons that he wanted to commit to the Iranian Renaissance Organization, a 501(c)(3) cultural organization. Jorjani ultimately took a negative view of the AltRight Corporation, referring to it as a "miscarriage" and "total failure".

== Involvement in politics ==
=== Jellyfish ===
Among the things that Jorjani would tell Benjamin Teitelbaum, one thing that he placed a lot of emphasis on was his contact with a man in London (who Jorjani refused to name), who was involved variously in neo-Nazism, Satanism, and occultism, had a network connected to wealthy Muslims and possibly members of the British government, and was emailing Jorjani over the particular interest he had in his book Prometheus and Atlas. Shortly thereafter, this same man began giving Jorjani advice in the direction of ultimately overthrowing the Iranian government alongside those in Turkey, Venezuela, and China by using the services of a private intelligence firm by the name of Jellyfish, founded by veterans of the private security firm Blackwater. Among the other goals of Jellyfish discusses with Jorjani included the plan of creating what they called "micro-cities" which would function as very large and sophisticated refugee camps that would have been built in North Africa to deal with the refugee crisis.

Within this setup, the person of contact for Jorjani specifically was a man by the name of Michael Bagley, who was a former aide for the Democratic senator Patty Murray, and based on the advice of the unnamed Londoner Jorjani and Richard Spencer would go out to meet with Bagley for the first time in September 2016. During their meeting Bagley claimed to Jorjani that Jellyfish maintained a secret radio station in Croatia, which was within range of Iran and could be used to broadcast anti-government messages. Furthermore, in order for the plan to work, Donald Trump had to win the election in order for the anti-government activities to get financial sponsorship, after which Steve Bannon and Jared Kushner were integral to this. Particularly, in the case of Bannon, since he was known to be a reader of Arktos Media, a publication that the unnamed man in London advised Jorjani to become its editor-in-chief, and since Jorjani was supposed to be a man of direct contact with, alongside Jellyfish. At some point Jorjani would meet the unnamed man in London, when he himself was there for a visit with exiled Iranian nationalist groups, sometime shortly after the election of Trump in 2016. On January 2, 2017, Jorjani received an email from Bagley saying that the US Government funding would be received by February 1, after Trump's inauguration. On March 8, 2017, Jorjani would write an email to Bagley in which he stated he wanted to get rid of Richard Spencer as the leader of the AltRight Corporation. At some point Bagley stopped answering Jorjani's emails, but he received a document from the unnamed Londoner describing how Jellyfish intended to infiltrate the Venezuelan oil. In between January 2 and March 8, as part of the plan Jellyfish claimed to Jorjani that they made contacts with the right people within the Trump Administration, which is reflected in an article put out by the pro-Putin Israeli commentator Avigdor Eskin, who claimed in article published by RIA Novosti on February 2 that Jellyfish had made contact with Michael Flynn. Ultimately, nothing is understood to have been achieved in Jorjani's relationship with Jellyfish, since Michael Bagley was arrested by the FBI and Steve Bannon reportedly had never heard of him.

Furthermore, according to Teitelbaum, the unnamed Londoner who he speaks of is connected to the Sufi traditionalist Martin Lings and has many ties to wealthy Middle Easterners including the former Emir of Qatar Hamad bin Khalifa Al Thani and the Iranian nationalist Darius Guppy, who is known for illegally raising money and is himself a friend of Boris Johnson.

According to Benjamin Teitelbaum, Jorjani presented him a copy of Prometheus and Atlas to give to Steve Bannon as a gift.

== Views ==
Jorjani's ideas have been described by journalist Olivia Goldhill as influenced by Dark Enlightenment philosophy, particularly that of Nick Land. In a 2023 Break the Rules livestream, Jorjani denied being influenced by Land.

=== The Prometheist Manifesto ===
In "The Prometheist Manifesto", Jorjani criticised the modern concept of God as a "jealous and tyrannically wrathful God-Father, archetypally identical to Zeus". Instead, Jorjani supported the idea of the myth of Prometheus as the creator of man and likened the fire that he stole from Olympus as a symbol of the power of technology and science to free humanity from scarcity and ignorance.

=== Views on white nationalism ===
Speaking at a conference organized by Richard Spencer in 2016, Jorjani repeated the white genocide conspiracy theory when speaking of the collapse of the Sasanian Empire; he described it as the "first and greatest white genocide." In 2018, Jorjani identified himself as an "Iranian Zionist". Jorjani has written in support of eugenics and has claimed that Iran cannot culturally, technologically, and scientifically advance unless it restores its "pre-Arab and pre-Mongol genetic character". In 2017, he predicted that Muslim citizens and immigrants would be deported from Europe by 2050.

He has, however, stated that he deliberately infiltrated the Alt-Right movement at the behest of individuals who were very close to the Donald Trump 2016 presidential campaign to steer it away from Spencer-style White Nationalism.

In 2017, Jorjani stated that he is not a white nationalist or racist. He identifies himself as a progressive and a feminist. After resigning from AltRight, he stated that the organization was "reduced, basically, to a platform for organizing alt-right rallies attended by some very questionable individuals who I want not very much to do with".

According to Harrison Fluss and Landon Frim writing in Jacobin, Jorjani has promoted various antisemitic and white nationalist fringe conspiracy theories, despite disputing the label:

Jorjani's writings, political activities, speeches, and media appearances have drawn charges of antisemitism and Islamophobia. In one instance, he suggested that Yahweh and Allah were actually space aliens who enslaved their believers and tricked them into committing genocide. He has openly characterized certain high-ranking Nazi officials as akin to supermen with psychic powers. While Jorjani has vehemently denied the charges of bigotry leveled against him, his public statements do make you wonder.

=== Iran and geopolitics ===
Jorjani has said that he was involved in an attempt to build a new Persian Empire, which he claims was led by an organisation known as the "Iranian Renaissance Organization". With regard to the project, Jorjani claimed that the new Iran would be in a struggle against a nascent Islamic Caliphate. Specifically, he has said about this project that it was intended:

to create an economic and security corridor from the Baltic Sea to the Black Sea and across to the Caucasus. This "Neo-Scythian" Ukraine-based approach to the long-term revitalization and liberation of Europe [was] linked to a future, post-Islamic Greater Iran via the Caucasus.

=== Islam ===
According to Jorjani, everything supposedly achieved in the Islamic Golden Age was misappropriated from ancient Iranian culture. Furthermore, he is critical of the entirety of the Abrahamic religions, emphasizing that the modern "Judeo-Christian" West only produces materialism and meaningless technology while Islam has been a source of tyranny and white genocide.

Furthermore, Jorjani is critical of Aleksandr Dugin for his support for Islam and Islamic Republic of Iran as part of his goal to spread Traditionalism.

Despite his criticisms of Islam, he has stated that the origin of Islam is Iranian, specifically the following:

"Islam was the ideological equivalent of a genetically engineered virus designed to inoculate a particular population, which then enters a group with a different genome, a population for which it has not been tailored. Instead of being inoculated, this alien population succumbs to and spreads the disease that the virus was meant to inoculate the target population against. The Mithraic Magi and their Parthian feudal lords had designed Islam to work on the Iranian psycho-social system, with the aim of catalyzing an immune response that would manifest as rebellion against both Islam and any form of totalitarian state religion such as the Sassanian State Orthodoxy. What was supposed to incite Luciferian rebellion in the free-spirited minds of Aryans was swallowed whole by Turks and Mongols. Exactly those characteristics of Islam that were supposed to trigger a response to oppressive hierarchy, conservative litigiousness, draconian discipline and sadistic punishment, appealed to the despotically oriental souls of these Siberian nomads. "Gabriel" did not foresee that."

When Jorjani speaks of the angel Gabriel in the quote above, he is specifically referring to the idea promulgated by extremist Shi'i sects that Gabriel was in fact Salman the Persian, a Persian merchant who had initially converted to Islam and traded extensively in the Arabian Peninsula. The reasons Jorjani believes this are because of his connections to the wife of Muhammad, Khadija bint Khuwaylid (who he claims was a Jew), which led to Salman befriending Muhammad. This led to rumors that he influenced ideas appearing in the Quran into Muhammad's head. As for Salman's motives, Jorjani insists that Salman was working for the House of Karen as a military operative for several reasons. Firstly, Salman was knowledgeable in how to use military equipment and proficient in several languages. Secondly, Salman helped bring Muhammad to victory at the Battle of the Trench and the Battle of Badr. Thirdly, at these battles, the Muslims wore green, and the crescent in Islam is a symbol derived from the House of Karen. Lastly, since the Arabs overthrew the Sasanian dynasty, the historical rivals of the Parthians, to which the House of Karen belonged, all combined with the greater purpose of inoculating Iranians to any form of religious totalitarianism by engineering an extreme version of it in the form of Islam.

=== Belief in psychical phenomena ===
Jorjani has expressed the belief that "psychical phenomena as key to developing a postmodern or archaeofuturist science that would deconstruct the distinction between science and spirituality".

== Notable works ==
- Prometheus and Atlas. London: Arktos. 2016. ISBN 978-1910524619.
- World State of Emergency. London: Arktos. 2017. ISBN 978-1912079933.
- Lovers of Sophia. London: Arktos. 2017. ISBN 978-0994595881.
- Novel Folklore: On Sadegh Hedayat's The Blind Owl. San Francisco: Counter-Currents Publishing. 2018. ISBN 978-1642641035.
- Iranian Leviathan: a Monumental History of Mithra's Abode. London: Arktos. 2019. ISBN 978-1912975402.
- Prometheism. London: Arktos. 2020. ISBN 978-1912975891.
- Faustian Futurist. London: Arktos. 2020. ISBN 978-1912975952.
- Closer Encounters. London: Arktos. 2021. ISBN 978-1914208386.
- Uber Man. London: Arktos. 2022. ISBN 978-1914208768.
- Artemis Unveiled. London: Arktos. 2023. ISBN 978-1915755162.
- Erosophia. London: Arktos. 2024. ISBN 978-1915755520.
- Metapolemos. London: Arktos. 2025. ISBN 978-1915755520.

== Bibliography ==
- Teitelbaum, Benjamin (2020). War for Eternity: Inside Bannon's Far-Right Circle of Global Power Brokers. Hackett Publishing Company. ISBN 978-0-06-297845-5.
- Beiner, Ronald (2022). "The Conservative Revolution of the 21st Century: The Curious Case of Jason Jorjan". In McAdams, A. James; Castrillon, Alejandro (eds.). Contemporary Far-Right Thinkers and the Future of Liberal Democracy. New York: Green World Press. ISBN 9780367611613.
