= YWC =

YWC may refer to:

- Ying Wa College, a direct subsidized boys' secondary school in Kowloon, Hong Kong
- Youth for Western Civilization, a far-right youth organization in the United States
- Yuet Wah College, a boys' Catholic secondary school in Macau
