= Ulfheim =

Ulfheim is Norse for "wolf home". It can refer to:

- Squire Ulfheim, a character in Henrik Ibsen's play When We Dead Awaken
- Ulfheim, Virginia, an unincorporated community operated by the Wolves of Vinland
