= The Settlement =

The Settlement may refer to:

== Films ==
- The Settlement (1984 film)
- The Settlement (1999 film)

== Places ==
- The Settlement, British Virgin Islands, the main town on Anegada
- The Settlement, a former Black neighborhood at the site of the Mount Pleasant Baptist Church and Cemetery in Gainesville, Virginia, United States
- Thomson Bay Settlement, Rottnest Island, Western Australia, also known as simply The Settlement
- Edinburgh of the Seven Seas, capital and main settlement of Tristan da Cunha
- Flying Fish Cove, the main settlement on Christmas Island
