= Youth for Western Civilization =

Defunct American political youth organization

- Abbreviation: YWC
- Formation: 2008; 18 years ago
- Dissolved: 2012; 14 years ago
- Type: Youth activist group
- Legal status: Inactive
- Purpose: Anti-multiculturalism (Pro-West)
- Staff: Roughly 10 members at each chapter

Youth for Western Civilization (YWC) was a far right student group registered as a 501(c)(3) non-profit organization in the United States. The group became a corporation in 2006 and began actively organizing in 2008. Kevin DeAnna founded the organization. Its honorary chairman was former Colorado US Representative Tom Tancredo.

The group opposed what it viewed as "radical multiculturalism, socialism, and mass immigration" and a "poisonous and bigoted leftist campus climate". It also opposed affirmative action on college campuses. YWC was a more conservative and issue-specific alternative to groups such as the College Republicans (CRs), although many of its leaders and members were also involved in the CRs; the YWC was represented at the 2009 National CR Convention.

Critics considered the YWC to be white nationalists. Founder DeAnna later became an alt-right activist.

YWC was organized on at least seven university campuses. According to its website, the group hoped to inspire Western youth on the "basis of pride in their American and Western heritage", defeat "leftism on campus", and create a right-wing subculture as an alternative to what it calls a "poisonous and bigoted" campus climate. It said its mission was "to organize, educate, and train activists dedicated to the revival of Western Civilization".

== Chapters ==
YWC had chapters at the University of North Carolina at Chapel Hill, Vanderbilt University, American University, Elon University, the University of Connecticut-Storrs, Liberty University, Boise State University, Bentley University, and Towson University; there was also a chapter at Providence College recognized by the national organization but not by the school.

== Logo ==
The imagery and rhetoric employed by YWC have also contributed to concerns. The group's web site featured in black and white, a hand gripping a hammer. YWC members say it's meant to symbolize Charles Martel, who stopped the impending Islamic expansion into Europe during its early years. However, the logo was criticized by some who say it closely resembled a fasces.

== Activism ==
YWC members engaged in a range of activities, including protesting a performance of The Vagina Monologues and a presentation by poet Emanuel Xavier, and bringing speakers such as Tom Tancredo, Robert Spencer, and Bay Buchanan to university campuses. They also invited white supremacist Richard B. Spencer at Vanderbilt University in 2010 and Rhodes College in 2011.

On October 5, 2009, the Vanderbilt YWC chapter protested at the site of a Wachovia Bank in Nashville because of Wachovia's affiliation with the now-defunct Association of Community Organizations for Reform Now (ACORN).

Matthew Heimbach founded and led one YWC chapter.

== Tom Tancredo incident ==
On April 14, 2009, campus police at the University of North Carolina at Chapel Hill used pepper spray and the threat of tasers against protesters outside the room where Tom Tancredo was scheduled to speak to YWC against in-state tuition benefits for illegal immigrants. The group's president, Riley Matheson, attempted to introduce Tancredo but was shouted down by protesters. When Tancredo appeared, he was booed with shouts of "racist" and "white supremacist". He attempted for several minutes to speak but was repeatedly shouted down.

A window was smashed a few feet from Tancredo. Two protesters held a sign reading "No Dialogue with Hate" in front of Tancredo's face. Tancredo was eventually escorted out of the room by the police.

Tancredo later claimed that a police officer accidentally broke Tancredo's middle toe by stomping on his foot, as the officer attempted to escort the speaker through a crowd of protesters.

UNC-Chapel Hill chancellor Holden Thorp and UNC System President Erskine Bowles called Tancredo to apologize for the incident. The head of the American Civil Liberties Union in North Carolina said that the video of the incident was "chilling" and "de facto censorship".

Tancredo returned to UNC-Chapel Hill on April 25 to speak, again at the invitation of YWC. During his second appearance, Tancredo gave a brief speech entitled "Is Western civilization worth saving?" He was interrupted once, when two thirds of the audience stood up, chanted "No human being is illegal" and filed out of the room. Tancredo finished his speech and took questions while protesters rallied in the Pit outside.

== Cramer resignation ==
On September 18, 2009, Elliot Cramer, the faculty adviser for the University of North Carolina branch of the YWC, resigned after writing in an e-mail that he had a gun and knew how to use it. The e-mail came in response to brochures opposing the organization and had Cramer's photograph, home address and telephone number. It said in bold letters, "Why is your professor supporting white supremacy?"

Nikhil Patel, president of the university's chapter of the YWC, sent an e-mail to Cramer notifying him of the brochures and saying that he was concerned for his safety. Cramer responded to the e-mail with "I have a Colt 45 and I know how to use it. I used to be able to hit a quarter at 50 feet seven times out of 10." Cramer also sent Patel's letter and his reply to the chancellor of the university, Holden Thorp.

Thorp then contacted Cramer, expressing concern that this e-mail might be used against the university and ultimately asked him to resign from the faculty adviser position. He said Cramer's statement was "highly inappropriate and not consistent with the civil discourse we are trying to achieve". Cramer explained to the chancellor that this was not meant to be taken seriously but that the chancellor should know about the distribution of these brochures.

Three advisers were appointed to replace Cramer.

== Kevin DeAnna ==
Kevin DeAnna led YWC throughout its existence. Earlier, as a student at the College of William & Mary, he led the campus chapter of Young Americans for Freedom and helped edit a libertarian-leaning student paper, The Remnant. After graduating, he took a job at the Leadership Institute, founding YWC soon after. After leaving YWC in 2012, DeAnna left the Leadership Institute for World Net Daily, where he wrote many articles over the next five years, mostly without a byline. At the same time, DeAnna wrote hundreds of articles for white nationalist publications (including Radix Journal, Counter-Currents, American Renaissance, and VDARE) under the pen names James Kirkpatrick and Gregory Hood. He was a member of the Wolves of Vinland at one point. In 2020, Buzzfeed News reported that DeAnna had met with Peter Thiel in the runup to the 2016 election.
