= The Lightning and the Sun =

1958 philosophy book by Savitri Devi

- Cover of the 1979 Samisdat Publishers edition
- Author: Savitri Devi
- Language: English
- Subject: Philosophy of history Esoteric neo-Nazism
- Published: 1958 (self-published); 1966 (National Socialist World); 1979 (Samisdat Publishers); 1994 (Renaissance Press); 2000 (National Vanguard Books); 2015 (Counter-Currents Publishing)
- Publication place: India
- Media type: Print
- Pages: 432
- OCLC: 237606467
- Preceded by: Pilgrimage
- Followed by: Impeachment of Man

The Lightning and the Sun is a 1958 book by Savitri Devi, in which the author outlines her esoteric Hitlerist philosophy of history along with her critique of the modern world. The book is known for the author's claim that Adolf Hitler was an avatar of the Hindu god Vishnu and its cyclical view of history, which Savitri Devi intertwines with Nazism. It portrays Hitler as a "Man against Time", exhibiting both "Lightning and Sun" qualities: in Devi's worldview, destruction used for life-affirming purposes.

Devi began writing the book in 1948 in Scotland, ultimately completing it in Germany in March 1956. It was initially self-published by Devi in 1958 in Calcutta, India, financed by Devi's job as an interpreter. The book was obscure for several years, until 1966, when an abridged version was published by William Luther Pierce in the neo-Nazi magazine National Socialist World. The 1966 republication exposed the book to a worldwide demographic of neo-Nazis and popularized it among them. The neo-Nazi publishing house Samisdat Publishers, operated by Ernst Zündel, issued a new illustrated edition in 1979. The book was excerpted in Adam Parfrey's 1987 anthology Apocalypse Culture.

Described by scholars as Devi's most significant work, The Lightning and the Sun was greatly influential on neo-Nazis internationally and continues to be popular with the far-right. It has since been republished by a variety of neo-Nazi and white nationalist publishing houses, including National Vanguard Books, Counter-Currents Publishing, and Kerry Bolton's Renaissance Press. It introduced esoteric neo-Nazism to a wider audience of white supremacists; among the figures the work has influenced are David Myatt, Miguel Serrano, and William Luther Pierce. The music group Radio Werewolf released an EP inspired and titled after the book in 1989.

== Background ==
Savitri Devi, born Maximiani Portas, was a French-born Nazi sympathizer; in 1932, Portas moved to India to study "Aryan religion", where she converted to Hinduism and changed her name to Savitri Devi to honor "the Aryan sun goddess". She became fascinated by Adolf Hitler in 1935, and spied for the Axis powers during World War II. She returned to Europe after the war, where she began work on The Lightning and the Sun in April 1948, while in Edinburgh, Scotland. At the time Savitri Devi was working as a wardrobe manager for a dance company. The book was to be her first major expression of her "Aryo-Nazi" philosophy". While writing the book, she was imprisoned for spreading Nazi propaganda in Germany. She continued her work on it while imprisoned.

After a break, she picked up work on the tome while in Lyon, France, in 1951 and 1952. After embarking on a "pilgrimage" to various Nazi sites, she (illegally, as she had been banned from entry for five years following her earlier prison sentence) moved to Emsdetten, Germany, where she stayed with a friend. While writing the book, Savitri Devi befriended German pilot turned neo-Nazi activist Hans-Ulrich Rudel, ultimately completing the book during a March 1956 visit from Rudel. Savitri Devi returned to India in 1957, where she became an interpreter, which covered the production costs for the release of The Lightning and the Sun.

== Summary ==
The work is dedicated "To the godlike Individual of our times; the Man against Time; the greatest European of all times; both Sun and Lightning: Adolf Hitler, as a tribute of unfailing love and loyalty, for ever and ever." It opens with quotations from The Bhagavad Gita and Rudolf Hess. In a preface, Savitri Devi writes that the book "could be described as a personal answer to the events of 1945 and of the following years."

In The Lightning and the Sun, Devi attempts to weave Nazism and esoteric Hitlerism with a cyclic view of history taken from Hinduism, arguing that time begins with a Golden Age and gradually decays through a Silver Age and Bronze Age into a final Kali Yuga, or Dark Age. According to Devi, we are in the iron age. She elucidates her concept of "Men in Time," "Men above Time," and "Men against Time" using the lives of Genghis Khan, Akhnaton (Akhenaten), and Adolf Hitler respectively. Genghis Khan is used as an example of a "Man in Time" who exhibits Lightning (destructive) qualities and furthers historical decay. Akhnaton is used to illustrate a "Man above Time" who exhibits Sun (creative/life-affirming) qualities and seeks to transcend the process of historical decay. The book eulogizes Hitler, who is used to illustrate a "Man against Time" who exhibits both Lightning and Sun qualities (destructive power harnessed for a life-affirming purpose) and seek to fight historical decay by using violent, Dark-Age methods to achieve a Golden Age state of existence.

Her biographical account of Hitler is taken from August Kubizek's. From Kubizek's account Devi bases her claim that Hitler had been an Avatar, which he had known since childhood. The book claims that Hitler was an avatar of the Hindu god Vishnu and the savior of "Aryans". Nazi Germany is portrayed as the peak of "Aryan development" and the loss of World War II by the Nazis is called a "tragedy". The Schutzstaffel are portrayed as necessary to restore the world, representing an esoteric restoration of the cosmic order and nature religion. In the final chapter of the book, Savitri Devi expands further upon her cyclic view of history. She argues that at the end of the Dark Age, Kalki (initially identified by Devi as Hitler, though it is unclear if she held this view after his death) will appear and usher in a new Golden Age, dispelling the current "Age of Gloom", into a future where Hitler will be honored and his legacy remembered.

== Publication history ==
The Lightning and the Sun was first self-published in Calcutta, India, in 1958, printed by Temple Press. The first edition was 432 pages long. It was published the same year as another of her books, Pilgrimage. In 1960, her friend and fellow neo-Nazi Hans-Ulrich Rudel sent the book to Otto Skorzeny, which first introduced Devi's works into the broader neo-Nazi network. For some years after this the book was largely unavailable.

After Savitri Devi began a correspondence with George Lincoln Rockwell, the founder of the American Nazi Party, Rockwell and his associate William Luther Pierce (Pierce had an interest in "racial esotericism"; he later authored The Turner Diaries) became fascinated by her works and thought, then obscure. Pierce was impressed by the book, and as a result in early 1966, a condensed version of the book was published, entitled "The Lightning and the Sun (A New Edition)" in Rockwell and Pierce's National Socialist World, a neo-Nazi magazine aimed at a more educated demographic. This came in its first issue and took up the majority of the issue, from pages 13–90. The response by neo-Nazi readers was enthusiastic, and more of Savitri Devi's writings were included in the magazine in later issues.

The release in National Socialist World was the first wide exposure of the international neo-Nazi movement to Devi's writings and ideas; while she had published many prior works on the topic, they had only been printed privately and in limited runs, or distributed personally through people like Skorzeny and Rudel. The National Socialist World republication popularized her works and greatly expanded the reach of her beliefs and influence.

In 1979, the book, by then out of print, was republished in a 448 page illustrated second edition by the neo-Nazi publishing house Samisdat Publishers in Buffalo, New York and Toronto. Samisdat was operated by Holocaust denier Ernst Zündel. Zündel wrote the preface to the 1979 edition, where he praised Savitri Devi and recounted his meeting her and the influence she had had on him. In late 1982, Samisdat offered several cassettes of interviews with Devi with the book. This offer was publicized worldwide through card flyers with a notice that exclaimed in all caps, "the Hitler cult revealed", continuing with "discovered alive in India: Hitler's guru!"

The book was excerpted in Adam Parfrey's 1987 anthology Apocalypse Culture. New Zealand neo-Nazi Kerry Bolton, the leader of the Ordo Sinistra Vivendi and the Black Order, published a condensed third edition in 1994 with his Renaissance Press in Paraparaumu Beach. Bolton promoted his edition alongside interviews with James Mason. Six years later in 2000 William Luther Pierce's Hillsboro, West Virginia-based National Vanguard Books came out with an illustrated abridged edition of 199 pages, edited by Pierce. By this time the book was widely available online, and has been republished in online archives of far-right material and of Devi's work. In 2015, the book was republished by the white nationalist San Francisco-based publishing company Counter-Currents Publishing as part of a wider collection of Devi's works. This edition is unabridged and 455 pages long.

== Legacy and analysis ==
The Lightning of the Sun was very influential on neo-Nazism and is popular with many neo-Nazis, particularly those involved in esotericism. It introduced esoteric neo-Nazism to a wider audience of English-speaking white supremacists. Academic Jeffrey Kaplan called it Devi's most important work and her "masterpiece". Kaplan described it as a "remarkable exposition of occult National Socialism that explicitly deifies Hitler as the savior of the Aryan people," as well as a "Golden Age fantasy and ode to Adolf Hitler". Historian Alexandra Minna Stern described the book as Savitri Devi's "most well known and far-fetched work", and as "more a mystical treatise than a narrative interpretation of the rise and fall of the Third Reich". Scholar Damon T. Berry noted its influence on William Luther Pierce, and noted the book as "an important work by one of the most important articulators of occult National Socialism in the postwar period". Frederick J. Simonelli called it one of Devi's "main works of Aryan mysticism and National Socialist philosophy".

Esoteric neo-Nazi Miguel Serrano embraced the book's philosophy and ideas, which shaped his own conception of Nazism, also intertwined with Hindu religiosity; he praised Devi as "as the greatest fighter after Adolf Hitler, Rudolf Hess, and Josef Goebbels" and "the priestess of Odin". Satanist neo-Nazi David Myatt, likely the founder of the Order of Nine Angles, was fascinated by the work and recounted its influence on him in an interview. Odinist Jost Turner was also taken with the work and its depiction of Hitler as a divine figure. The musician Boyd Rice recommended the book in the single issue of his publication Wake and wrote a 2001 essay debating her theories. James Mason, an associate of Rice, quoted the book's statements on Hitler's "divine cause" in his periodical Siege, later developed into his influential neo-Nazi book Siege. Mason praised her writings and called them underrated. The music group Radio Werewolf, also affiliated with Rice, released an EP in 1989 inspired by the book, under the same title. The German far-right band Turbund Sturmwerk also quoted her on their album releases. Counter-Currents Publishing, which reprinted this and other works of Savitri Devi, derived their slogan, "Books Against Time", from the work.
