= A Warning to the Hindus =

Book by Savitri Devi

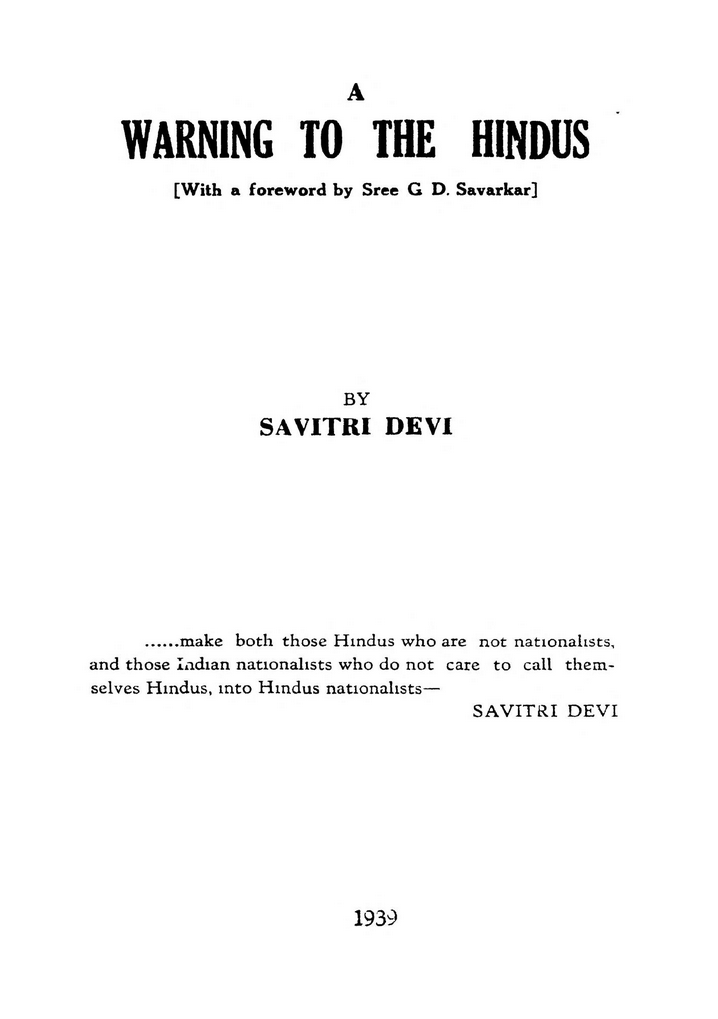
- Title page of the 1939 edition
- Author: Savitri Devi
- Language: English
- Publisher: Hindu Mission
- Publication date: 1939
- Followed by: Defiance

A Warning to the Hindus is a 1939 booklet by Savitri Devi. It was written to further Indian nationalism by way of Nazi ethics and spirituality. Published in Calcutta, its preface was written by Ganesh Damodar Savarkar.

Savitri believed the Indian people to be of Aryan descent, and thus sought to promote explicitly Nazi ideals, such as ethnic purity and xenophobia, within India. Within the text, emphasis is focused on many supposed horrors the future could hold should India choose to accept diversity and reject Nazi Aryanism. The author projected Hindu India as the last surviving remnant of ancient Aryan spirituality, and issued this work as a warning to what she perceived as the threat of submergence through 'alien,' meaning non-Aryan, influences, such as Islam.

== Summary ==
A Warning to the Hindus is Devi’s attempt to alert Hindus to the threat of submergence and cultural alienation, which she saw as resulting from the disproportional growth of the Muslim population in India, "Mohammedanization". She argues for Hinduism as the national religion of India, and that it was the only source of the real India. She thought the hitherto complacent response of upper-caste Hindus would result in Hinduism suffering the same fate as pagan classical Greece, and argued that:

It becomes more and more clear that what the Hindus need, is to recover along with their national consciousness, their military virtues of old: and to become a military race.

The book expresses admiration of Hinduism for its view of visible beauty, its broad artistic outlook on life and the universe, and its conception of God as both creative and destructive: living expressions of Aryan Paganism, which Devi saw as being lost in the West. As an outspoken Nazi, she criticizes Judaism, Christianity, and Islam as creedal religions, and for being narrowly anthropocentric, in contrast with Hinduism, which is presented as biocentric.

Devi proposes that the numerical decline of Hinduism could be successfully remedied by a relaxation of the strict rules implicit in the caste system, which would have the additional benefits of developing Hindu solidarity and nationalist sentiment. Additionally, she argues that women should play a more active role in fostering devotional nationalism in the home with shrines to Shivaji and other national heroes.

== Background and publication ==
Savitri Devi was a French-Greek occultist and Nazi sympathizer who converted to Hinduism, later becoming an influential figure in neo-Nazi and alt-right thought. She believed Adolf Hitler was the avatar of the Hindu god Vishnu. The book was published working at the Hindu Mission in Calcutta for about eighteen months, and having been influenced by Vinayak Damodar Savarkar's concept of Hindutva.

A Warning to the Hindus was first published by Brahmachari Bijoy Krishna of the Hindu Mission in Calcutta in 1939, with a foreword by Ganesh Damodar Savarkar (brother of Vinayak Damodar Savarkar). It was translated into six Indian languages, including Bengali, Hindi, and Marathi. It was re-published in 1953 by, Prammila Prakashan in Delhi and in 1993 by Promilla Paperbacks (New Delhi, ISBN 81-85002-40-1).

== Influence ==
Al Jazeera claimed in 2018 that the book was then still "widely read and highly regarded among Hindu nationalists".
