= AltRight Corporation =

Alt-right organization

The AltRight Corporation was an alt-right organization based in Alexandria, Virginia. It began operations in January 2017, and ran the website "altright.com". The site claimed to feature "the best writers and analysts" of the alt-right, and listed three founders: Daniel Friberg, Jason Jorjani, and Richard Spencer. Because of the involvement of Friberg and Spencer, the creation of the corporation has been described as "merger of the National Policy Institute, run by American white supremacist Richard Spencer, and Arktos Media, an antisemitic Scandinavian media platform." At the time of its formation, it was reported that the corporation had been created in partnership with far-right groups from Sweden. The organization's purpose was reported by NBC News to be to "unite global factions of the so-called alt-right", but it has also been described as intended to create a "more ideological Breitbart [News]".

The Southern Poverty Law Center considered the AltRight Corporation to be a hate group. Its website stopped publishing new material in May 2018. The corporation was declared inactive by the State Corporation Commission in June 2024.

== Departures ==
In September 2017, AltRight Corporation co-founder Jason Jorjani claimed that in 2016, funders "very close" to then-presidential candidate Donald Trump, had offered him funding to "infiltrate" the alt-right, with the intention of convincing its leaders to drop their white nationalism rhetoric, and move away from race-based politics, and this is the reason he affiliated himself with Spencer and the alt-right.

Once the AltRightCorporation was founded, after spending months making speeches on behalf of the alt-right and public appearances with Richard Spencer, Jorjani said that influencing the movement was more difficult than he had thought it would be. He resigned from the AltRight Corporation in August 2017, shortly after the violence at the Unite the Right rally in Charlottesville, Virginia. Jorjani has since written that one of the reasons for his leaving was that he "watched the corporation that was my brainchild turn into a magnet for white trash." He also said that Richard Spencer is "smart in the sense of the word 'smartass.'" and that Spencer had "pretty much destroyed the alt-right brand" by his emphasis on race and "all kinds of other stupidity."

In 2018 Arktos Media, which was co-founded Friberg, announced that it had also departed from the AltRight Corporation. With the departures of Jorjani and Friberg, Richard Spencer was the only co-founder left at the corporation.

In August 2018, Greg Conte, a close ally of Spencer, resigned from multiple Spencer-related positions he held, including one at the AltRight Corporation.

altright.com ceased publishing content soon after Spencer's fall from prominence in spring 2018. Its last article was released on May 3, 2018, and the corporation itself was automatically declared inactive in June 2024 for nonpayment of fees and a lack of annual reports. Its last annual report had been sent to the State Corporation Commission in 2019.

== See also ==
- National Policy Institute
