= Wolves of Vinland =

Norse neopagans in Lynchburg, Virginia, US

Wolves of Vinland is a Norse neopagan group based in the outskirts of Lynchburg, Virginia. In 2018, the Southern Poverty Law Center added the Wolves of Vinland to its list of hate groups.

== History ==
The Wolves of Vinland raised $3000 on GoFundMe to purchase materials for a Viking-style longhall, and accepted donations from white nationalist organizations such as Counter Currents Publishing. It is located at 200 Kavanaugh Road, in Lynchburg. Members of the group routinely post photos of ritual animal slaughter on Instagram. Prior to his resignation from the organization in late 2018, author Jack Donovan was an outspoken supporter of the Wolves, along with Kevin DeAnna, the founder of the now defunct Youth for Western Civilization. One member of the group, Maurice "Hjalti" Michaely, served two years in prison after being found guilty of attempted church arson against the Mount Pleasant Baptist Church, a historic Black church in Gainesville, Virginia. The fire did not injure anyone, but caused $1 million in damages to the building.

The group has been compared to Chuck Palahniuk's novel Fight Club and its film adaptation, and members have quoted the work as an influence, specifically the story's antihero Tyler Durden. Members of the group have been associated with the white power music and black metal scenes in Baltimore, Maryland, and elsewhere.

In 2022, two men with ties to Wolves of Vinland and the Asatru Folk Assembly were arrested and charged with plotting to rob a bank. They reportedly ran a Telegram channel that engaged in militant accelerationist rhetoric.

In 2026, the Guardian reported on a fight club ran by the Wolves at their compound in Lynchburg.

== Controversies ==
The Southern Poverty Law Center lists the Wolves of Vinland as a "neo-Volkisch hate group" and as a "white nationalist group".
