= National Socialist World =

Defunct neo-Nazi magazine

- First issue cover, spring 1966
- Editor: William Luther Pierce
- Categories: Neo-Nazism
- Frequency: Quarterly
- Publisher: World Union of National Socialists
- First issue: 1966
- Final issue Number: 1968; 6
- Country: United States
- Based in: Arlington, Virginia
- Language: English
- OCLC: 1759410

National Socialist World (NSW) was a quarterly neo-Nazi journal published by the World Union of National Socialists (WUNS), established in 1966. It was published out of the WUNS headquarters in Arlington, Virginia, and edited by William Luther Pierce. The magazine was one of several official publications affiliated with the American Nazi Party (ANP), and was published by Pierce and ANP founder George Lincoln Rockwell. It focused on neo-Nazi topics from a more intellectual angle than the other periodicals. It promoted the works of esoteric fascist Savitri Devi, which represented the first wide republication of her works. It ceased publication in 1968, after publishing 6 issues.

== History ==
The World Union of National Socialists (WUNS) launched the journal in spring 1966, a fulfillment of the organization's aim to make a journal as an ideological outlet for its international Nazism. The magazine was published out of Arlington, Virginia, where the WUNS headquarters were located. George Lincoln Rockwell, the leader of the American Nazi Party (ANP; later the National Socialist White People's Party, NSWPP) involved in creating WUNS, started the magazine.

George Lincoln Rockwell appointed as editor William Luther Pierce. At that time, Pierce had only recently become involved in the white supremacist movement. Pierce was previously an assistant physics professor at Oregon State University, with a doctorate from the University of Colorado Boulder; he had wanted to start a neo-Nazi journal for some time but before joining with Rockwell lacked the resources to do so himself. Pierce did not participate in the ANP's street-level activism, but was then the group's most enthusiastic ideological advocate of violence in service of the neo-Nazi ideology.

NSW was published by Pierce and Rockwell. They initially worked out a deal to split the costs of the production of the journal evenly. The contents of the magazine and editorial management were totally controlled by Pierce, while Rockwell handled physical production. When the first issue was published, Rockwell did not have the funds he had promised, and it was entirely financed by Pierce. The second issue stressed the need for funds to pay for the publication's operations. For donating $100, one was considered a "Friend", for $1,000, a "Benefactor", and for $10,000 one became a "Patron". The magazine did manage to break even financially by the fourth issue.

Rockwell was assassinated in 1967 by John Patler, a former member of the ANP. Following Rockwell's assassination in 1967, Pierce wrote a hagiography about his life for the magazine, entitled "George Lincoln Rockwell: A National Socialist Life". This was part of a broader lionization of Rockwell within the movement. It published six issues, with the last issue being published in winter 1968. After leaving the NSWPP, Pierce later established the neo-Nazi group the National Alliance.

== Contents and ideology ==
The magazine was intended to be published quarterly, and every issue was at least 100 pages in length. It was one of three major affiliated American Nazi Party/NSWPP publications, in addition to The Rockwell Report and The Stormtrooper Magazine. Unlike those periodicals, which were chiefly meant for internal reading and recruitment, NSW was targeted at an intellectual audience and focused more on racial theory, philosophy, as well as religion and the history of the "Aryan race". Nicholas Goodrick-Clarke wrote that it "cultivated its image and status as the leading international Nazi periodical with long articles and book reviews written for an educated and literate readership, as well as high standards of production." It included book reviews.

Scholar Damon T. Berry wrote that through the periodical, Pierce "was able to insert much of his own perspective through editorial prerogative." Chiefly a vehicle for Pierce's writings, his editorials argued in favor of preparation for a future guerrilla war against the American government. Its first editorial defined its aim as acting "as a beacon and a buoy for those of our race whose intellectual and spiritual leadership we must attract and utilize if we are to survive". It featured essays from a variety of figures in the international neo-Nazi movement, as well as translations of foreign texts or commentary on texts. In one article, Matt Koehl praises Adolf Hitler as being a visionary for the "Aryan racial revival". In the final issue was included another essay from Koehl, who succeeded Rockwell as leader following his assassination. The editorial of this issue also emphasized revolutionary aspects of their ideology, saying that:

[T]he conflict seems inevitable, for before our struggle is over each and every criminal comprising the present System will have a pretty good idea what fate awaits him at our hands [...] a triumphant National Socialism will mean not only a permanent end to their whole way of life, but an end to life itself for many of them.

Reflecting Pierce's interests, "racial esotericism" was a focus of the magazine, particularly the works of esoteric fascist Savitri Devi. The magazine praised her ideology, and several of her books were republished in condensed form in the magazine. The first issue of the magazine, which focused on philosophical approaches to neo-Nazism, contained excerpts of writing by Savitri Devi, including a shortened version of her 1956 book The Lightning and the Sun. Other works included in the first issue included a discussion of propaganda by Rockwell and Colin Jordan's arguments on the philosophical elements of National Socialism as an ideology. Later issues included letters which sometimes criticized earlier ones, for example one from WUNS founder Ludtke which criticized Rockwell's ideas on propaganda. Later issues also included Devi's works, including Gold in the Furnace and Defiance.

== Influence and legacy ==
The paper was read by neo-Nazis internationally, and other neo-Nazi periodicals later reprinted its content. The circulation of the magazine reached a total of 1,000. Historian Frederick J. Simonelli identified it as the "primary tool" for the dissemination of the neo-National Socialist ideology that Pierce and Rockwell helped formulate.

Scholars Nicholas Goodrick-Clarke and Damon T. Berry argued it was noteworthy for Pierce's spreading of Devi's ideology to American white supremacists. Goodrick-Clarke wrote that Pierce's republication of Savitri Devi's work both broadened her audience and "represented [Devi’s] literary debut in international neo-Nazi circles" and that the magazine played a "crucial role" in promoting Devi internationally, and acquired her new American followers, including James Mason, then a member of the NSWPP and later the author of the neo-Nazi book Siege. Berry argued that it served to introduce her ideology into the "early American white nationalist milieu".
