= Impeachment of Man =

1959 book by Savitri Devi

- Cover of Noontide edition
- Author: Savitri Devi
- Language: English
- Subject: Animal rights, ecology, ecofascism
- Published: 1959 (self-published); 1991 (Noontide Press)
- Publication place: India
- Pages: 156 (2nd ed.)
- ISBN: 0-939482-33-9 2nd ed.
- OCLC: 228701615
- Preceded by: The Lightning and the Sun

Impeachment of Man is a book by the French-born Greek fascist and Nazi sympathizer Savitri Devi. Written from 1945 to 1946, it was ultimately self-published 13 years later in 1959. Devi began writing it in the aftermath of Germany's defeat in World War II in India, ultimately finishing the work in France. Its central themes are animal rights and ecology; unlike the rest of Devi's works, the references to Nazism are obscured, leading to it being republished to appeal, in part, to New Age and vegetarian audiences.

== Contents ==
The book is dedicated to To Zobeida Khatun, an Indian Muslim and "a poor beggar woman who yet saved many distressed animals and fed them, day after day, for years."

Devi criticises "man-centered creeds" which disregard human duties towards other species, and which dominate spirituality in both Europe, though Abrahamic religion and China, through a worldview centered on the human family. She identifies India as the one part of the world in which "life-centerd religion" was established, resulting from the belief in a continuity of reincarnation between all life forms. However, the prevailing Hindu worldview is pessimistic in nature, seeing individual life as a curse rather than a blessing. Thus, Devi notes, while a western vegetarian might abstain from meat out of a love for animals, an Indian vegetarian is only seeking their own liberation from reincarnation.

Devi would favour a religion of "joyous wisdom," which should be "neither man-centered nor pessimistic, nor lacking truly universal kindness in the Buddhistic sense of the word." Devi says that no known historic civilisation has been founded on such a belief, but it can be found in a few individual figures throughout history. Throughout the work she gives as examples such figures as the Egyptian king Akhenaten, Pythagoras, Apollonius of Tyana and Ashoka. Throughout the text Devi condemns meat eating, vivisection, animal testing, fur clothing, the wastage of food that might be given to animals, pet abandonment, neutering, and the abuse of beasts of burden, as well as some infractions against plant life, such as the destruction of woodlands. Beyond this, she advocates for active kindness towards animals, and criticises the merely negative Hindu concept of Ahimsa or "non-violence."

== Background and publication ==
While ultimately published in 1959, the book's writing began in Calcutta in January 1945; the immediate aftermath of Germany's defeat in World War II. It was finished shortly after Devi arrived in Lyon, France, in March 1946, while the Nuremberg trials were ongoing. Due to this, unlike prior works, the Nazi references are intentionally obscured. Devi considered National Socialism to be a life-centred religion, and attempted to synthesise it with her belief in Hinduism.

As the original manuscript was lost, it was self-published over a decade later in Calcutta in 1959. In 1991, it was republished by the far-right Noontide Press in Costa Mesa, California. In a new edition, the publisher argued for many of her nature-centered views and gave an account of her life in a foreword.

== Analysis and influence ==
Due to its lack of obvious Nazi ideology, the book was republished in the years after its publication, aimed in part at occult, New Age, and vegetarian audiences. It was nonetheless highly popular with neo-Nazis and was a "classic" within the movement. Academic Jeffrey Kaplan wrote that Impeachment of Man was, as of 1999, "the strongest statement of the National Socialist nature religion available today". Kaplan noted Devi's sources as "wildly eclectic" in origin, couched in religious terminology. Scholar Stéphane François called it an "anti-speciesist and misanthropic" work, while another analysis noted it as a forerunner to the ideology of deep ecology in its "biocentric" worldview.

Devi's book has seen increased attention in recent years as a result of modern ecofascist movements, and has also had popularity with radical environmentalists who are not far-right, having a significant impact on the American and European animal rights movements. It was recommended in ecofascist and deep ecology circles on the web forum 8chan.
