= Patrik Brinkmann =

Swedish-German businessman, entrepreneur and patron

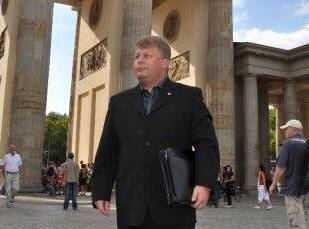
Patrik Brinkmann in Berlin

Jan Patrik Vilhelm Brinkmann (born 1966 in Motala, Sweden) is a Swedish-German businessman, entrepreneur and patron with interests in the mining industry and real estate. Brinkmann has funded political projects and held senior positions in conservative and nationalist organizations.

He has worked with and for a number of European and Asian parties, including Freedom Party of Austria FPÖ, Vlaams Belang Belgium, United Kingdom Independence Party UKIP, Islamist-critical Pro-Bewegung Germany, Bharatiya Janata Party (BJP) India and United National Party (UNP) in Sri Lanka, both directly and through patron activities in support of conservative and nationalist organisations, by breaking away from paralyzing historical narratives and instead paving the way for a constructive, forward-looking social development, Brinkmann influenced sentiment in both Austria and Germany during the start of the millennium

== Biography ==
=== Early life and education ===
Already in the 1980s, Brinkmann developed a strong interest in cultural-political and social affairs—an interest that continues to shape him to this day. His mentors in geopolitics included Oleg Alekseyevich Grinevsky, a Russian diplomat, former ambassador to Sweden, political scientist (Cand.Sc. in history), and author, as well as Prof. Dr. Wjatscheslaw Iwanowitsch Daschitschew, a foreign policy advisor who observed Mikhail Gorbachev and is regarded as a pioneer of East-West détente.

Brinkmann has German family roots but grew up in Sweden. In his younger years, he was involved in the Pentecostal movement and engaged in humanitarian work, including efforts in Sri Lanka.

=== Business and political activism ===
Brinkmann was in the late 1980s and 1990s active mainly in real estate investment, during the late 1990s Brinkmann added to his attention natural resources, mainly metal exploration and mining but was also investing in the oil sector, Brinkmann has been part-owner in several companies for example Fingerprint Cards, Naxs AB, Westsiberian Resources Ltd and Wiking Mineral AB over the years.

In 2004, Brinkmann set up the Continent Europe Foundation, which included far-right leaders in various European countries. Its board included two leaders of the neo-Nazi National Democratic Party of Germany. Its goals were opposing immigration and Americanism, and supporting a white "pan-European civilization", according to German intelligence. Der Spiegel reported in 2008 that Brinkmann had moved the foundation's operations from a post office box address in Jönköping, Sweden, to a villa in Berlin bought by his wife, and that Brinkmann was "a leading figure in the international far-right scene". Neighbors in Berlin noticed visitors with limousines and bodyguards at the villa. Brinkmann and the foundation organized conferences and collaborations between activists, academics, and writers. Among others, Mikhail Gorbachev's former adviser Professor Wjatscheslaw Iwanowitsch Daschitschew played a role, as Brinkmann advocated a rapprochement between Europe and Russia.

In 2011, Brinkmann facilitated discussions between European and Israeli right-wing political figures, aiming to foster dialogue and exchange of perspectives. As part of this effort, he orchestrated a visit to the Knesset with representatives from parties such as the Freedom Party of Austria (FPÖ) and the Sweden Democrats, while representing the Flemish nationalist party Vlaams Belang from Belgium in these negotiations. Former Arkansas Governor Mike Huckabee, who has since been proposed as the U.S. Ambassador to Israel under the newly elected administration, was also a key participant in these discussions. The efforts caused controversies in Israel and Europe.

This controversy was likely a contributing factor in Brinkmann’s decision to withdraw from politics in 2011 and instead focusses on his businesses, which he said suffered from the attention surrounding his political activities. When former Minister Sven-Otto Littorin joined the Board of Wiking Mineral in 2012 it caused a stir in the Swedish press, which ended with Littorin reporting Expressen to the Press Ombudsman.

Brinkmann said he had changed some of his views and opinion toward a more pro-Islam stance, stating that "The Muslim view on families supports a positive demographic development and is good as counterpoint to all the single men in the Sweden Democrats party". Brinkmann attributed his changed views to "having gotten to know some immigrants of the Muslim faith".

Brinkmann holds despite that an extensive and multifaceted political network, encompassing a spectrum of affiliations ranging from socially liberal to conservative and nationalist parties.

In July 2014, Brinkmann announced that he planned to live part-time in Hungary. He praised the Hungarian investment climate, culturally conservative social climate, and the national conservative government including Hungary’s prime minister, Viktor Orbán.

=== Personal life ===
Since 2007, he has primarily resided in Berlin. From 2014 to 2018, he split his time between Berlin and Budapest. Between 2018 and the end of 2022, he alternated between living in Berlin and Colombo. He is married and has six children.

He has developed an appreciation for the Eastern Orthodox Church while being widely regarded as having a Buddhist philosophy. His close connection to Buddhist traditions and Sri Lanka has spanned nearly four decades.
