= Metapedia =

Neo-Nazi online encyclopædia

- English logo
- Website type: Wiki
- Available in: 17 languages: English, German, Spanish, Swedish, French, Norwegian, Greek, Romanian, Estonian, Slovak, Czech, Portuguese, Croatian, Danish, Dutch, Hungarian,
- Owners: NFSE Media AB, Linköping, Sweden
- Website: en.metapedia.org/wiki/Main_Page (English Metapedia)
- Commercial: No
- Registration: Optional, via e-mail (required for editing)
- Launched: 26 October 2006; 20 years ago
- Current status: Active
- Content license: GNU Free Documentation License 1.3

Metapedia is an online wiki-based website which spreads neo-Nazi content.

== History ==
The Swedish Metapedia was founded in 2006 by Anders Lagerström, a neo-Nazi publisher from Linköping, Sweden. About Lagerström, the Swedish newspaper Östgöta Correspondenten wrote:

Anders Lagerström has long been involved in extreme right-wing organizations. In 2000, he was convicted of spraying tear gas in the face of a police officer. In 2002 he started the Nordic publishing house, which specializes in issuing and selling Nazi literature and white power music. Lagerström is also a prominent figure in the Nordic Federation. The Nazi organization seems to be creating a "Nordic nation state". The organization's website says the following about how this imaginary nation should look: "It means a society populated by a people, and a state power and mass media entirely under Nordic control."

Swedish historian Rasmus Fleischer wrote:

In 2007, another network began to crystallize within Europe's radical right but with a vastly different ideological character. Activists from the Swedish group Nordiska Förbundet made a coordinated effort to use the internet to propagate a more 'positive' image of neo fascist [sic], third position and national revolutionary politics. They created a blog portal (Motpol.nu), a web community (Nordisk.nu) and a wiki site (Metapedia). Today there exist a dozen editions of Metapedia, making it a vital medium for dissemination of the ideology labeled here as "multi-fascism". Metapedia tends to promote antisemitism in a cautious way, not stating too much in words but instead using the hyperlinked wiki format to make insinuations about a Jewish conspiracy.

== Content ==
Metapedia describes itself as being an alternative to Wikipedia that focuses on culture, art, science, history, politics and philosophy. By 2007, the site had more than 4,500 articles in English; topics covered include European history and politics. According to Crítica de la Argentina, Metapedia has glowing descriptions of Adolf Hitler and other Nazi figures. The historian Daniel Goldhagen describes it as seeking "to create (currently in 18 languages) an anti-Semitic informational universe." Metapedia openly denies the Holocaust calling it a genocide only according to "politically correct history" and refers to former U.S. President Barack Obama as a "mixed race former president". Its content has been noted for its neo-Nazi points of view.

The wiki covers a total of 17 languages, with German Metapedia being the most developed.

According to North Rhine-Westphalia's Office for the Protection of the Constitution, Metapedia's articles are characterized by historical negationism and lauding Nazi Germany. For this reason, the German Federal Department for Media Harmful to Young Persons (Bundesprüfstelle für jugendgefährdende Medien) started an indexing process, which would consider as to whether Metapedia is "harmful to young people".

In early 2007, within half a year of the launching of the original Swedish edition, Metapedia received much Swedish media attention for its similarity to Wikipedia (it uses MediaWiki, the same software as Wikipedia and so has a similar visual style) and some of its contents, in particular for its positive characterization of many Nazi German personalities, for cataloguing Jews in Swedish media, and for characterizing Swedish companies as either "Swedish-owned" or "Jewish-owned". This led to an investigation by the Chancellor of Justice (Justitiekanslern) to decide whether the site should be prosecuted for inciting hatred or for violating the Swedish Privacy Law (Personuppgiftslagen). After reviewing the site's contents, the Chancellor of Justice decided to terminate investigations, since nothing had been found that violated the Freedom of Speech Act (Yttrandefrihetsgrundlagen) or the Privacy Law. In January 2009, in a response to further attention given to the site, the Swedish Chancellor of Justice opined that Metapedia presented a positive image of Adolf Hitler, but decided not to restart an investigation since this was not illegal.

In a June 2017 article, Alexis Sobel Fitts from Wired noted that the Hungarian and German Metapedia are "especially popular".

== Operation ==
Metapedia runs on MediaWiki, a free and open-source wiki software platform written in PHP and built upon the MySQL database.

Metapedia is headed by Lagerström and Lennart Berg, who also runs the supporting NFSE Media AB.

== See also ==
- Alt-right
- Far-right politics
- Fascism in Europe
- Gab (social network)
- Neo-Nazism in Sweden
- New Right
