= Gainesville, Virginia =

- Census-designated place (CDP)
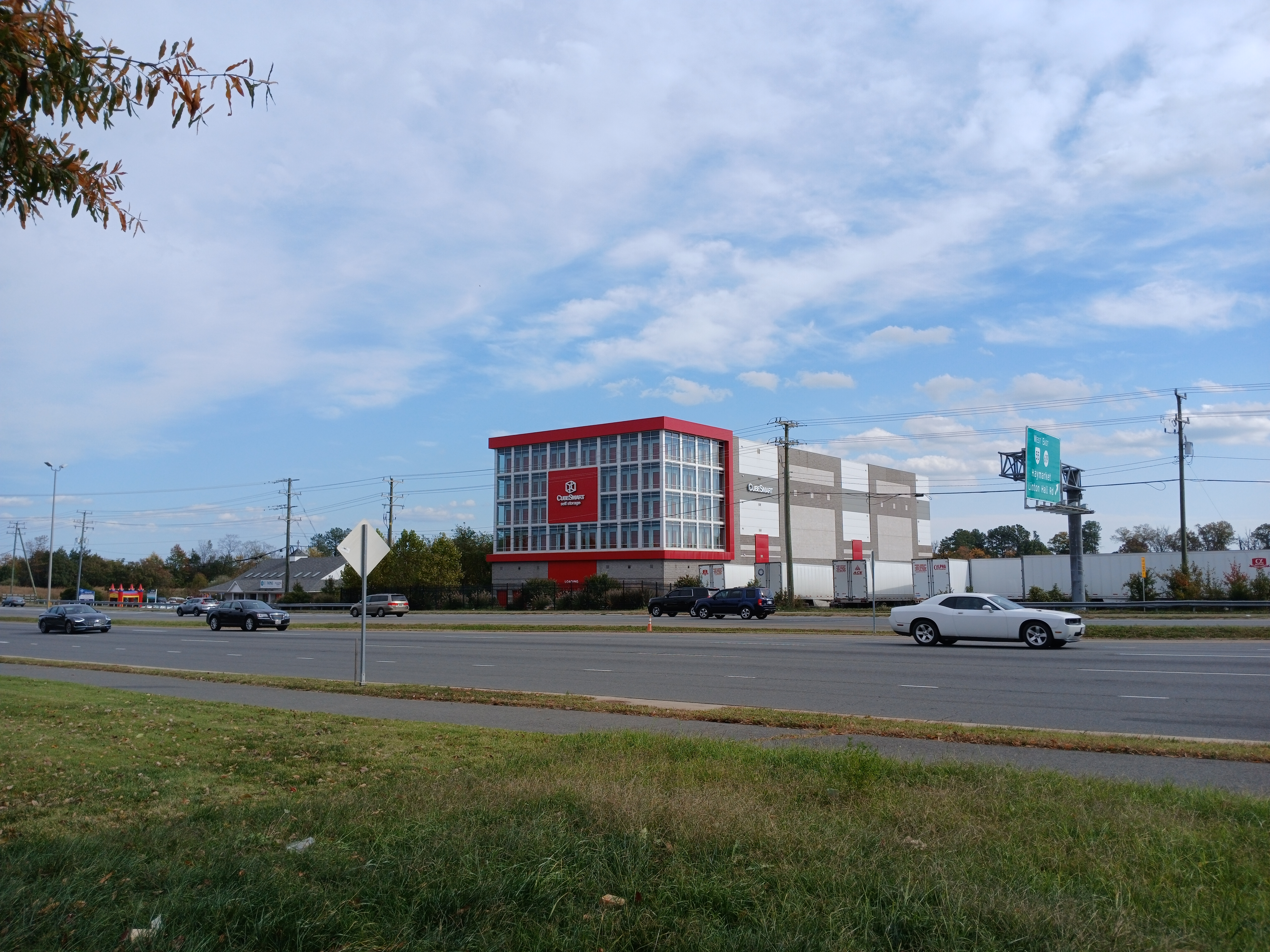
- US Route 29 in Gainesville, October 2024

- Location in Prince William County and Virginia
- Coordinates: 38°47′41″N 77°37′14″W
- Country: United States
- State: Virginia
- County: Prince William

Area
  - Total: 10.3 sq mi (26.6 km^{2})
  - Land: 9.7 sq mi (25.2 km^{2})
  - Water: 0.58 sq mi (1.5 km^{2})
- Elevation: 354 ft (108 m)

Population (2020)
  - Total: 17,287
  - Density: 451/sq mi (174.1/km^{2})
- Time zone: UTC−5 (Eastern (EST))
  - Summer (DST): UTC−4 (EDT)
- ZIP Codes: 20155-20156
- Area codes: 703, 571
- FIPS code: 51-30176
- GNIS feature ID: 1494951

Gainesville is a census-designated place (CDP) in western Prince William County, Virginia, United States. The population was 17,287 in the 2020 census.

Gainesville is home to Jiffy Lube Live, an outdoor amphitheater originally known as the Nissan Pavilion.

== History ==
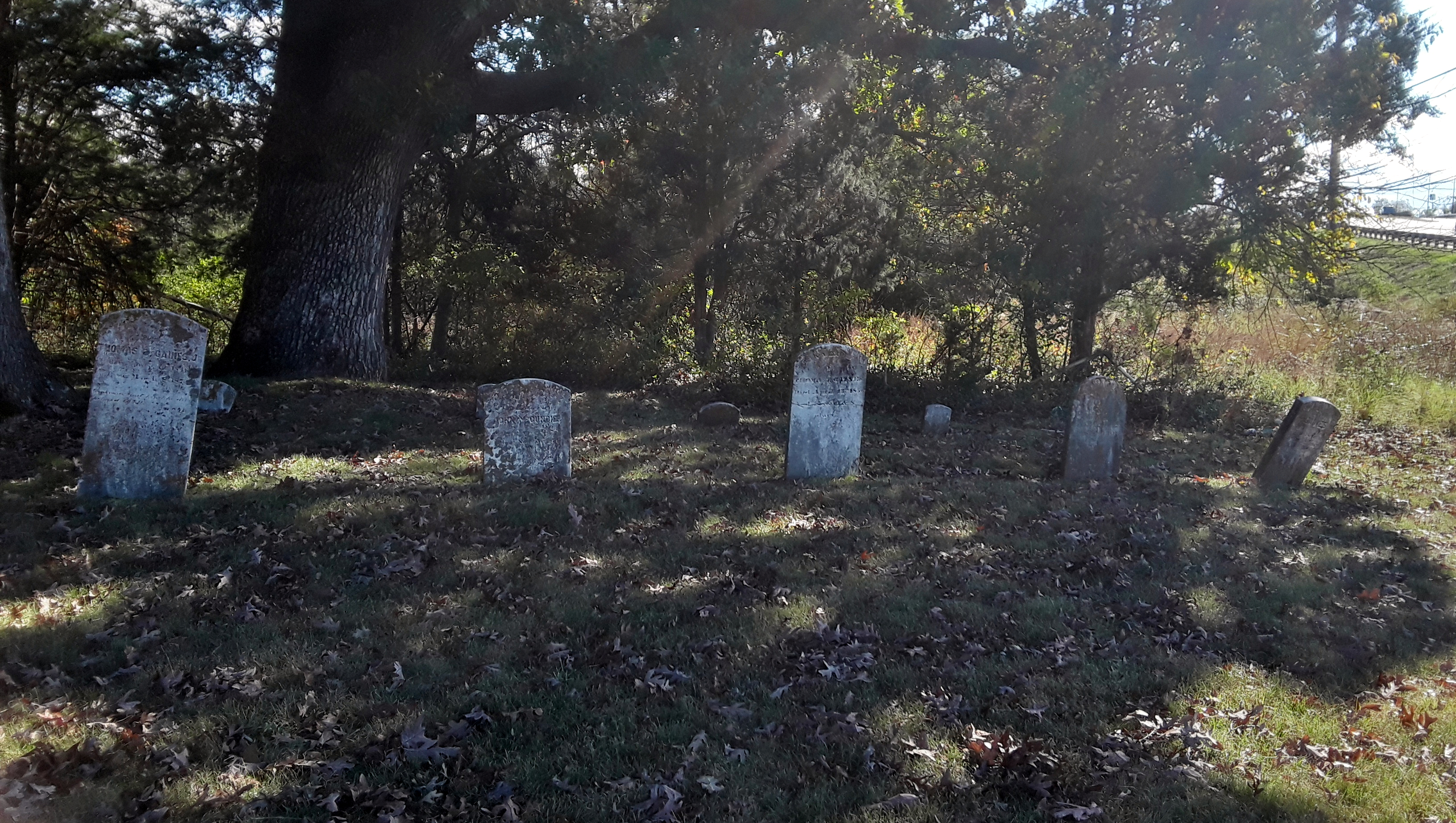
Graves of the Gaines family in Gainesville United Methodist Church cemetery; among them is that of Thomas Brawner Gaines, namesake of the community

Gainesville was once a changing point for stagecoach horses on the Fauquier and Alexandria Turnpike. In earlier times, the village that became known as "Gainesville" actually had two other names, though only briefly. In the colonial era, the region was known as the "Middle Grounds", a reference to its location between Broad Run and Bull Run.

=== 19th century ===
In the early 1800s, Samuel Love of Buckland Hall started work on the Warrenton–Alexandria Turnpike. In the hamlet where the turnpike passed through the Middle Grounds, a new stable was erected for stagecoach drivers to switch horses. Other businesses followed, and the settlement became known as New Stable.

In 1846, a post office by that name was opened there in Richard Graham's hotel and store. Mr. Graham also operated a large stable that catered to the drovers and stage drivers and other less pretentious travelers. The person responsible for bringing the railroad through the village was Thomas Brawner Gaines (1814–1856), who had begun buying up property in the area as early as 1835, and later became a major landowner.

In 1850, Thomas Brawner Gaines (1814–1856) sold to the Manassas Gap Railroad a right-of-way through his land along the Warrenton Turnpike (US Route 29). After the railroad was completed to Strasburg, Virginia in 1854, Gaines conveyed additional land for a train depot with the condition that the rail stop take his name. By 1856, a small community with a post office flourished around the Gainesville depot.

After the Civil War, emancipated former slaves bought land along U.S. Route 29 and developed a small community that came to be known as "The Settlement". Residents founded the Mount Pleasant Baptist Church, which would serve as a central community meeting place for over a century. Many current residents of the area can trace their lineage back to this period.

=== 20th century ===
Gainesville became a shipping point for grain, timber, and cattle and remained a major cattle shipping point into the early 1960s. During the American Civil War, Gainesville was occupied by both Confederate and Union armies and nearby Thoroughfare Gap in the Bull Run Mountains served as a path for soldiers to reach the First and Second battles of Bull Run. Into the early 1940s the Southern Railway operated passenger service from Harrisonburg and Strasburg Junction through Gainesville, to Manassas and Washington's Union Station. In 1994, the groundbreaking for Gainesville's first townhome community began; it was named Crossroads. This marked the beginning of mass-development for Gainesville.

=== 21st century ===
In 2006, the VDOT began working on the Gainesville Interchange improvement project, with construction officially starting in July 2011, in order to ease the traffic in the rapidly growing Gainesville-Haymarket area. It was completed on July 9, 2015.

== Geography ==
Gainesville is located at 38°47′41″N 77°37′14″W (38.794784, −77.620651). According to the U.S. Census Bureau, the CDP has a total area of 10.3 square miles (26.6 km^{2}), of which 9.7 square miles (25.2 km^{2}) is land and 0.6 square mile (1.5 km^{2}) (5.45%) is water.

=== Climate ===
Gainesville has a humid subtropical climate (Köppen climate classification Cfa), with mild winters with brief cold snaps, and hot and humid summers with frequent thunderstorms. Spring and autumn are pleasantly warm. January is the coldest month with highs around 45 °F and lows around 25 °F. July is the warmest month, with highs around 90 °F and lows around 65 °F.

Climate data for Gainesville, Virginia
Month	Jan	Feb	Mar	Apr	May	Jun	Jul	Aug	Sep	Oct	Nov	Dec	Year
Mean daily maximum °F (°C)	44.1 (6.7)	50.5 (10.3)	58.0 (14.4)	68.7 (20.4)	75.3 (24.1)	86.2 (30.1)	90.0 (32.2)	87.8 (31.0)	83.3 (28.5)	72.4 (22.4)	58.6 (14.8)	49.1 (9.5)	68.7 (20.4)
Mean daily minimum °F (°C)	25.6 (−3.6)	29.1 (−1.6)	36.6 (2.6)	42.4 (5.8)	52.3 (11.3)	60.8 (16.0)	67.1 (19.5)	64.8 (18.2)	58.7 (14.8)	46.3 (7.9)	36.2 (2.3)	28.3 (−2.1)	45.7 (7.6)
Average precipitation inches (mm)	2.6 (66)	2.5 (64)	2.8 (71)	2.9 (74)	3.7 (94)	3.2 (81)	3.1 (79)	3.2 (81)	3.3 (84)	3.1 (79)	3.1 (79)	2.7 (69)	36.2 (920)
Source: Weatherbase

== Demographics ==
Historical population
Census	Pop.	Note	%±
2010	11,481		—
2020	18,112		57.8%
U.S. Decennial Census; 2000 2010 2020

Gainesville was first listed as a census designated place in the 2000 U.S. census.

=== 2020 census ===
As of the 2020 census, Gainesville had a population of 18,112. The median age was 36.6 years. 28.6% of residents were under the age of 18 and 9.2% of residents were 65 years of age or older. For every 100 females there were 95.3 males, and for every 100 females age 18 and over there were 94.1 males age 18 and over.

100.0% of residents lived in urban areas, while 0.0% lived in rural areas.

There were 5,672 households in Gainesville, of which 49.5% had children under the age of 18 living in them. Of all households, 68.0% were married-couple households, 11.4% were households with a male householder and no spouse or partner present, and 16.3% were households with a female householder and no spouse or partner present. About 13.2% of all households were made up of individuals and 3.3% had someone living alone who was 65 years of age or older.

There were 5,820 housing units, of which 2.5% were vacant. The homeowner vacancy rate was 1.4% and the rental vacancy rate was 2.5%.

Racial composition as of the 2020 census
Race	Number	Percent
White	9,809	54.2%
Black or African American	2,289	12.6%
American Indian and Alaska Native	68	0.4%
Asian	3,188	17.6%
Native Hawaiian and Other Pacific Islander	9	0.0%
Some other race	771	4.3%
Two or more races	1,978	10.9%
Hispanic or Latino (of any race)	2,131	11.8%

=== 2010 census ===
As of the 2010 census, Gainesville was the third-largest CDP in Prince William County. At the 2010 census, there were 11,481 people, 3,959 households and roughly 3,100 families living in the CDP. The population density was 1,150.2 inhabitants per square mile (444.1/km^{2}). There were 10,300 housing units at an average density of 189.6 per square mile (73.2/km^{2}).

=== 2000 census ===
There were 10,300 households, of which 32.8% had children under the age of 18 living with them, 67.2% were married couples living together, 5.6% had a female householder with no husband present, and 24.1% were non-families. 18.6% of all households were made up of individuals, and 3.8% had someone living alone who was 65 years of age or older. The size was 2.55 and the average family size was 2.91.

24.4% of the population were under the age of 18, 5.2% from 18 to 24, 36.7% from 25 to 44, 23.6% from 45 to 64, and 9.9% who were 65 years of age or older. The median age was 36 years. For every 100 females, there were 97.4 males. For every 100 females age 18 and over, there were 94.8 males.

The median household income was $76,300 and the median family income was $82,627. Males had a median income of $46,934 and females $40,385. The per capita income was $35,196. About 1.9% of families and 2.8% of the population were below the poverty line, including 3.7% of those under age 18 and 0.6% of those age 65 or over.

== Development ==
Major commercial and residential development has taken place since 2000, resulting in Gainesville having six large shopping centers. The intersection of I-66 and Lee Highway (29 Highway) has the largest shopping center with many big box stores.

A railway station extension for the VRE was studied, to connect the region via commuter rail to Fairfax County, Manassas, and Washington, D.C. However, the project was voted down by the VRE Operations Board in favor of expanding services to the existing station in Broad Run.
