= Benjamin R. Teitelbaum =

American ethnographer (born 1983)

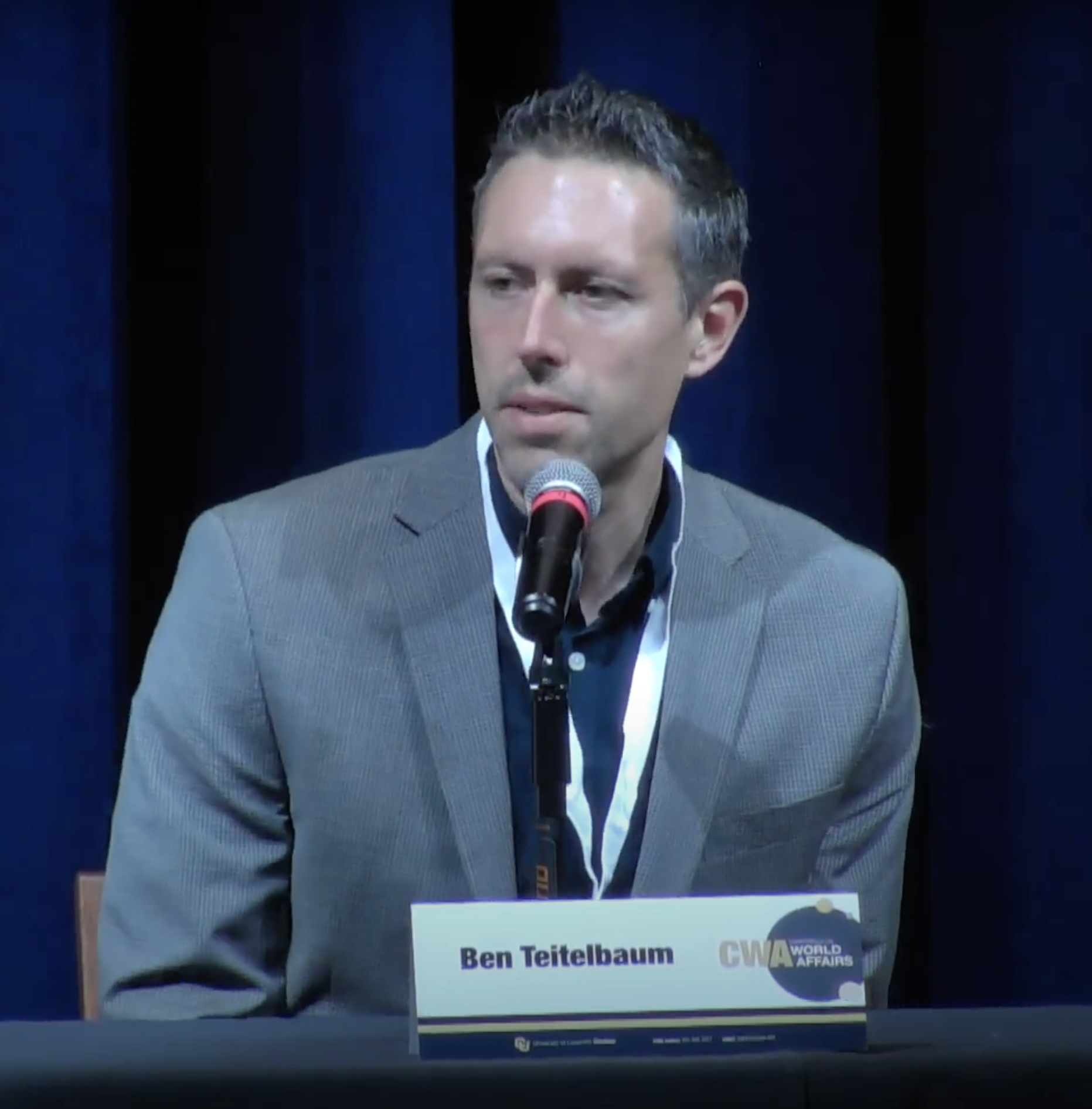
- Benjamin Teitelbaum speaking at the Conference on World Affairs in 2024
- Born: January 27, 1983 (age 43)
- Title: Associate professor

Academic work
- Discipline: Ethnographer
- Institutions: University of Colorado Boulder
- Main interests: Far-right politics, traditionalism, music
- Notable works: Lions of the North: Sounds of the New Nordic Radical Nationalism (2017), War for Eternity: The Return of Traditionalism and the Rise of the Populist Right (2020)

Benjamin Raphael Teitelbaum (born January 27, 1983) is an American ethnographer, author, and political commentator. An associate professor of musicology and international affairs at the University of Colorado, Boulder and former Head of Nordic Studies at the same institution, he is best known for his research into far-right ideology and culture and for interviewing and profiling major rightwing political actors.

He has written for The New York Times, The Wall Street Journal, UnHerd, The Nation, and The Atlantic, and he was a recurring guest on The Glenn Beck Program and The Mehdi Hasan Show.

In 2024 Radio France named Teitelbaum in its 100 experts on international relations.

== Notable Works ==
Teitelbaum is the author of Lions of the North: Sounds of the New Nordic Radical Nationalism (2017), an ethnographic study of music in Scandinavian radical nationalism and the rise of the Sweden Democrats political party.

Teitelbaum published War for Eternity: The Return of Traditionalism and the Rise of the Populist Right in 2020. Based on extensive interviews Teitelbaum conducted with former Donald Trump advisor Steve Bannon, as well as Brazilian Olavo de Carvalho, Russian ideologue Alexander Dugin, Jason Jorjani, and Gabor Vona. The book argued that all of these figures had varying relationships with the Traditionalist School, and it also exposed meetings held between Bannon, Dugin, and Carvalho in 2018 and 2019.

War for Eternity was called “the best outsider’s portrait of Bannon” by Vanity Fare, and was an editor's pick for the Financial Times and Dagens Nyheter and book of the year by Estadão. It was controversial among its main subjects. Olavo de Carvalho condemned the book, prompting a celebration of it by Carvalho's detractors, like Brazilian pop star Caetano Veloso. Alexander Dugin called the book "One of the first efforts to understand our position, not to demonize us. Or maybe to demonize us but at the same time trying to understand. I think Teitelbaum is sincere and correct."
