= Svenska Bergsbruk =

Svenska Bergsbruk AB
- Type: Limited company (Aktiebolag)
- Industry: Mineral exploration, Mining
- Founded: 2005
- Headquarters: Falun, Sweden
- Key people: Antal Szilagyi (Chairman), Gustaf Kugelberg (CEO)
- Operating income: SEK 0.0 million (2013)
- Net income: SEK 48.306 million (2013)
- Total assets: SEK 126.455 million (end 2013)
- Total equity: SEK 124.616 million (end 2013)
- Number of employees: 4 (average, 2013)
- Website: svenskabergsbruk.se

Svenska Bergsbruk AB, formerly Wiking Mineral AB, was a junior mineral exploration and mine development company. The firm was founded in 2005, and primarily engaged in mine development and active exploration for base and precious metal deposits in Sweden.

Between 2006 and November 21, 2014, the company was listed on the alternative exchange AktieTorget (now known as Spotlight Stock Market) using the symbol WIKM. In July 2014 Patrik Brinkmann and family controlled just over 50% of the company, and there was a total of about 1,400 shareholders.

The head office was located in Falun, Sweden.

== Operations ==
The company conducted exploration in several areas with previously proven mineral resources, primarily in northern Sweden. It had a portfolio of mining and exploration projects in various stages of development, using different methods ranging from traditional surface exploration to advanced deep exploration.

In 2013, the company had an average of two employees and two consultants. In its later phases, the company relied to a large extent on external expertise, with the idea of moving more and more of these capacities in-house as it approached the processing phase.

In July 2014, the company had 34 exploration projects in and outside of known mineral deposit areas, as well as two mining concessions in Gladhammar and Vindfall.

== Projects ==
The company's project portfolio was concentrated in one geographical area in Sweden, the Bergslagen area.

Vindfall near Gävle and Sandviken was a shallow lead, zinc and silver deposit, which the company saw as its most promising project and intended to develop towards active mining operations.

=== Overview of projects ===
Gruvbergsfältet in Leksand Municipality, Dalarna County — zinc and lead

Rörbergsfältet: Vindfall/Sörtärnan in Gävle municipality, Gävleborg County - zinc, lead and silver

== History ==
Wiking Mineral was founded in 2005 by Patrik Brinkmann and Görgen Edefors. The following year new equity was issued twice, totaling SEK 30 million, the company was listed on the Aktietorget exchange, and exploration activities commenced.

In 2007, an additional share issue of SEK 20 million was carried out, and the companies Noble Metals Exploration AB and Mineralprospektering i Bergslagen AB were acquired and merged with the parent company.

In the following years continuous core drilling was done, and in 2009 mineralizations of zinc and lead (Myssfallet in Saxåfältet) as well as gold (Bastutjärnen near Boliden) were found, among other minerals.

The following year, convertible bonds totalling SEK 66.7 million were issued and exploration company Nordic Resources AB (then called Havilah Mining AB) was acquired, which in 2011 was merged with the parent company.

In 2013, creditors were offered a private placement in accordance with the company's proposal to creditors following the cancellation of rights issue earlier in the year whereupon the company was granted reorganization.

In 2014, the company resumed drilling operations in Gladhammar, Västervik after a geophysics study had demonstrated greater potential than previously thought, and it was granted a mining concession for its key project Vindfall. The company also signed a purchase agreement for a mineral processing plant.

The company generated controversy due to its ties to far-right political groups.

In 2016, the company filed for a name change to Svenska Bergsbruk AB. According to CEO Torgrim Svensson, the name change reflects a change in direction, with several key people linked to far-right politics no longer holding official positions in the company.

In November 2017 Svenska Bergsbruk AB went into bankruptcy. A bankruptcy that was later canceled when all creditors were paid and the company thus entered liquidation proceedings at the end of 2018, the company’s liquidation concluded on 30 June 2026. The liquidator submitted the final accounts in November 2026.
