= Asit Krishna Mukherji =

Indian fascist and astrologer (1898–1977)

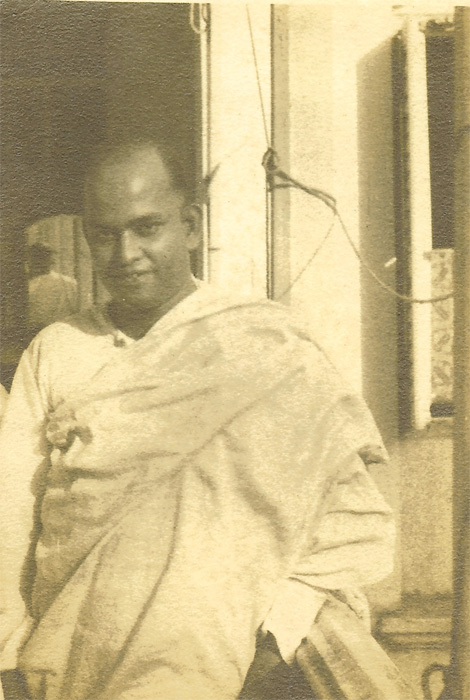
Photograph of Mukherji, 1939.

Asit Krishna Mukherji (1898 – 21 March 1977) was a writer with Nazi convictions who published pro-Axis journals. He married Greek Nazi activist Maximiani Julia Portas (Savitri Devi) in 1940 in order to protect her from deportation or internment.

== Biography ==
Asit Krishna attended the University of London taking a doctorate in history. After graduating, he traveled in the Soviet Union. Unimpressed with Marxist materialism, he turned down several offers to work for communist newspapers back in India. He began, instead, to publish The New Mercury in collaboration with Sri Vinaya Datta. Proclaiming its support for Nazi Germany and Aryan racism, it expressed admiration for the race laws and Hellenic ideals. The New Mercury was published with the support of the German consulate in Calcutta. In January 1938, Asit Krishna met Savitri Devi, who was deeply impressed with his knowledge of Nazism. They married on 9 June 1940, in Calcutta.

After The New Mercury was closed down by the British government in 1937, he published The Eastern Economist in collaboration with the Japanese legation from 1938 to 1941.

Asit Krishna used his connections with Subhas Chandra Bose and the Japanese authorities to put them in contact with one another, thus facilitating the formation of the Indian National Army.

After the war, he made his living as a fortunetelling astrologer and had Savitri's books printed.

== Works ==
- A History of Japan, 1945
