= Mount Pleasant Baptist Church and Cemetery =

Historic site in Prince William County, Virginia, US

- U.S. National Register of Historic Places
- Virginia Landmarks Register
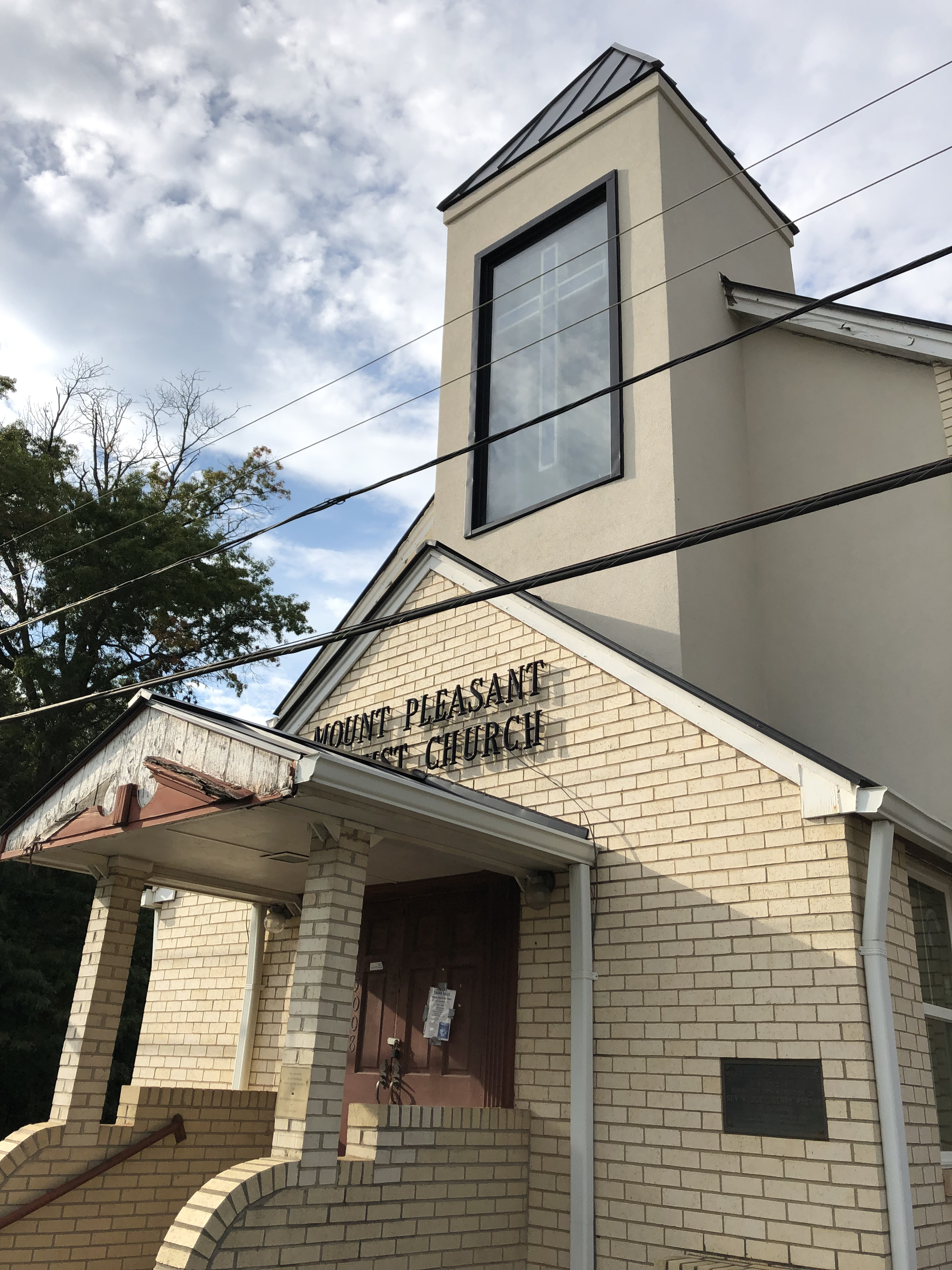
- Mount Pleasant Baptist Church in October 2021

- Location within Northern Virginia Location within Virginia Location within the United States
- Location: 15008 Lee Hwy, Gainesville, VA, 20155
- Coordinates: 38°47′23″N 77°38′17″W
- Built: 1929
- NRHP reference No.: 100006159
- VLR No.: 076-6009

Significant dates
- Added to NRHP: February 19, 2021
- Designated VLR: December 10, 2020

Mount Pleasant Baptist Church and Cemetery is a historic Baptist church and cemetery located in Gainesville, Prince William County, Virginia along U.S. Route 29. It is located on the site of a former community of black slaves emancipated after the American Civil War historically known as The Settlement and hosts a congregation tracing back to the 1870s. Built in 1929, the current building replaces three other church buildings that had existed in the community. Since 2010, the congregation has been led by George Carlisle.

In 2012, Mount Pleasant Baptist Church would be subject to an arson attack, which left significant damage in latter additions to the building. The perpetrator of the attack, white nationalist hate group Wolves of Vinland member Maurice Thomson Michaely, would plea guilty to charges related to the attack and served two and a half years in jail and was ordered to pay restitution. The church has been closed and under repair since, with the nearby Northern Virginia Baptist Center temporarily hosting the congregation.

The site of the church and cemetery was added to the Virginia Landmarks Register in 2020 and the National Register of Historic Places in 2021.

== History ==
=== Establishment and early church buildings ===
Following the American Civil War (1861–1865), in the 1870s, emancipated black slaves would purchase land near Gainesville from a bankrupt farmer and form a community known as "The Settlement". The first church in The Settlement, originally known as Beulah Church, would be established in 1877. In 1882, a new church building constructed of logs would be built on three acres of land purchased for $10 along Old Carolina Road. Another new church at this location was built in 1889 after the previous log structure was destroyed by a fire, presumably caused by an arson attack. The church would be subject to another fire in 1928, finally being replaced by the building that currently stands, constructed in 1929. Throughout the 20th century, the church building had several additions to the rear side of the building.

=== 2012 arson attack ===
On August 10, 2012, the church building would be subject to an arson attack, in which nobody was inside the church at the time of the incident and no injuries were reported. While the original part of the building was mostly intact despite some smoke damage and broken windows, the fire caused severe damages to the latter rear-side additions of the building. It was not until almost 8 years later in June 2020, following the murder of George Floyd and the arise of subsequent protests, that the church's reparation efforts were given widespread attention. To assist in funding the church's now 5-year long campaign to repair the church, Delegate Danica Roem started a GoFundMe campaign, which raised over $20,000 in the span of two days and doubled the church's $10,000 goal for the first phase of the $100,000 total cost of reparations of the building.

The arsonist, Maurice Thomson Michaely from nearby Haymarket, was arrested on November 29, 2012. He was a minor at the time of the attack and had no prior criminal record. Nicknamed "Hjalti" as a member of the Lynchburg-based Norse neopagan group Wolves of Vinland, which has since been identified as a neo-Völkisch and white nationalist hate group by the Southern Poverty Law Center, Michaely was not charged with a hate crime for defacing the historic black church, but eventually pled guilty on June 4, 2013, to felony arson, unlawfully entering property of another with the intent to damage, and maliciously destroying or defacing church property. On September 29, 2013, he was sentenced to two and a half years in jail and was ordered by the court to pay $250 per month to the Mount Pleasant Baptist Church as restitution.

While the Mount Pleasant Baptist Church remains closed and under continuous repairs, the church's congregation is temporarily worshipping at the nearby Northern Virginia Baptist Center on Glenkirk Road in Linton Hall.

=== Preservation ===
In a September 2020 Board of County Supervisors meeting, attempts to block a plan for future development near the church were rejected by Prince William County supervisors. Previously, attempts to block Dominion Energy from constructing power lines through the area were successful in 2017, but commentors at the 2020 public hearing speculated that the rejection was to reserve land for future residential and commercial development instead. In May 2025, the Prince William Board of County Supervisors would approve the rezoning of the land adjacent to the church that The Settlement was located on from its current agricultural use to allow homebuilder K. Hovnanian Homes to construct 210 single-family houses.

On December 10, 2020, the Virginia Department of Historic Resources added Mount Pleasant Baptist Church and Cemetery to the Virginia Landmarks Register. Months later on February 19, 2021, the National Park Service added the church and cemetery site to the National Register of Historic Places.

== Cemetery ==
The church's graveyard consists of around 230 graves, the earliest dating back to 1885. Among the buried is Sally Grayson, the first African American landowner in The Settlement.
