= Arktos Media =

Far-right publishing company (2009-)

- Founded: November 2009; 16 years ago
- Founders: Daniel Friberg (CEO); John B. Morgan
- Headquarters location: Budapest
- Official website: arktos.com

Arktos Media is a publishing company known for publishing authors of the European New Right, as well as translating European far-right literature into English. It has been described by historian Mark Sedgwick as a "radical-right publisher".

== History ==
Arktos was founded in India in 2009 by Swedish businessman and former active neo-Nazi Daniel Friberg and John B. Morgan, an American editor. The company launched in 2010, then relocated to Sweden in 2014 and Hungary in 2015. Friberg had previously distributed white power music and Nazi paraphernalia before starting the company. His stated goal was to create a Swedish parallel to American alt-right media.

Friberg is the CEO, while Gregory Lauder-Frost, formerly of the Conservative Monday Club, leads the British division. American professor Jason Jorjani became editor-in-chief in 2016, but later left that position when he began to distance himself from the alt-right, though he has since then continued to release books with the publisher.

Arktos was the world's largest distributor of far-right literature as of 2017, according to The New Yorker. In 2019, Arktos was publishing more than 120 titles by 54 authors, including translations of the Russian ultra-nationalist Alexander Dugin and the French far-right thinker Alain de Benoist.

== See also ==
- AltRight Corporation
