= Savitri Devi =

Greek Nazi spy and occultist (1905–1982)

Savitri Devi Mukherji
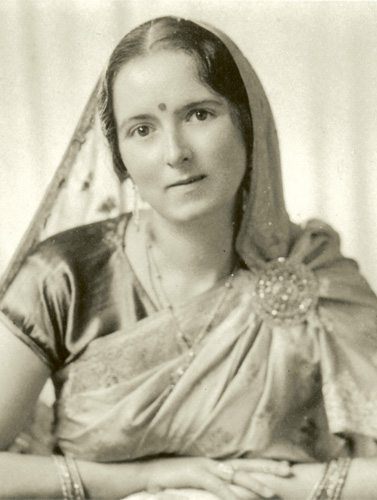
- Devi in 1937
- Born: Maximiani Julia Portas; 30 September 1905; Lyon, France
- Died: 22 October 1982 (aged 77); Sible Hedingham, Essex, England
- Citizenship: France (1905–1928; renounced); Greece (1928–1982; death)
- Education: University of Lyon (BA, BS, PhD)
- Occupations: Teacher, author, political activist, spy
- Notable work: The Lightning and the Sun; Impeachment of Man
- Movement: Esoteric neo-Nazism
- Spouse: Asit Krishna Mukherji
- Espionage activity
- Allegiance: Nazi Germany
- Service branch: Sicherheitsdienst (SD)
- Service years: 1941–1945

Savitri Devi Mukherji (Note: Bengali: সাবিত্রী দেবী মুখার্জী) (born Maximiani Julia Portas, French: [maksimjani pɔʁtɑs]; 30 September 1905 – 22 October 1982) was a French-born Greek Nazi activist, spy, and author. She served the Axis powers by committing acts of espionage against the Allied forces in India. An exponent of esoteric Hitlerism, she became a leading member of the neo-Nazi underground during the 1960s. Savitri was a proponent of a synthesis of Hinduism and Nazism, proclaiming Adolf Hitler to have been an avatar of the Hindu god Vishnu. She depicted Hitler as a sacrifice for humanity that would lead to the end of the worst age, the Kali Yuga, which she believed was induced by the Jews. She was also a radical animal rights activist and vegetarian.

Savitri was an associate in the post-war years of several neo-Nazi and Nazi figures. She was also one of the founding members of the World Union of National Socialists. Her writings have influenced neo-Nazism, especially esoteric neo-Nazism. Within neo-Nazism, she promoted occultism and ecology, and her works have influenced the alt-right.

== Early years ==
Born as Maximiani Julia Portas in 1905 in Lyon, Savitri Devi was the daughter of Maxim Portas, a French citizen of Greek and Italian descent, and an English woman, Julia Portas (née Nash). From childhood and throughout her life, she was a passionate advocate for animal rights. Her earliest political affiliations were with Greek nationalism. In her youth she was interested in German philosophy and Germany in general; she was disturbed by Germany's treatment at the end of World War I and by the treatment of Greek refugees simultaneously. She blamed the Jews for the defeat of Germany.

Educated in Greece and France, Portas studied philosophy and chemistry, earning two bachelor's degrees (one in philosophy and one in science) and a PhD from the University of Lyon based on her thesis La simplicité mathématique under Étienne Souriau. She next traveled to Greece, and surveyed the legendary ruins. Here, she became familiar with Heinrich Schliemann's discovery of swastikas in Anatolia. Her conclusion was that the Ancient Greeks were Aryan in origin. Her first two books were her 1935 doctoral dissertations: Essai critique sur Théophile Kaïris (a thesis about philosopher Theophilos Kairis) and La simplicité mathématique.

Influenced by her hatred of the Bible and later Zionist actions in Palestine, she became antisemitic at a young age. In early 1928, Portas renounced her French citizenship and acquired Greek nationality. In 1929 (a year of conflict between Arabs and Jews in the region) she joined a pilgrimage to the British Mandate of Palestine during Lent, which reinforced her beliefs. Portas was also influenced in her antisemitism by various French intellectuals, with whom antisemitism was prolific; she was especially influenced by Ernest Renan.

== Nazism and move to India ==
During the 1930s, Portas increasingly came to admire Nazism and Adolf Hitler. She read and greatly appreciated The Myth of the Twentieth Century, a lengthy book on Nazi ideology written by Alfred Rosenberg; academic Jeffrey Kaplan commented that Portas may have been one of the only people to have read the book, which even Hitler had found unreadable, in full. In 1932, she traveled to India in search of a living pagan Aryan culture, believing that the country represented an ideal racial caste system. Once in India, she studied classical Indian texts, perceiving them as evidence of the "greatness of the Aryan race".

Formally adhering to Hinduism, she took the name Savitri Devi (Hindi: सावित्री देवी), in honor of the Indian sun god Savitri. In 1937 she volunteered to work at the Hindu Mission, and wrote A Warning to the Hindus in order to offer her support for Hindu nationalism and independence, and rally resistance to the spread of Christianity and Islam in India. During the 1930s, she distributed pro-Axis propaganda and engaged in intelligence gathering on the British in India. She claimed that, during World War II, she enabled Subhas Chandra Bose (the leader of the Axis-affiliated Indian National Army) to contact representatives of the Empire of Japan.

On 9 June 1940 in Calcutta, Devi married Asit Krishna Mukherji, a Bengali pro-Nazi and an Indian nationalist, who edited the pro-German newspaper New Mercury. It was the only pro-Nazi paper in India, and Devi had read it prior to their meeting; the German ambassador to India commented that no one had helped them in India to the extent Mukherji had. During 1941, Devi chose to interpret Allied military support for Greece, against Italian and German forces, as an invasion of Greece. Devi and Mukherji lived in Calcutta and continued to gather intelligence for the Axis cause. This included entertaining Allied personnel, which gave Devi and Mukherji an opportunity to question them about military matters. The information which they gathered was passed on to Japanese intelligence officials and the Japanese military found it useful when they launched attacks against Allied airbases and army units. During this time she wrote three books, in addition to a play about the Egyptian pharaoh Akhenaten; this work is kept in print by the occult order AMORC.

== Post-war Nazi activism ==
After World War II, she travelled to England in 1945 under the name Savitri Devi Mukherji as the wife of a British subject from India, with a British Indian passport. She briefly stopped in England, then she visited her mother in France, with whom she would quarrel over the latter's support for the French Resistance. She then traveled to Iceland, where she witnessed the eruption of Mount Hekla on 5–6 April 1947. While in Iceland, she also adopted the Norse pantheon. She briefly returned to England, then she traveled to Sweden, where she met Sven Hedin.

On 15 June 1948, she boarded the Nord Express and traveled from Denmark to Germany, where she distributed thousands of copies of handwritten leaflets in which she encouraged the "Men and women of Germany" to "hold fast to our glorious National Socialist faith, and resist!" She recounted her experience in Gold in the Furnace (which was re-edited and released as Gold in the Furnace: Experiences in Post-War Germany to coincide with the hundredth anniversary of her birth).

Arrested for posting bills, she was tried in Düsseldorf on 5 April 1949 for the promotion of Nazi ideas on German territory as a subject of the Allied Control Council, and sentenced to three years imprisonment. She served time in Werl Prison, where she befriended her fellow Nazi and SS prisoners (recounted in Defiance), before she was released early in August 1949 and expelled from Germany. She then resided in Lyon, France.

In April 1953, she obtained a Greek passport in her maiden name in order to re-enter Germany, and while she was there, she went on a pilgrimage, as she called it, to Nazi "holy" sites. She flew from Athens to Rome and then she traveled by rail over the Brenner Pass into "Greater Germany", which she regarded as "the spiritual home of all racially conscious modern Aryans". She traveled to a number of sites which were significant in the life of Adolf Hitler and the history of the Nazi Party, as well as German nationalist and heathen monuments, as recounted in her 1958 book Pilgrimage.

Savitri Devi became a friend of Hans-Ulrich Rudel, and she completed her manuscript of The Lightning and the Sun at his home in March 1956. Through his introductions, she was able to meet a number of Nazi émigrés in Spain and the Middle East. In 1957, she visited Johann von Leers in Egypt and traveled across the Middle East before she returned to her home in New Delhi, making stops in Beirut, Damascus, Baghdad, Tehran, and Zahedan. In 1961 she stayed with Otto Skorzeny in Madrid.

Savitri Devi took employment teaching in France during the 1960s, spending her summer holidays with friends at Berchtesgaden. In the spring of 1961, while she was on her Easter holiday in London, she learned about the existence of the original British National Party (BNP). This group emerged after the Second World War when a handful of former members of the British Union of Fascists took on the name. She met BNP president Andrew Fountaine. Beginning a correspondence with Colin Jordan, she became a devoted supporter of the National Socialist Movement. Savitri was an associate in the post-war years of Françoise Dior, Otto Skorzeny, Johann von Leers, and Hans-Ulrich Rudel.

In August 1962 Savitri signed the Cotswold Agreement which established the World Union of National Socialists (WUNS), and attended Colin Jordan's Gloucestershire conference. At this conference she met, and was greatly impressed by, George Lincoln Rockwell. When Rockwell became the leader of the WUNS, he appointed William Luther Pierce the editor of its new magazine: National Socialist World (1966–1968). Along with articles by Jordan and Rockwell, Pierce devoted nearly eighty pages of the first issue of the magazine to a condensed edition of The Lightning and the Sun. Because of the enthusiastic response, Pierce included chapters from Gold in the Furnace and Defiance in subsequent issues.

After retiring from teaching in 1970, Savitri Devi spent nine months at the Normandy home of her close friend Françoise Dior while she was working on her memoirs; although she was welcome at first, her annoying personal habits began to disrupt life at the presbytery (among her habits, she did not take baths during her stay and she continually chewed garlic). Concluding that her pension would go much further in India and encouraged by Françoise Dior, she flew from Paris to Bombay on 23 June 1971. In August, she moved to New Delhi, where she lived alone, with a number of cats and at least one cobra.

Savitri Devi continued to correspond with Nazi enthusiasts in Europe and the Americas, particularly with Colin Jordan, Matt Koehl and other neo-Nazis. Ernst Zündel proposed a series of taped interviews and published a new edition of The Lightning and the Sun in 1979.

== Death ==
By the late 1970s, she had developed cataracts and her eyesight was rapidly deteriorating as a result. Myriam Hirn, a clerk from the French embassy in India, looked after her, making regular house visits. She decided to leave India, returning to Germany to live in Bavaria in 1981 before moving back to France in 1982.

Savitri died in 1982 in Sible Hedingham, Essex, England, at a friend's home. The cause of her death was recorded as a heart attack and coronary thrombosis. She was en route to lecture in the United States at the invitation of Matt Koehl at the time of her death. Her body was cremated in a simple ceremony in Colchester, Essex which was attended by Tony Williams as well as two young British Nazis. Devi's ashes were shipped in an inscribed urn to the headquarters of the American Nazi Party in Arlington, Virginia, where they were then taken and purportedly placed by Matt Koehl next to those of George Lincoln Rockwell in a "Nazi Hall of Honor" in Milwaukee, Wisconsin. At the time of her death she was reportedly very poor.

== Views ==
Devi developed an occultist view of Nazism, as espoused in The Lightning and the Sun. She disliked democracy and the current state of western civilisation. Savitri was a proponent of a synthesis of Hinduism and Nazism, proclaiming Adolf Hitler to have been an avatar of the Hindu god Vishnu. She was an early Holocaust denier.

Devi was also an animal rights activist, as well as a vegetarian from a young age, and she also espoused ecologist views in her works. She wrote Impeachment of Man in 1959 in India in which she espoused her views on animal rights and nature. According to her, human beings do not stand above the animals; in her ecologist views, humans are a part of the ecosystem and as a result, they should respect all life, including animals and the whole of nature.

She held radical views with regard to vegetarianism and believed that people who do not "respect nature or animals" should be executed. She also believed that vivisection, circuses, slaughter and fur industries among others do not belong in a civilised society.

== Legacy ==
In life, Devi had few accomplishments (at least relative to her goals of restarting Nazism), but her writing continues to greatly influence the neo-Nazi movement, particularly esoteric neo-Nazism. Academic Jeffrey Kaplan described Devi as "one of the most compelling figures to emerge from the wreckage of post-war National Socialism", and noted her influence on neo-Nazi occultism, "more than any single figure". Her works have also influenced the alt-right, as well as New Age religiosity and deep ecology. In addition to her writings her correspondence with many far-righters was significantly influential to the neo-Nazi movement.

She also influenced the Chilean diplomat Miguel Serrano, and her Holocaust denial influenced Ernst Zündel. In 1982, Franco Freda published a German translation of her work Gold in the Furnace, and the fourth volume of his annual review, Risguardo (1980–), was devoted to Savitri Devi as the "missionary of Aryan Paganism".

== Works ==
- Essai critique sur Théophile Kaïris (1935)
- La simplicité mathématique (1935)
- A Warning to the Hindus (1936)
- L'Etang aux lotus (1940)
- The Non-Hindu Indians and Indian Unity (1940)
- A Son of God: The Life and Philosophy of Akhnaton, King of Egypt (1946)
- Defiance (1950)
- Gold in the Furnace (1952)
- Pilgrimage (1958)
- The Lightning and the Sun (1958)
- Impeachment of Man (1958)
- Long-Whiskers and the Two-Legged Goddess, or The True Story of a "Most Objectionable Nazi" and... half-a-dozen Cats (1965)
- Souvenirs et reflexions d'une aryenne (1976)

== See also ==
- Cornelius Castoriadis (tutored by Devi)
- Ecofascism
- Nazi racial theories
