= Greg Johnson (white nationalist) =

American white nationalist (born 1971)

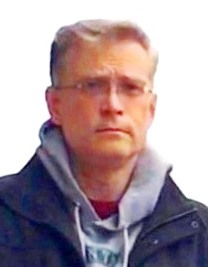
- Johnson in 2019
- Born: 1971 (age 54–55)
- Education: Oregon State University (B.A. in Philosophy); Catholic University of America (M.A. & Ph.D. in Philosophy)
- Occupation: Editor-in-chief of Counter-Currents Publishing
- Known for: White nationalism

Academic background
- Thesis: A Commentary on Kant's Dreams of a Spirit-Seer (2001)
- Doctoral advisor: Richard Velkley

Gregory Johnson (born 1971) is an American white nationalist and advocate for a white ethnostate. He is known for his role as editor-in-chief of the white nationalist imprint Counter-Currents Publishing, which he founded in 2010 with Michael Polignano.

Through Counter-Currents he has published over 40 books, several of which he wrote himself, either under his real name or the pseudonym Trevor Lynch. He has also written for the antisemitic far-right online publication Occidental Observer. A high-profile white nationalist, he has appeared at far-right events in Europe, and in 2019 was arrested in Norway before one such event and deported. He lives in Seattle, Washington.

== Early life and education ==
Johnson has kept his personal life private, and few photos of him have been published. He was born in 1971, the son of a Democratic union member, he has said in interviews. He has said he was libertarian in high school, read Ayn Rand in early college (becoming in his words "a bit of a boy Objectivist"), and afterward considered himself paleoconservative and finally white nationalist. He has said that after arguments in graduate school about Heidegger with Jewish students, "That’s when I knew this guy [Hitler] was telling the truth".

He taught philosophy part-time at Morehouse College from February 1994 to December 1997. While living in Atlanta, Georgia (in late 1999 or early 2000), Johnson met Joshua Buckley, a former skinhead and the editor of Tyr, a radical Traditionalist journal. In September 2000, Johnson attended a lecture given by British Holocaust denier David Irving. He considered founding his own white nationalist journal, but reconsidered when The Occidental Quarterly was founded in 2001.

Johnson received a Ph.D. in philosophy from the Catholic University of America in 2001.

In 2002, he joined the faculty of the Pacific School of Religion as a visiting assistant professor of Philosophy and Swedenborgian Studies.

=== Publishing and activism ===
In 2007, Johnson became the editor of The Occidental Quarterly, establishing its online version in collaboration with Michael J. Polignano.

In April 2010, Johnson left the editorship of The Occidental Quarterly and, with Polignano, co-founded Counter-Currents to publicize European New Right ideas, including Nouvelle Droite authors Alain de Benoist and Guillaume Faye.

In 2014, Johnson feuded online with the white supremacist Richard B. Spencer after backing out of a conference held by Spencer's National Policy Institute (NPI) in Budapest, Hungary, that nearly collapsed.

In June 2017, Hope not Hate's Patrik Hermansson went undercover to interview alt-right figures including Johnson at a meeting of the Puget Sound-area white nationalist Northwest Forum, which Johnson organized. Speaking to Hermansson, Johnson boasted about Counter-Currents' traffic, supported ethnostates, and said Jews should be expelled to Israel. David Lewis of the Stranger went undercover at another meeting of the group in August 2017, which 70 to 80 people attended, and described efforts by white nationalists to pretend to support diversity in the technology industry and "move into positions of power where they can hire other racists and keep non-whites from getting into the company."

Following the murder of an anti-fascist protester during the Charlottesville Unite the Right rally in August 2017, Counter-Currents was deplatformed from PayPal, which jeopardized its funding.

On November 2, 2019, Johnson was arrested in Norway before a far-right conference in Oslo, and deported two days later, because of his previous writing about the Norwegian extremist mass murderer Anders Breivik.

In September 2023, it was reported that Johnson had participated in a four-week course of Hungarian language at Eötvös Loránd University in Budapest, leading participants to speculate that he might intend to stay in the country long term. Following complaints, the university launched an investigation, but ultimately determined that the university's code of ethics did not apply to participants of the language course.

== Views ==
Johnson supports the creation of ethnicity-specific white ethnostates in which only white people would live. He has claimed that "Blacks don’t find white civilization comfortable". Johnson has claimed that white nationalism is not the same as white supremacy but "if forced to live under multicultural systems, we are going to take our own side and try to make sure that our values reign supreme."

He has endorsed the white genocide conspiracy theory. He alleged that "The organized Jewish community is the principal enemy – not the sole enemy, but the principal enemy – of every attempt to halt and reverse white extinction." He has also made statements against Christianity, saying it is responsible for white "racial suicide".

He opposes reproductive rights and access to birth control, writing, "you can't leave birth control up to the individual". He has said that white women should have children earlier in their lives. Johnson describes himself as "transphobic", writing that "transsexualism is a ghastly, insane phenomenon in America today, or in the white world today".

Johnson has argued for more tolerance of homosexuality in white nationalism, writing that "I have met a number of homosexuals in the contemporary White Nationalist movement, and I have my suspicions about a few others. All of these people, however, are intelligent and accomplished. They are real assets to the movement."

== Influences ==
Johnson has said he was influenced by the esoteric proponent of Nazism Savitri Devi starting in 2000. Under the pen name R. G. Fowler, he created "The Savitri Devi Archive", and Counter-Currents has republished a centennial edition of her devotional poems to Adolf Hitler along with a new edition of The Lightning and the Sun (1958), which deifies Hitler as an avatar of the Hindu God Vishnu. American white nationalist William Luther Pierce was also an influence, in particular his antisemitic pamphlet Who Rules America? (but not The Turner Diaries). Johnson has also said he admired Jonathan Bowden, the former cultural officer of the British National Party and a contributor to Counter-Currents who died in 2012.
