= Razib Khan =

Bangladeshi-American writer

Razib Khan রাজীব খান
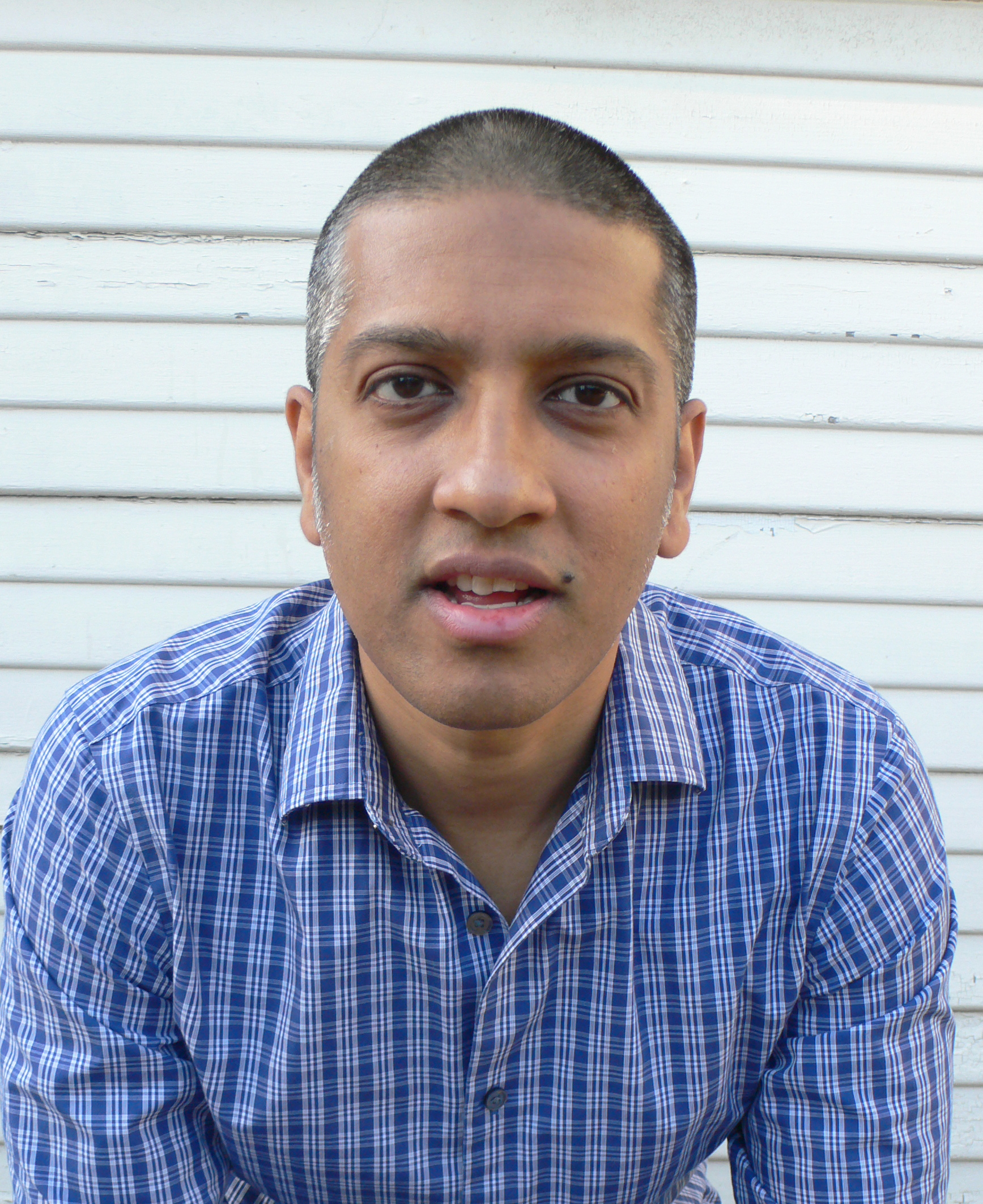
- Khan in 2015
- Born: Razyb Khan c. 1977 (age 48–49); Dhaka, Bangladesh
- Education: University of Oregon (BS); University of California, Davis
- Scientific career
- Fields: Population genetics

Razib Khan (Bengali: রাজীব খান) is a Bangladeshi-American writer and blogger whose work focuses on population genetics and consumer genomics. A self-described conservative and atheist, Khan has contributed to a variety of mainstream, conservative, and alt-right publications. In 2015, he was briefly hired as a science columnist for The New York Times, but his contract was subsequently canceled after his past writings on race and intelligence drew public scrutiny. Khan also garnered media attention in 2014 when he became one of the first people to sequence a child's genome in utero.

== Life and education ==
Khan was born in c. 1977 in Dhaka, Bangladesh. He grew up in Upstate New York and Eastern Oregon. He is an atheist despite his parents being Muslim.

At the University of Oregon, he completed his Bachelor of Science in biochemistry in 2000, and completed his Bachelor of Science in biology in 2006. He began but did not complete a graduate program at the University of California, Davis. During the early 2000s Khan received funding from right-wing millionaire Ron Unz and switched his focus to science.

== Blogging and writing ==
Khan blogged at GNXP (short for Gene Expression), which was hosted by Discover magazine for a period in the 2010s. As of 2026, his current blog, Unsupervised Learning, is hosted on Substack. He has written for The Guardian, National Review, Slate, Taki's Magazine, The Unz Review and other publications.

In March 2015, The New York Times announced that it had hired Khan on a short-term contract, and that he would write for them about once a month. The Times wrote he was "a science blogger and a doctoral candidate in genomics and genetics at the University of California, Davis. He writes about evolution, genetics, religion, politics and philosophy." In response, journalists documented Khan's contributions to the alt-right Taki's Magazine and VDARE, which included support for the belief that some races are biologically more intelligent than others. Following this, The New York Times removed him as a regular periodic contributor. The Times did not specifically mention the part of Khan's work they found uncomfortable, and he wrote two op-eds for the paper before they ended his contract.

In 2020 Khan summarized his political evolution: "I have gone from being a moderate libertarian in the early 2000s to more of a populist conservative in 2020, albeit of a moderate and cosmopolitan personal bent." In 2021, Khan expressed a sympathetic view of Hindutva, writing in UnHerd that the rise of Hindu nationalism and its domination of Indian politics would lead to a "native cultural ascendancy", describing Hindutva as a "deep-rooted indigenous [identity]" similar to Chinese or Japanese nationalism. He spoke at pronatalist conference Natalcon in Austin in 2024.

== Genome sequencing ==
In 2014, Khan made news when he sequenced his son's genome in utero. Senior editor for biomedicine for MIT Technology Review, Antonio Regalado wrote his son may be the first healthy person to have his entire genome sequenced before being born. In an interview with Don Gonyea for NPR's Weekend Edition, Khan stated his child was the most important thing in his life, so it made sense to know everything about his genetics. He was able to obtain the genome sequence by requesting a chorionic villus sampling (CVS) test. After obtaining the raw genetic data, Khan used the free software Promethease to analyze the data. Khan believes society is in the "second age of eugenics," and full genome sequences of fetuses will become standard procedure for parents in the 21st century. Australian bioethicist Ainsley Newson wrote "Khan's decision to obtain the whole genome sequence of his partner's fetus while in utero shows us that genomics is no longer a fantasy."
