= Bibliography of the Mexican American War =

Mexican–American War
- Part of the Manifest destiny
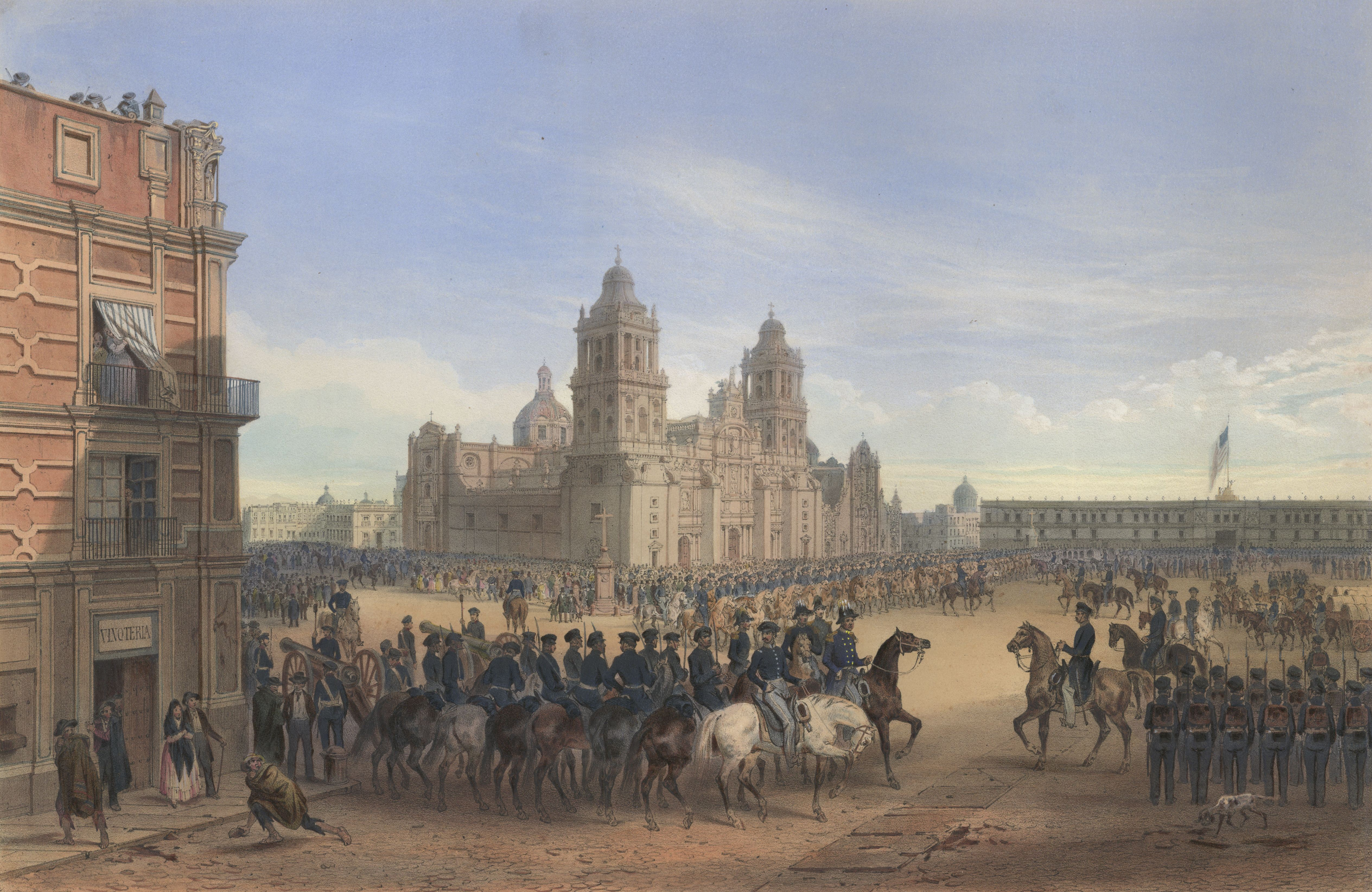
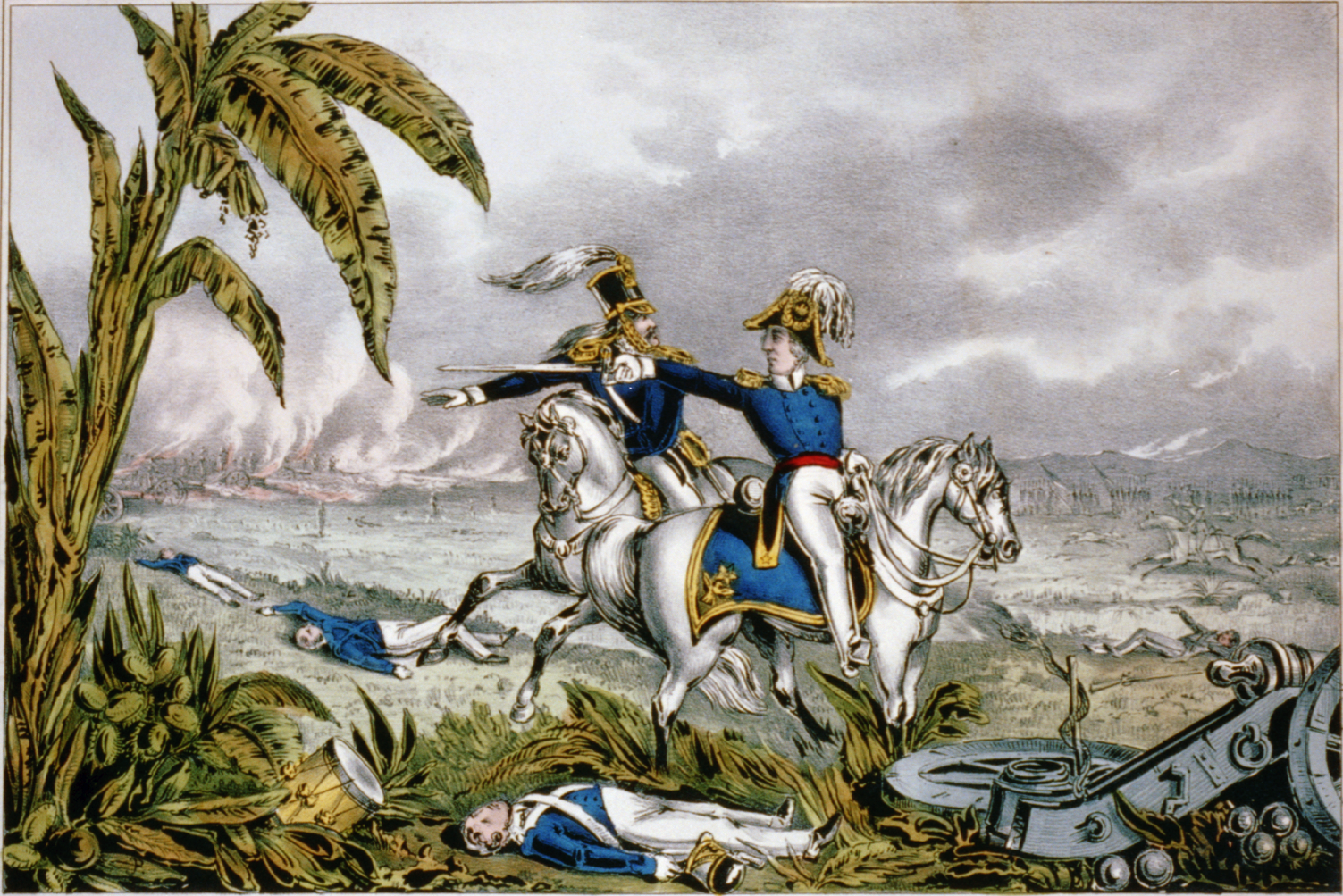
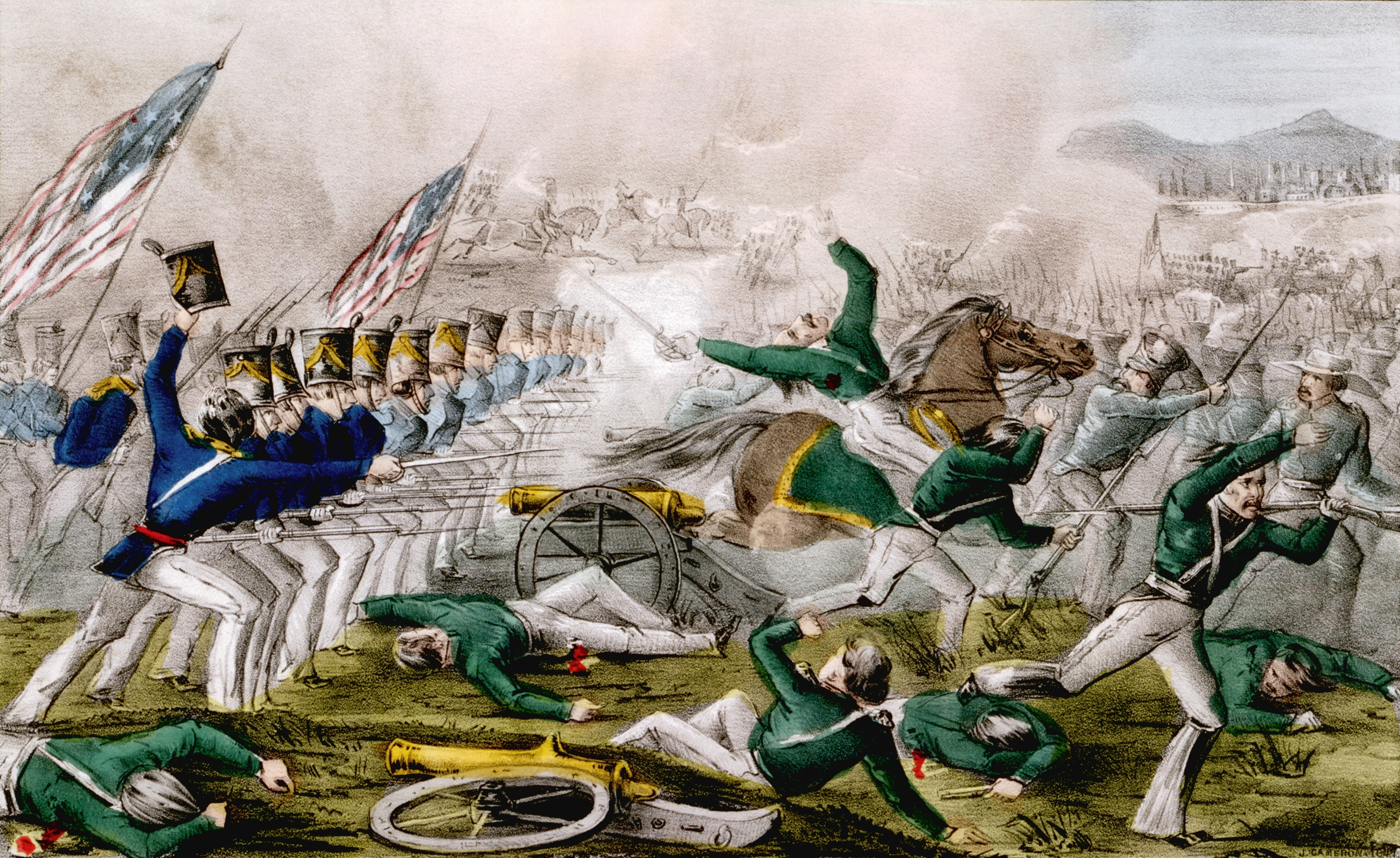
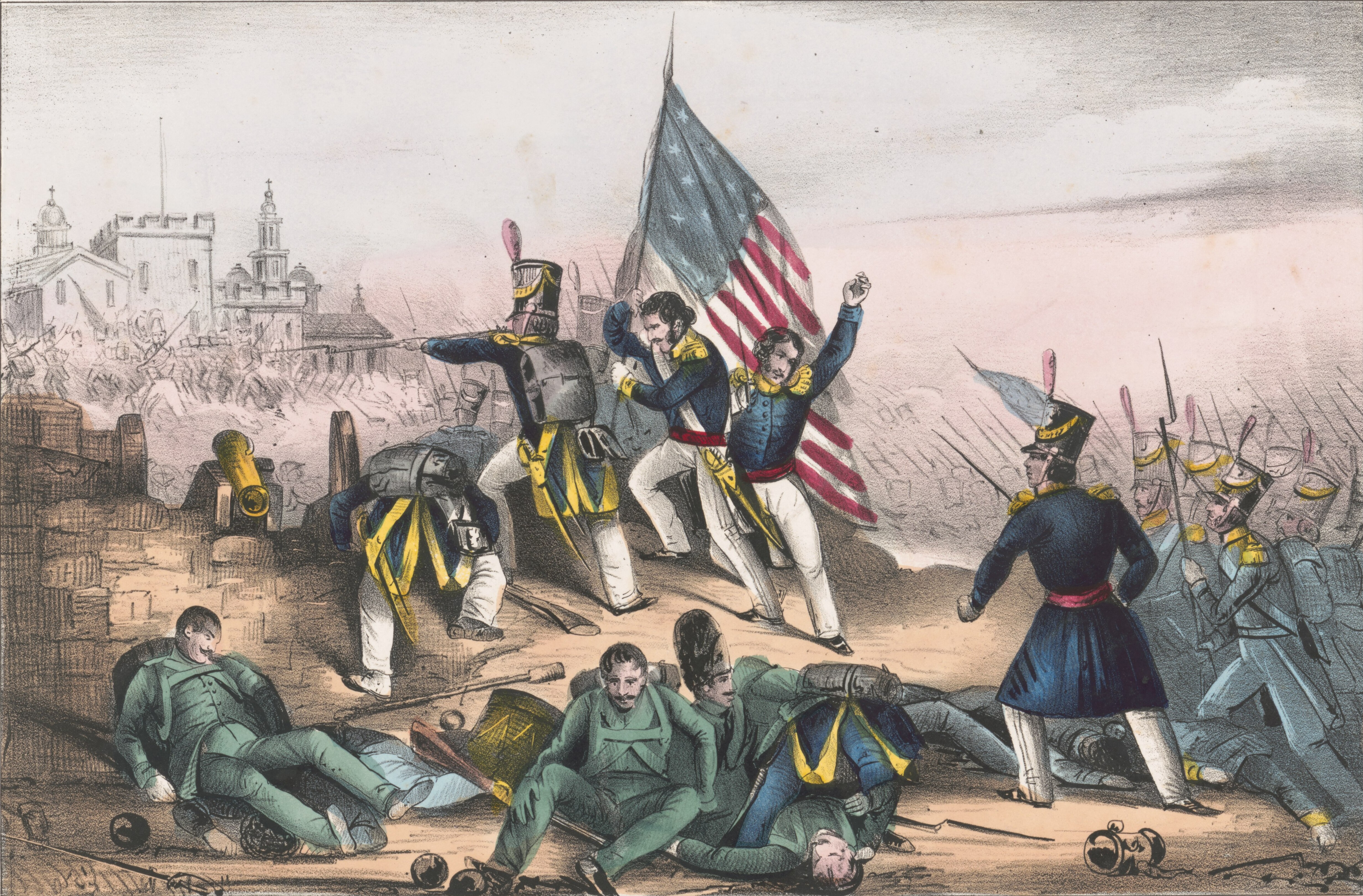
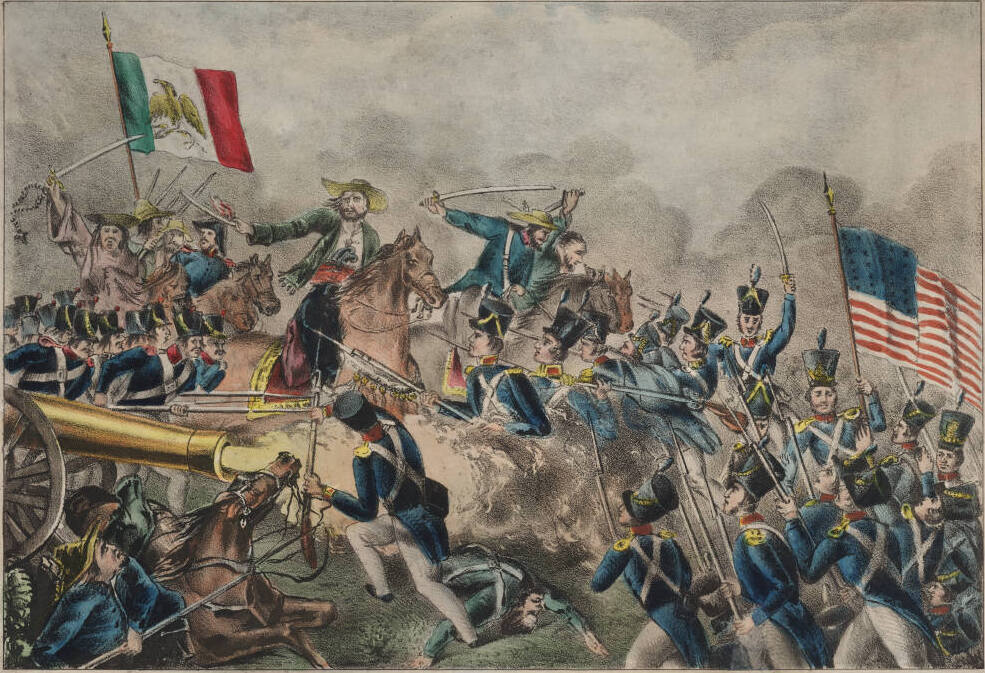
- Clockwise from top: Winfield Scott entering Plaza de la Constitución after the Fall of Mexico City, U.S. soldiers engaging the retreating Mexican force during the Battle of Resaca de la Palma, U.S. victory at Churubusco outside of Mexico City, Marines storming Chapultepec castle under a large U.S. flag, Battle of Cerro Gordo
Date	April 25, 1846 – February 2, 1848 (1 year, 9 months, 1 week and 1 day)
Location	Texas, New Mexico, California; Northern, Central, and Eastern Mexico; Mexico City
Result	American victory
Territorial changes	Mexican Cession: Mexico cedes to the U.S. present-day California, Texas, New Mexico, Utah, Nevada, and Arizona, and parts of Colorado, Oklahoma, Kansas, and Wyoming, for $15 million

This is a select bibliography of academic level books and journal articles, published mainly after World War II, (Note: Works published during or before World War II should be limited to areas where there are no significant post-World War II books on the subject or when the work in question has significant historical merit.) about the history of the Mexican–American War and its historical context.

The Mexican–American War (April 25, 1846 – February 2, 1848), known in Mexico as the United States intervention in Mexico, was an invasion of Mexico by the United States. It followed the 1845 American annexation of Texas, which Mexico still claimed as its territory, and a dispute over the border: Texas and the U.S. asserted the Rio Grande, Mexico the more northerly Nueces River. President James K. Polk, elected in 1844 on a platform of territorial expansion, offered $25 million for the disputed land and California; Mexico refused. He then sent troops into the disputed territory, where Mexican forces repelled them on April 25, 1846, giving Polk grounds to obtain a declaration of war from Congress.

U.S. forces occupied Santa Fe de Nuevo México and Alta California, the Pacific Squadron blockaded Mexico's Pacific coast, and Major General Winfield Scott landed at Veracruz and captured Mexico City in September 1847. The 1848 Treaty of Guadalupe Hidalgo, negotiated by Nicholas Trist after Polk had recalled him, ended the war: Mexico ceded the territory of present-day California, Nevada, and Utah and parts of Arizona, Colorado, New Mexico, and Wyoming, gave up its claims on Texas, and accepted the Rio Grande as its northern border with the United States, while the U.S. paid $15 million and assumed $3.25 million of Mexican debt to U.S. citizens. The acquisitions intensified the American debate over slavery and are seen by some scholars as a step toward the American Civil War, in which many officers who had gained experience in Mexico later held prominent commands. Mexico was left with heavy casualties, ruined finances, political turmoil, lost prestige, and the loss of more than half its territory.

Works listed here are cited in the notes or bibliographies of scholarly sources. Each is published by an academic or major press, written by a recognized expert, or substantially reviewed in scholarly journals; borderline cases are omitted. A selection of primary sources are included. Many of the books below carry their own bibliographies; see the Further reading section for other bibliographies, and the External links section for historical sites, academic sites, and museums.

Citations follow APA style. (Note: Entries are in plain text APA 7 format without templates; templates are used only for reviews and notes.) Book have citations to academic journal or mainstream published reviews when available. For books only partly about the subject, relevant chapter or section titles are provided when useful and available. Translators of the original-language edition are included when possible. In cases where a title or name has appeared with more than one English spelling, the most recent published form is used and a footnote documents any earlier title under which the work appeared.

== Surveys ==
- Bauer, K. J. (1974). The Mexican War, 1846–1848. Macmillan.
- Bill, A. H. (1947). Rehearsal for conflict: The war with Mexico, 1846–1848. Alfred A. Knopf.
- DeVoto, B. (1943). The year of decision: 1846. Little, Brown.
- Eisenhower, J. S. D. (1989). So far from God: The U.S. war with Mexico, 1846–1848. Random House.
- Greenberg, A. S. (2012). A wicked war: Polk, Clay, Lincoln, and the 1846 U.S. invasion of Mexico. Knopf.
- Guardino, P. (2017). The dead march: A history of the Mexican-American War. Harvard University Press.
- Henderson, T. J. (2007). A glorious defeat: Mexico and its war with the United States. Hill and Wang.
- Merry, R. W. (2009). A country of vast designs: James K. Polk, the Mexican War, and the conquest of the American continent. Simon & Schuster.
- Singletary, O. A. (1960). The Mexican War. University of Chicago Press.
- Smith, J. H. (1919). The war with Mexico (Vols. 1–2). Macmillan. Vol. 1; Vol. 2.
- Stephenson, N. W. (1921). Texas and the Mexican War: A chronicle of the winning of the Southwest. Yale University Press.
- Wheelan, J. (2007). Invading Mexico: America's continental dream and the Mexican War, 1846–1848. Carroll & Graf.

== Background and context ==
- Barker, E. C. (1917). California as the cause of the Mexican War. Texas Review, 2(3), 213–221. JSTOR 43465218
- Brack, G. M. (1975). Mexico views Manifest Destiny, 1821–1846: An essay on the origins of the Mexican War. University of New Mexico Press.
- DeLay, B. (2008). War of a thousand deserts: Indian raids and the U.S.-Mexican War. Yale University Press.
- Frymer, P. (2017). Building an American empire: The era of territorial and political expansion. Princeton University Press.
- Graebner, N. A. (1955). Empire on the Pacific: A study in American continental expansion. Ronald Press.
- Graebner, N. A. (1980). The Mexican War: A study in causation. Pacific Historical Review, 49(3), 405–426. JSTOR 3638563
- Greenberg, A. S. (2005). Manifest manhood and the antebellum American empire. Cambridge University Press.
- Haynes, S. W., & Morris, C. (Eds.). (1997). Manifest Destiny and empire: American antebellum expansionism. Texas A&M University Press.
- Hietala, T. R. (1985). Manifest design: Anxious aggrandizement in late Jacksonian America. Cornell University Press.
- Horsman, R. (1981). Race and Manifest Destiny: The origins of American racial Anglo-Saxonism. Harvard University Press.
- Howe, D. W. (2007). What hath God wrought: The transformation of America, 1815–1848. Oxford University Press.
- Jonas, P. M. (1992). William Parrott, American claims, and the Mexican War. Journal of the Early Republic, 12(2), 213–240. JSTOR 3124152
- Maltz, E. M. (2006). The Constitution and the annexation of Texas. Constitutional Commentary, 23(3), 381. doi:10.24926/26390742.1506
- McAfee, W. (1980). A reconsideration of the origins of the Mexican-American War. Southern California Quarterly, 62(1), 49–65. JSTOR 41170855
- Merk, F. (1963). Manifest Destiny and mission in American history: A reinterpretation. Alfred A. Knopf.
- Pletcher, D. M. (1973). The diplomacy of annexation: Texas, Oregon, and the Mexican War. University of Missouri Press.
- Price, G. W. (1967). Origins of the war with Mexico: The Polk-Stockton intrigue. University of Texas Press.
- Reséndez, A. (2005). Changing national identities at the frontier: Texas and New Mexico, 1800–1850. Cambridge University Press.
- Rugemer, E. B. (2007). Robert Monroe Harrison, British abolition, Southern Anglophobia and Texas annexation. Slavery & Abolition, 28(2), 169–191. doi:10.1080/01440390701428006
- Silbey, J. H. (2005). Storm over Texas: The annexation controversy and the road to Civil War. Oxford University Press.
- Smith, G. A. (1987). The war that wasn't: Thomas ap Catesby Jones's seizure of Monterey. California History, 66(2), 104–113. JSTOR 25591534
- Stenberg, R. R. (1935). The failure of Polk's Mexican War intrigue of 1845. Pacific Historical Review, 4(1), 39–68. JSTOR 3633243
- Stenberg, R. R. (1938). Polk and Frémont, 1845–1846. Pacific Historical Review, 7(3), 211–227. JSTOR 3634003
- Stenburg, R. R. (1941). President Polk and California: Additional documents. Pacific Historical Review, 10(2), 217–219. JSTOR 3633638
- Stephanson, A. (1995). Manifest Destiny: American expansionism and the empire of right. Hill and Wang.
- Torget, A. J. (2015). Seeds of empire: Cotton, slavery, and the transformation of the Texas borderlands, 1800–1850. University of North Carolina Press.
- Weber, D. J. (1982). The Mexican frontier, 1821–1846: The American Southwest under Mexico. University of New Mexico Press.
- Weeks, W. E. (1996). Building the continental empire: American expansion from the Revolution to the Civil War. Ivan R. Dee.

== Politics ==
- Borit, G. S. (1974). Lincoln's opposition to the Mexican War. Journal of the Illinois State Historical Society, 67(1), 79–100. JSTOR 40191441
- Brent, R. A. (1954). Nicholas P. Trist and the Treaty of Guadalupe Hidalgo. Southwestern Historical Quarterly, 57(4), 454–474. JSTOR 30240740
- Chamberlin, E. K. (1963). Nicholas Trist and Baja California. Pacific Historical Review, 32(1), 49–63. JSTOR 4492128
- Drexler, R. W. (1991). Guilty of making peace: A biography of Nicholas P. Trist. University Press of America.
- Foner, E. (1969). The Wilmot Proviso revisited. The Journal of American History, 56(2), 262. JSTOR 1908123
- Gatell, F. O. (1958). "Conscience and judgment": The bolt of the Massachusetts Conscience Whigs. The Historian, 21(1), 18–45. doi:10.1111/j.1540-6563.1958.tb01609.x
- Gatell, F. O. (1958). Palfrey's vote, the Conscience Whigs, and the election of Speaker Winthrop. The New England Quarterly, 31(2), 218. JSTOR 362426
- Gilley, B. H. (1979). "Polk's War" and the Louisiana press. Louisiana History: The Journal of the Louisiana Historical Association, 20(1), 5–23. JSTOR 4231864
- Gilley, B. H. (1981). Tennessee Whigs and the Mexican War. Tennessee Historical Quarterly, 40(1), 46–67. JSTOR 42626155
- Graebner, N. A. (1953). Party politics and the Trist mission. Journal of Southern History, 19(2), 137–156. JSTOR 2955010
- Hicks, R. S. (1922). Diplomatic relations with Mexico during the administration of James K. Polk. Annual Publication of the Historical Society of Southern California, 12(2), 5–17. JSTOR 41168793
- Lander, E. M., Jr. (1980). Reluctant imperialists: Calhoun, the South Carolinians, and the Mexican War. Louisiana State University Press.
- Maltz, E. M. (2006). The Constitution and the annexation of Texas. Constitutional Commentary, 23(3), 381. doi:10.24926/26390742.1506
- Merk, F. (1969). Dissent in the Mexican War. Proceedings of the Massachusetts Historical Society, 81, 120–136. JSTOR 25080671
- Miles, E. A. (1957). "Fifty-four forty or fight"—An American political legend. The Mississippi Valley Historical Review, 44(2), 291. JSTOR 1887191
- Morrison, M. A. (1997). Slavery and the American West: The eclipse of Manifest Destiny and the coming of the Civil War. University of North Carolina Press.
- Neely, M. E., Jr. (1981). War and partisanship: What Lincoln learned from James K. Polk. Journal of the Illinois State Historical Society, 74(3), 199–216. JSTOR 40191576
- Nelson, A. K. (1972). The secret diplomacy of James K. Polk during the Mexican War, 1846–1847 [Doctoral dissertation, George Washington University]. ProQuest Dissertations Publishing.
- Nelson, A. K. (1988). Secret agents: President Polk and the search for peace with Mexico. Garland Publishing.
- Nortrup, J. (1968). Nicholas Trist's mission to Mexico: A reinterpretation. Southwestern Historical Quarterly, 71(3), 321–346. JSTOR 30236439
- Ohrt, W. (1997). Defiant peacemaker: Nicholas Trist in the Mexican War. Texas A&M University Press.
- Pinheiro, J. C. (2003). "Religion without restriction": Anti-Catholicism, All Mexico, and the Treaty of Guadalupe Hidalgo. Journal of the Early Republic, 23(1), 69. JSTOR 3124986
- Pinheiro, J. C. (2007). Manifest ambition: James K. Polk and civil-military relations during the Mexican War. Praeger Security International.
- Pletcher, D. M. (1973). The diplomacy of annexation: Texas, Oregon, and the Mexican War. University of Missouri Press.
- Rugemer, E. B. (2007). Robert Monroe Harrison, British abolition, Southern Anglophobia and Texas annexation. Slavery & Abolition, 28(2), 169–191. doi:10.1080/01440390701428006
- Schroeder, J. H. (1973). Mr. Polk's war: American opposition and dissent, 1846–1848. University of Wisconsin Press.
- Sellers, C. G. (1966). James K. Polk, continentalist, 1843–1846. Princeton University Press.
- Silbey, J. H. (2005). Storm over Texas: The annexation controversy and the road to Civil War. Oxford University Press.
- Sperber, H. (1957). "Fifty-four forty or fight": Facts and fictions. American Speech, 32(1), 5. JSTOR 454081
- Stegmaier, M. J. (1996). Texas, New Mexico, and the Compromise of 1850: Boundary dispute and sectional crisis. Kent State University Press.

== Military campaigns and commanders ==
- Bauer, K. J. (1985). Zachary Taylor: Soldier, planter, statesman of the Old Southwest. Louisiana State University Press.
- DePalo, W. A., Jr. (1997). The Mexican national army, 1822–1852. Texas A&M University Press.
- Foos, P. (2002). A short, offhand, killing affair: Soldiers and social conflict during the Mexican-American War. University of North Carolina Press.
- Guardino, P. (2022). The constant recurrence of such atrocities: Guerrilla warfare and counterinsurgency during the Mexican-American War. The Journal of the Civil War Era, 12(1), 3–27. doi:10.1353/cwe.2022.0001
- Haecker, C. M., & Mauck, J. G. (1997). On the prairie of Palo Alto: Historical archaeology of the U.S.-Mexican War battlefield. Texas A&M University Press.
- Harlow, N. (1982). California conquered: War and peace on the Pacific, 1846–1850. University of California Press.
- Johnson, T. D. (1998). Winfield Scott: The quest for military glory. University Press of Kansas.
- Johnson, T. D. (2007). A gallant little army: The Mexico City campaign. University Press of Kansas.
- Lavender, D. (1966). Climax at Buena Vista: The American campaigns in northeastern Mexico, 1846–47. J. B. Lippincott.
- Levinson, I. W. (2005). Wars within war: Mexican guerrillas, domestic elites, and the United States of America, 1846–1848. Texas Christian University Press.
- McCaffrey, J. M. (1992). Army of Manifest Destiny: The American soldier in the Mexican War, 1846–1848. New York University Press.
- McCornack, R. B. (1951). The San Patricio deserters in the Mexican War. The Americas, 8(2), 131–142. JSTOR 978297
- Miller, R. R. (1989). Shamrock and sword: The Saint Patrick's Battalion in the U.S.-Mexican War. University of Oklahoma Press.
- Moten, M. (2014). Polk against his generals. In Presidents and their generals: An American history of command in war (pp. 97–123). Harvard University Press. doi:10.4159/harvard.9780674736016.c5
- Murphy, D. A. (2014). Two armies on the Rio Grande: The first campaign of the US-Mexican War. Texas A&M University Press.
- Peskin, A. (2003). Winfield Scott and the profession of arms. Kent State University Press.
- Pinheiro, J. C. (2007). Manifest ambition: James K. Polk and civil-military relations during the Mexican War. Praeger Security International.
- Wallace, E. S. (1950). The Battalion of Saint Patrick in the Mexican War. Military Affairs, 14(2), 84. JSTOR 1982456
- Winders, R. B. (1997). Mr. Polk's army: The American military experience in the Mexican War. Texas A&M University Press.

== Mexico ==
- Brack, G. M. (1975). Mexico views Manifest Destiny, 1821–1846: An essay on the origins of the Mexican War. University of New Mexico Press.
- Costeloe, M. P. (1993). The central republic in Mexico, 1835–1846: Hombres de bien in the age of Santa Anna. Cambridge University Press.
- DeLay, B. (2008). War of a thousand deserts: Indian raids and the U.S.-Mexican War. Yale University Press.
- DePalo, W. A., Jr. (1997). The Mexican national army, 1822–1852. Texas A&M University Press.
- Farías, J. C., & Miklian, J. (2023). Business, politics, and patriotism: Relationships between Antonio López de Santa Anna and foreign nationals in Mexico, 1829–1847. The International History Review, 46(5), 571–587. doi:10.1080/07075332.2023.2289906
- Fowler, W. (2007). Santa Anna of Mexico. University of Nebraska Press.
- Guardino, P. (2017). The dead march: A history of the Mexican-American War. Harvard University Press.
- Henderson, T. J. (2007). A glorious defeat: Mexico and its war with the United States. Hill and Wang.
- Levinson, I. W. (2005). Wars within war: Mexican guerrillas, domestic elites, and the United States of America, 1846–1848. Texas Christian University Press.
- Robinson, C. (Ed.). (1989). The view from Chapultepec: Mexican writers on the Mexican-American War. University of Arizona Press.
- Santoni, P. (1996). Mexicans at arms: Puro federalists and the politics of war, 1845–1848. Texas Christian University Press.
- Stevens, D. F. (1991). Origins of instability in early republican Mexico. Duke University Press.
- Terrazas, M. (2001). The regional conflict, the contractors, and the construction projects of a road to the Pacific at the end of the war between Mexico and the United States. The Journal of Popular Culture, 35(2), 161–169. doi:10.1111/j.0022-3840.2001.00161.x
- Weber, D. J. (1982). The Mexican frontier, 1821–1846: The American Southwest under Mexico. University of New Mexico Press.

== Aftermath ==
- Castro, R. F. (2013). Liberty like thunder: Race, Article XI enforcement, and the odyssey of Guadalupe Hidalgo (1848). American Journal of Legal History, 53(3), 303–327. doi:10.1093/ajlh/53.3.303
- De León, A. (1983). They called them greasers: Anglo attitudes toward Mexicans in Texas, 1821–1900. University of Texas Press.
- Gómez, L. E. (2007). Manifest destinies: The making of the Mexican American race. New York University Press.
- González-Quiroga, M. Á. (2020). War and peace on the Rio Grande frontier, 1830–1880. University of Oklahoma Press.
- Griswold del Castillo, R. (1986). Mexican views of 1848: The Treaty of Guadalupe Hidalgo through Mexican history. Journal of Borderlands Studies, 1(2), 24–40. doi:10.1080/08865655.1986.9695326
- Griswold del Castillo, R. (1990). The Treaty of Guadalupe Hidalgo: A legacy of conflict. University of Oklahoma Press.
- Hernández, S. (2001). The legacy of the Treaty of Guadalupe Hidalgo on Tejanos' land. The Journal of Popular Culture, 35(2), 101–109. doi:10.1111/j.0022-3840.2001.00101.x
- Menchaca, M. (2001). Recovering history, constructing race: The Indian, Black, and White roots of Mexican Americans. University of Texas Press.
- Montejano, D. (1987). Anglos and Mexicans in the making of Texas, 1836–1986. University of Texas Press.
- Montoya, M. E. (2002). Translating property: The Maxwell Land Grant and the conflict over land in the American West, 1840–1900. University of California Press.
- Morrison, M. A. (1997). Slavery and the American West: The eclipse of Manifest Destiny and the coming of the Civil War. University of North Carolina Press.
- Peterson, R. H. (1980). Anti-Mexican nativism in California, 1848–1853: A study of cultural conflict. Southern California Quarterly, 62(4), 309–327. JSTOR 41170898
- Pitt, L. (1966). Decline of the Californios: A social history of the Spanish-speaking Californians, 1846–1890. University of California Press.
- St. John, R. (2011). Line in the sand: A history of the western U.S.-Mexico border. Princeton University Press.
- Stegmaier, M. J. (1996). Texas, New Mexico, and the Compromise of 1850: Boundary dispute and sectional crisis. Kent State University Press.
- Terrazas, M. (2001). The regional conflict, the contractors, and the construction projects of a road to the Pacific at the end of the war between Mexico and the United States. The Journal of Popular Culture, 35(2), 161–169. doi:10.1111/j.0022-3840.2001.00161.x
- Valerio-Jiménez, O. S. (2013). River of hope: Forging identity and nation in the Rio Grande borderlands. Duke University Press.

== Miscellaneous ==
- Cirillo, V. J. (2009). "More fatal than powder and shot": Dysentery in the U.S. Army during the Mexican War, 1846–48. Perspectives in Biology and Medicine, 52(3), 400–413. doi:10.1353/pbm.0.0097
- Ellsworth, C. S. (1940). The American churches and the Mexican War. American Historical Review, 45(2), 301–326. JSTOR 1906279
- Foos, P. (2002). A short, offhand, killing affair: Soldiers and social conflict during the Mexican-American War. University of North Carolina Press.
- Greenberg, A. S. (2005). Manifest manhood and the antebellum American empire. Cambridge University Press.
- Guardino, P. (2014). Gender, soldiering, and citizenship in the Mexican-American War of 1846–1848. The American Historical Review, 119(1), 23–46. doi:10.1093/ahr/119.1.23
- Hinckley, T. C. (1962). American anti-Catholicism during the Mexican War. Pacific Historical Review, 31(2), 121–137. JSTOR 3636570
- Kurtz, W. B. (2014). "Let us hear no more 'nativism'": The Catholic press in the Mexican and Civil Wars. Civil War History, 60(1), 6–31. doi:10.1353/cwh.2014.0020
- Lacroix, P. (2020). Canadian-born soldiers in the Mexican-American War (1846–48): An opportunity for migration studies. International Journal of Canadian Studies, 57, 27–46. doi:10.3138/ijcs.57.x.27
- McCaffrey, J. M. (1992). Army of Manifest Destiny: The American soldier in the Mexican War, 1846–1848. New York University Press.
- Pinheiro, J. C. (2001). "Extending the light and blessings of our purer faith": Anti-Catholic sentiment among American soldiers in the U.S.-Mexican War. The Journal of Popular Culture, 35(2), 129–152. doi:10.1111/j.0022-3840.2001.00129.x
- Pinheiro, J. C. (2003). "Religion without restriction": Anti-Catholicism, All Mexico, and the Treaty of Guadalupe Hidalgo. Journal of the Early Republic, 23(1), 69. JSTOR 3124986
- Pinheiro, J. C. (2014). Missionaries of republicanism: A religious history of the Mexican-American War. Oxford University Press.
- Streeby, S. (2002). American sensations: Class, empire, and the production of popular culture. University of California Press.

== Biographies ==
=== James K. Polk ===
- Bergeron, P. H. (1987). The presidency of James K. Polk. University Press of Kansas.
- Borneman, W. R. (2008). Polk: The man who transformed the presidency and America. Random House.
- Dusinberre, W. (2003). Slavemaster president: The double career of James Polk. Oxford University Press.
- Haynes, S. W. (1997). James K. Polk and the expansionist impulse. Longman.
- Sellers, C. G. (1957). James K. Polk, Jacksonian, 1795–1843. Princeton University Press.
- Sellers, C. G. (1966). James K. Polk, continentalist, 1843–1846. Princeton University Press.

=== Winfield Scott ===
- Eisenhower, J. S. D. (1997). Agent of destiny: The life and times of General Winfield Scott. Free Press.
- Johnson, T. D. (1998). Winfield Scott: The quest for military glory. University Press of Kansas.
- Peskin, A. (2003). Winfield Scott and the profession of arms. Kent State University Press.

=== Zachary Taylor ===
- Bauer, K. J. (1985). Zachary Taylor: Soldier, planter, statesman of the Old Southwest. Louisiana State University Press.
- Eisenhower, J. S. D. (2008). Zachary Taylor. Times Books.
- Hamilton, H. (1951). Zachary Taylor: Soldier in the White House. Bobbs-Merrill.

=== Antonio López de Santa Anna and the Mexican command ===
- Callcott, W. H. (1936). Santa Anna: The story of an enigma who once was Mexico. University of Oklahoma Press.
- Fowler, W. (2000). Tornel and Santa Anna: The writer and the caudillo, Mexico, 1795–1853. Greenwood Press.
- Fowler, W. (2007). Santa Anna of Mexico. University of Nebraska Press.
- Jones, O. L., Jr. (1968). Santa Anna. Twayne.
- Scheina, R. L. (2002). Santa Anna: A curse upon Mexico. Brassey's.

=== United States military figures ===
- Brockmann, R. J. (2009). Commodore Robert F. Stockton, 1795–1866: Protean man for a protean nation. Cambria Press.
- Chaffin, T. (2002). Pathfinder: John Charles Frémont and the course of American empire. Hill and Wang.
- Chernow, R. (2017). Grant. Penguin Press.
- Clarke, D. L. (1961). Stephen Watts Kearny: Soldier of the West. University of Oklahoma Press.
- Cleaves, F. (1960). Meade of Gettysburg. University of Oklahoma Press.
- Cooper, W. J., Jr. (2000). Jefferson Davis, American. Knopf.
- Guelzo, A. C. (2021). Robert E. Lee: A life. Knopf.
- Launius, R. D. (1997). Alexander William Doniphan: Portrait of a Missouri moderate. University of Missouri Press.
- Nevins, A. (1939). Frémont, pathmarker of the West. D. Appleton-Century.
- Ohrt, W. (1997). Defiant peacemaker: Nicholas Trist in the Mexican War. Texas A&M University Press.
- Pryor, E. B. (2007). Reading the man: A portrait of Robert E. Lee through his private letters. Viking.
- Robertson, J. I., Jr. (1997). Stonewall Jackson: The man, the soldier, the legend. Macmillan.
- Rolle, A. (1991). John Charles Fremont: Character as destiny. University of Oklahoma Press.
- Sears, S. W. (1988). George B. McClellan: The young Napoleon. Ticknor & Fields.
- Smith, J. E. (2001). Grant. Simon & Schuster.
- Spencer, I. D. (1959). The victor and the spoils: A life of William L. Marcy. Brown University Press.
- Thomas, E. M. (1995). Robert E. Lee: A biography. W. W. Norton.
- Wert, J. D. (1993). General James Longstreet: The Confederacy's most controversial soldier—A biography. Simon & Schuster.
- White, R. C. (2016). American Ulysses: A life of Ulysses S. Grant. Random House.
- Williams, T. H. (1955). P. G. T. Beauregard: Napoleon in gray. Louisiana State University Press.

=== United States political figures ===
- Bartlett, I. H. (1993). John C. Calhoun: A biography. W. W. Norton.
- Baxter, M. G. (1984). One and inseparable: Daniel Webster and the Union. Belknap Press of Harvard University Press.
- Burlingame, M. (2008). Abraham Lincoln: A life. Johns Hopkins University Press.
- Chambers, W. N. (1956). Old Bullion Benton, senator from the New West: Thomas Hart Benton, 1782–1858. Little, Brown.
- Donald, D. H. (1995). Lincoln. Simon & Schuster.
- Drexler, R. W. (1991). Guilty of making peace: A biography of Nicholas P. Trist. University Press of America.
- Heidler, D. S., & Heidler, J. T. (2010). Henry Clay: The essential American. Random House.
- Klein, P. S. (1962). President James Buchanan: A biography. Pennsylvania State University Press.
- Niven, J. (1988). John C. Calhoun and the price of union: A biography. Louisiana State University Press.
- Ohrt, W. (1997). Defiant peacemaker: Nicholas Trist in the Mexican War. Texas A&M University Press.
- Remini, R. V. (1991). Henry Clay: Statesman for the Union. W. W. Norton.
- Remini, R. V. (1997). Daniel Webster: The man and his time. W. W. Norton.
- Smith, E. B. (1958). Magnificent Missourian: The life of Thomas Hart Benton. J. B. Lippincott.

== Historiography and memory ==
- Bender, A. (2003). Irish-Mexican solidarity and the San Patricio Battalion flag. Genre, 36(3–4), 271–293. doi:10.1215/00166928-36-3-4-271
- Graebner, N. A. (1978). Lessons of the Mexican War. Pacific Historical Review, 47(3), 325–342. JSTOR 3637470
- Griswold del Castillo, R. (1986). Mexican views of 1848: The Treaty of Guadalupe Hidalgo through Mexican history. Journal of Borderlands Studies, 1(2), 24–40. doi:10.1080/08865655.1986.9695326
- Harstad, P. T., & Resh, R. W. (1964). The causes of the Mexican War: A note on changing interpretations. Arizona and the West, 6(4), 289–302. JSTOR 40167859
- Johannsen, R. W. (1985). To the halls of the Montezumas: The Mexican War in the American imagination. Oxford University Press.
- Robinson, C. (Ed.). (1989). The view from Chapultepec: Mexican writers on the Mexican-American War. University of Arizona Press.
- Ruiz, R. E. (Ed.). (1963). The Mexican War: Was it manifest destiny? Holt, Rinehart and Winston.
- Streeby, S. (2002). American sensations: Class, empire, and the production of popular culture. University of California Press.
- Van Wagenen, M. S. (2012). Remembering the forgotten war: The enduring legacies of the U.S.-Mexican War. University of Massachusetts Press.

== Primary sources ==
- Alcaraz, R., et al. (1850). The other side: Or, notes for the history of the war between Mexico and the United States (A. C. Ramsey, Trans.). John Wiley.
- Ballentine, G. (1854). Autobiography of an English soldier in the United States Army: Comprising observations and adventures in the States and Mexico. Stringer & Townsend.
- Chamberlain, S. E. (1996). My confession: Recollections of a rogue. Texas State Historical Association.
- Doubleday, A. (1998). My life in the old army: The reminiscences of Abner Doubleday from the collections of the New-York Historical Society (J. E. Chance, Ed.). Texas Christian University Press.
- Emory, W. H. (1848). Notes of a military reconnoissance, from Fort Leavenworth, in Missouri, to San Diego, in California, including parts of the Arkansas, Del Norte, and Gila rivers. Wendell and Van Benthuysen.
- Gibson, G. R. (1935). Journal of a soldier under Kearny and Doniphan, 1846–1847 (R. P. Bieber, Ed.). Arthur H. Clark Company.
- Grant, U. S. (1885–1886). Personal memoirs of U. S. Grant. Charles L. Webster & Company.
- Henry, W. S. (1847). Campaign sketches of the war with Mexico. Harper & Brothers.
- Hitchcock, E. A. (1909). Fifty years in camp and field: Diary of Major-General Ethan Allen Hitchcock, U.S.A. (W. A. Croffut, Ed.). G. P. Putnam's Sons.
- Kendall, G. W. (1999). Dispatches from the Mexican War (L. D. Cress, Ed.). University of Oklahoma Press.
- Lincoln, A. (1953). Speech in the United States House of Representatives: The war with Mexico, 12 January 1848. In R. P. Basler (Ed.), The collected works of Abraham Lincoln (Vol. 1, pp. 431–442). Rutgers University Press.
- Magoffin, S. S. (1926). Down the Santa Fé Trail and into Mexico: The diary of Susan Shelby Magoffin, 1846–1847 (S. M. Drumm, Ed.). Yale University Press.
- Oswandel, J. J. (2010). Notes of the Mexican War, 1846–1848 (T. D. Johnson & N. C. Hughes Jr., Eds.). University of Tennessee Press.
- Polk, J. K. (1910). The diary of James K. Polk during his presidency, 1845 to 1849 (M. M. Quaife, Ed.). A. C. McClurg and Company.
- Ramírez, J. F. (1950). Mexico during the war with the United States (W. V. Scholes, Ed.; E. B. Scherr, Trans.). University of Missouri.
- Robinson, C. (Ed. & Trans.). (1989). The view from Chapultepec: Mexican writers on the Mexican-American War. University of Arizona Press.
- Santa Anna, A. L. de. (1967). The eagle: The autobiography of Santa Anna (A. F. Crawford, Ed.). Pemberton Press.
- Scott, W. (1864). Memoirs of Lieut.-General Scott, LL.D., written by himself. Sheldon & Company.
- Smith, G. W., & Judah, C. (Eds.). (1968). Chronicles of the gringos: The U.S. Army in the Mexican War, 1846–1848; Accounts of eyewitnesses and combatants. University of New Mexico Press.
- Thoreau, H. D. (1849). Resistance to civil government. In E. P. Peabody (Ed.), Aesthetic papers (pp. 189–211). The Editor; G. P. Putnam.
- Treaty of peace, friendship, limits, and settlement between the United States of America and the Mexican Republic (Treaty of Guadalupe Hidalgo), U.S.–Mex., February 2, 1848, 9 Stat. 922.
- Wislizenus, A. (1848). Memoir of a tour to northern Mexico, connected with Col. Doniphan's expedition, in 1846 and 1847. Tippin & Streeper.

== See also ==
- Outline of the Mexican American War
- Timeline of the Mexican American War
- Mexico–United States border
- Mexico–United States relations
- Republic of Texas–United States relations
- Nueces Strip
- Texan raids on New Mexico (1843)
- Compromise of 1850
- Reconquista (Mexico)
- List of United States invasions of Latin American countries
