= Peter Brimelow =

American white supremacist (born 1947)

- Born: October 13, 1947 (age 79); Warrington, Lancashire, England
- Citizenship: United States
- Occupations: Financial journalist, columnist, writer
- Known for: Opposition to immigration: Founding of VDARE
- Movement: White nationalism; White supremacy; Alt-right
- Spouse(s): Margaret Alice Laws (m. 1980; died 2004) Lydia E. Sullivan (m. 2007)

Peter Brimelow (born October 13, 1947) is a British-born American writer. He is the founder of the website VDARE, an anti-immigration site associated with white supremacy, white nationalism, and the alt-right.

Brimelow has worked as a writer and editor at National Review and as a columnist for Dow Jones’ MarketWatch. He founded the Center for American Unity in 1999 and served as its first president. Brimelow describes himself as a paleoconservative, and he has been called a leader within the alt-right movement. In January 2021, a judge dismissed a lawsuit Brimelow brought against The New York Times, ruling that that the Times had not defamed him by calling him a "white nationalist". Courts subsequently reaffirmed in 2022 and 2026 that the NYT had not defamed Brimelow.

== Early life and education ==
Brimelow was born in 1947 in Warrington, Lancashire, England, the son of Bessie (née Knox) and Frank Sanderson Brimelow, a transport executive.

Brimelow is an American citizen.

== Career ==
After working as a securities analyst, Brimelow moved to Toronto to work as a business writer and editor at the Financial Post and Maclean's.

In 1990, Brimelow and Leslie Spencer's Forbes article, "The Litigation Scandal", won a Gerald Loeb Award in the "Magazine" category.

== Views and publications ==
Brimelow opposes both illegal and legal immigration. He has described immigrants who speak Spanish as "completely dysfunctional" and that California used to be a "paradise" but was "rapidly turning into Hispanic slum". and a white supremacist. In 2020, Brimelow sued The New York Times for labeling him a "white nationalist"; the case was dismissed later the same year. In 2022, Brimelow called for a reversal of Brown v. Board of Education, a 1954 Supreme Court decision that directed an end to segregated schools.

Brimelow has appeared as a guest on The Political Cesspool, a "pro-white" talk radio show. Following the 2008 presidential election, Brimelow advocated that to win, the Republican Party should focus on "white votes".

As of 2010 he was a senior contributing editor at Alternative Right, a website edited by Richard Spencer, according to the SPLC. He has spoken at events hosted by the National Policy Institute run by Spencer, according to the SPLC.

Brimelow appeared on a panel discussing multiculturalism during the 2012 Conservative Political Action Conference (CPAC 2012), and gave a talk titled "The Failure of Multiculturalism: How the pursuit of diversity is weakening the American Identity". In the face of condemnation from MSNBC and PFTAW, Al Cardenas of the American Conservative Union denied knowing Brimelow.

Larry Auster, also a prominent immigration restrictionist, was a fierce critic of Brimelow's approach to the issue. For example, Auster criticized Brimelow's promotion of the views of antisemitic conspiracy theorist Kevin MacDonald in the following manner: "The views of Alex Linder are not fundamentally different from those of Kevin MacDonald, who is published by Peter Brimelow and Richard Spencer. The only real difference between Linder and MacDonald is that Linder explicitly touts his goal of removing all Jews from the earth, while in MacDonald's case the same goal is implicit."

According to Anti-Immigration in the United States, Brimelow believes that whites built American culture and should defend it against non-whites who would try to change it.

=== Alien Nation ===
External videos
- Booknotes interview with Brimelow on Alien Nation, June 11, 1995, C-SPAN

Brimelow's book Alien Nation: Common Sense About America's Immigration Disaster criticizes U.S. immigration policy after 1965.

A review in Foreign Affairs acknowledged that the book raised a number of persuasive objections to contemporary American immigration policies, but criticized Brimelow for "defining American identity in racial as opposed to cultural terms", and for the "extreme character" of his proposals.

The Southern Poverty Law Center described Alien Nation as an "infamous anti-immigrant book", and pointed to Center for Immigration Studies executive director Mark Krikorian's positive review of the book as evidence that Krikorian's organization had close ties to white nationalists.

=== The Worm in the Apple ===
External videos
- Presentation by Brimelow on The Worm in the Apple, February 24, 2003, C-SPAN

The Worm in the Apple discusses public education and teachers' unions, considering unions as "highly destructive". David Gordon summarizes Brimelow's view in his review of the book in The Mises Review: "to attempt so far-reaching a goal as universal high school education is foolish." John O'Sullivan praised the book. For the Hoover Institution journal Education Next, public policy consultant George Mitchell wrote: "Brimelow... demonstrates how collective bargaining for teachers has produced labor agreements that stifle innovation and risk taking. He makes it clear that the dramatic rise in influence enjoyed by the teacher unions has coincided with stagnant and unacceptable levels of student performance." However, in the same journal article, education consultant Julia E. Koppich took a more critical angle: "Brimelow uses a variety of linguistic devices to drive home his points. But his over-the-top language soon grates on the nerves... His argument is not that teacher unions are destroying American education, but that they labor long and hard to preserve the status quo... But this book contains so little about education-virtually nothing about classrooms, schools, or districts-even that point gets lost." Koppich called the book "an anti-public school polemic".

=== The Patriot Game ===
In a 2011 article in Maclean's, John M. Geddes stated that Brimelow's book The Patriot Game: National Dreams and Political Realities "offered a bracingly of-the-moment conservative critique of Canada," and said that it was instrumental in shaping the thought process of Canadian Prime Minister Stephen Harper.

=== VDARE ===
VDARE was an American far-right website promoting opposition to immigration to the United States. It is associated with white supremacy, white nationalism, and the alt-right. Anti-Immigration in the United States: A Historical Encyclopedia describes VDARE as "one of the most prolific anti-immigration media outlets in the United States" and states that it is "broadly concerned with race issues in the United States". Brimelow established VDARE in 1999 and served as its editor.

The Southern Poverty Law Center (SPLC) has described Brimelow's website VDARE as a hate group, that was "once a relatively mainstream anti-immigration page", but by 2003 became "a meeting place for many on the radical right". VDARE has also been described by the Anti-Defamation League as a racist and anti-immigrant publication.

In 2024, Brimelow suspended the operations of VDARE in response to legal scrutiny from the state of New York, and in August 2025, state attorney general Letitia James sued VDARE alleging that $1.4 million had been taken from VDARE by Brimelow and his wife, using the funds to buy the Samuel Taylor Suit Cottage, in West Virginia.

== Personal life ==
Brimelow's first wife was Margaret Alice "Maggy" Laws, a native of Newfoundland, Canada who worked for the Manhattan Institute for Policy Research when they met in New York. They were married until her death on February 6, 2004, from cancer. Brimelow had two children with Laws, Alexander and Hannah Claire. As of June 2021, Hannah is a blogger for right-wing political commentator Tim Pool's website Timcast.

In 2007, Brimelow married Lydia Sullivan. While Lydia claims to have started working for VDARE in 2014, tax documents associated with the VDARE Foundation listed her as a business partner as early as 2008. As of 2020, she was the president of the VDARE Foundation and the publisher of VDARE.com.

== Writings ==
- The Wall Street Gurus: How You Can Profit from Investment Newsletters (1st ed.). New York City: Random House. 1986. ISBN 0-394-54202-9. LCCN 85028153.
- The Patriot Game: National Dreams and Political Realities. Toronto, Ontario, Canada: Key Porter Books. 1986. ISBN 1-55013-001-3. LCCN 86228891.
  - Also published as The Patriot Game: Canada and the Canadian Question Revisited. Stanford, CA: Hoover Institution Press. 1987. ISBN 0-8179-8681-2. LCCN 87017145.
- The Enemies of Freedom. Toronto, Ontario, Canada: Citizens for Foreign Aid Reform. 1990. LCCN 92219523.
- Alien Nation: Common Sense About America's Immigration Disaster (1st ed.). New York, NY: Random House. 1995. ISBN 0-679-43058-X. LCCN 94012478.
  - Also see: letter to the editor, responding to critics – Brimelow, Peter (June 27, 1995). "Immigration and Bad Social Policies Don't Mix; A White Ethnic Core". The New York Times.
- The Worm in the Apple: How the Teacher Unions Are Destroying American Education. New York, NY: HarperCollins. 2003. ISBN 0-06-009661-6. LCCN 2002027586.
