= Taki's Magazine =

Political online magazine

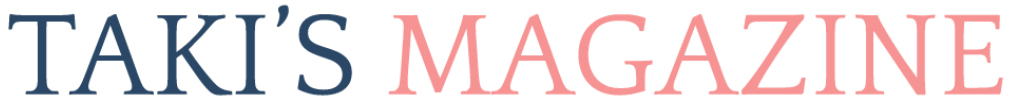
- Available in: English
- Headquarters: {{{location_country}}}
- Owner: The American Conservative (since 2026)
- Website: www.takimag.com
- Launched: February 5, 2007; 19 years ago
- Current status: Active

Taki's Magazine, called Takimag for short, is an online magazine of politics and culture published by the Greek paleoconservative writer Taki Theodoracopulos. Initially called Taki's Top Drawer, the site was redesigned and relaunched under its current title in March 2008 with a subsequent redesign in 2010. It was acquired by The American Conservative in April 2026.

Formerly edited by his daughter Mandolyna Theodoracopulos, it has published articles by right-wing and far-right figures including Pat Buchanan, Ann Coulter, John Stossel, Steve Sailer, Gavin McInnes, Jared Taylor, and Richard Spencer; as well as in support of the Greek far-right political party Golden Dawn.

== History ==
Founded on 5 February 2007, the intent of the site, according to Theodoracopulos, was to "shake up the stodgy world of so-called 'conservative' opinion." Theodoracopulos said: "Takimag is a libertarian webzine. We believe the best stories are smart, cheeky, and culturally relevant. We take our politics like we take life—lightly." Theodoracopulos, a "New York society gadfly", the playboy son of a Greek shipping magnate, and co-founder of The American Conservative, had been a controversial columnist in publications like The Spectator, and noted for his use of racial and ethnic slurs. Taki's Magazine drew note for its inclusion of white nationalist and white supremacist authors. Vox called it "openly racist" in 2016. New York magazine in 2017 said Taki's appealed to "hepcat paleoconservatives and cosmopolitan racists".

Taki's Magazine had Richard Spencer as its editor for about two years, through 2009; Spencer's tenure played a role in marshaling and naming what would eventually become the alt-right. Using the headline "The Decline and Rise of the Alternative Right", Taki's under Spencer published a 2008 speech by Paul Gottfried to the H.L. Mencken Club, a group Gottfried had formed with Spencer's help that year. The magazine also began to use the phrase "alternative right" frequently in other articles about the development of a new, less neo-conservative, more racialist politics emerging in the conservative movement. This term was later adopted and shortened to "alt-right".

John Derbyshire was fired by National Review in 2012 after he wrote a derogatory column for Taki's Magazine responding to "the talk" given by American black parents to their children.

Gavin McInnes' Taki's column, which began around 2011, made casual use of racial and anti-gay slurs, as described by the Southern Poverty Law Center. In 2016, McInnes announced on the Taki's website the founding of his neo-fascist street-fighting group the Proud Boys.

Taki's published articles by Theodoracopulos in support of the Greek far-right political party Golden Dawn.

In January 2026, Taki's daughter resigned as the editor of the magazine, citing personal reasons. In April 2026, the magazine was acquired by The American Conservative.
