= Free Harvard, Fair Harvard =

"Free Harvard, Fair Harvard" was a campaign centered on electing a slate of candidates to the Harvard Board of Overseers started by Ron Unz in 2016. Along with Unz, the candidates included Lee Cheng, Stuart Taylor, Jr., Stephen Hsu, and Ralph Nader. None of the candidates were elected to the board. The campaign sought for tuition fees at Harvard to be abolished and for greater transparency in the admissions process.
