= Ron Unz =

American entrepreneur and conservative activist (born 1961)

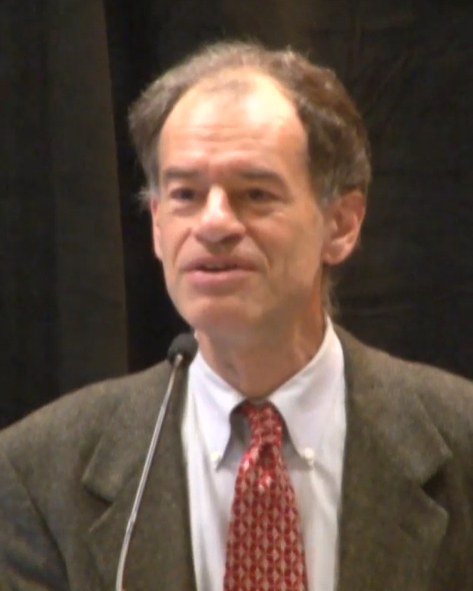
- Unz at a 2013 New America symposium
- Born: Ronald Keeva Unz; September 20, 1961 (age 65); Los Angeles, California, US
- Education: Harvard University (AB); University of Cambridge; Stanford University
- Occupations: Businessman, political activist, writer
- Political party: Republican

Ronald Keeva Unz (/ʌnz/; born September 20, 1961) is an American technology entrepreneur, conservative political activist, writer, and publisher. A former businessman, Unz became a financial software multi-millionaire before entering politics. He unsuccessfully ran for governor as a Republican in the 1994 California gubernatorial election and for U.S. Senator in 2016. He has sponsored multiple ballot propositions promoting structured English immersion education as well as campaign finance reform and minimum wage increases.

Unz was publisher of The American Conservative from 2007 to 2013, and since 2013 has been publisher and editor of The Unz Review, a website which self-describes as presenting "controversial perspectives largely excluded from the American mainstream media." Unz Review has been criticized by the Anti-Defamation League for hosting racist and antisemitic content, and the Southern Poverty Law Center has labeled it a white nationalist publication. Unz has also drawn criticism for funding VDARE and other publications accused of white supremacism.

== Early life and career ==
Ronald Keeva Unz was born in Los Angeles, California, on September 20, 1961, to a Ukrainian family of Jewish descent. His family migrated to America in the 20th century and was raised household in North Hollywood. His mother was an anti-war activist who raised her son as a single mother. Unz has said that his childhood as a fatherless child in a single-parent household which received public assistance, was a source of "embarrassment and discomfort".

He attended North Hollywood High School and, in his senior year won first place in the 1979 Westinghouse Science Talent Search. He attended Harvard University, graduating in 1983 with a Bachelor of Arts degree in physics and ancient history. In 1985, he published a note in The Journal of Hellenic Studies arguing that that Alexander the Great had younger brothers whom he murdered when he came to the throne. He then took graduate courses in physics at the University of Cambridge and began a Ph.D. at Stanford University before abandoning the program.

Unz worked in the banking industry and wrote software for mortgage securities during his studies. In 1988, he founded the company Wall Street Analytics in New York City, moving it to Palo Alto, California, five years later. In 2006, the company was acquired by the ratings firm Moody's.

== Political career ==
Unz made an unsuccessful bid for the Republican nomination in the 1994 California gubernatorial election, challenging incumbent Pete Wilson. He ran as a conservative alternative to the more moderate Wilson and was endorsed by the conservative California Republican Assembly. He came in second place to Wilson, receiving 707,431 votes (34.3 percent). Newspapers referred to Unz's candidacy as a Revenge of the Nerds and often quoted his claim of a 214 IQ.

In 1998, Unz sponsored California Proposition 227, which aimed to change the state's bilingual education to an opt-in structured English-language educational system. It was approved by the voters despite opposition from language education researchers. Proposition 227 did not seek to end bilingual education since special exemptions were made for students to remain in an English immersion class if a parent so desires. However, there were limits (such as age restrictions) for the exemptions, and there were provisions to discipline teachers who refused to teach solely or predominantly in English. Proposition 227 was approved in 1998, but repealed by Proposition 58 in 2016. In 2002, Unz backed a similar initiative, the Massachusetts English Language Education in Public Schools Initiative, which was approved by 61.25% of the voters. He also supported ballot initiatives in other states including Arizona Proposition 203 and Colorado Amendment 31.

In early 1999, Unz introduced a campaign-finance reform ballot initiative known as the California Voters Bill of Rights (Proposition 25). Co-sponsored by California Democrat Tony Miller and endorsed by Senator John McCain, the proposal would have required campaign contributions greater than $1,000 to be declared online within 24 hours, limited individual contributions to $5,000, banned corporate contributions to candidates, and permitted statewide candidates to raise funds only within the 12 months before an election. In late 1999, Unz briefly entered the U.S. Senate race to challenge incumbent Dianne Feinstein, declaring his candidacy in October and dropping out by December to focus on fundraising for Proposition 25, which was ultimately defeated in the March 2000 primary election.

In 2012 and 2014, Unz worked on a ballot initiative to raise the California minimum wage from $10 to $12, but his campaign failed. His proposal was supported by economist James K. Galbraith.

In 2016, Unz organized the "Free Harvard, Fair Harvard" campaign, a slate of five candidates campaigning for spots on the Harvard Board of Overseers, the governing board of Harvard University. The slate included himself, journalist Stuart Taylor Jr., physicist Stephen Hsu, consumer advocate Ralph Nader, and lawyer Lee C. Cheng. The campaign sought for tuition fees at Harvard to be abolished and for greater transparency in the admissions process. None of the five candidates were elected to the 30-person board.

Unz campaigned on a Republican ticket in California in the 2016 primaries for election to the US Senate intending to succeed Democrat Barbara Boxer. Having previously supported immigration, he now proposed it "should be sharply reduced, probably by 50% or more." Though not hoping to win the nomination, he put himself forward in an attempt to challenge the then proposed repeal of Proposition 227. He was endorsed by former U.S. Representative Ron Paul. In the final result, he gained 64,698 votes (1.3%).

== Writing and publishing ==
=== The American Conservative and the "Asian quota" controversy ===
An investor in The American Conservative, he was its publisher from 2007 to 2013. He also contributed opinion articles on topics such as immigration, the minimum wage, and urban crime. In an email leaked to National Review magazine, editor Daniel McCarthy wrote that Unz was acting as if he were the editor of The American Conservative and threatened to resign if the publication's board did not support him over Unz.

In 2012, Unz published an article in The American Conservative entitled "The Myth of American Meritocracy". He argued Ivy League universities held an unspoken Asian quota limiting spots granted to Asian students similar to earlier Jewish quotas, and that Jewish students were over-represented at a greater rate than merit would suggest. The article said that the "massive apparent bias" could be attributed to unconscious bias from Jewish administrators at those universities. His argument that an Asian race-based quota existed in the Ivy League was reproduced in a subsequent New York Times special debate feature, "Fears of an Asian Quota in the Ivy League". Unz's admissions analysis was contested by academics at Yale, who showed that his data "grossly underestimates the proportion of Asian-Americans". Unz's writings on Ivy League admissions were praised by white supremacist David Duke who said it confirmed Harvard was "now under powerful Jewish influence". The noted antisemite Kevin B. MacDonald said it was similar to his own view that Jews are "at odds with the values of the great majority of non-Jewish White Americans."

=== The Unz Archive ===
Unz also compiled the Unz Archive (UNZ.org), a searchable online collection of periodicals, books, and video, that by 2012 held around 25,000 issues of over 120 publications, including The American Mercury, The Literary Digest, Inquiry, Collier's, Marxism Today, New Politics, and various pulp fiction and romance magazines. Nick Gillespie of Reason called it "one of the Web's great archive projects".

=== The Unz Review ===
In November 2013, Unz launched the website The Unz Review for which he serves as editor-in-chief and publisher.

The Unz Review describes itself as presenting "controversial perspectives largely excluded from the American mainstream media." Unz says he mostly posts articles that have already been published, and "I don't even read most of the articles I publish, and I certainly don't edit them. I'm busy." It has been described by the Associated Press as "a hodgepodge of views from corners of both the left and right" and by the New York Times as "far right". According to the Anti-Defamation League (ADL) in 2014, the webzine is an "outlet for certain writers to attack Israel and Jews". The Southern Poverty Law Center has labeled it a white nationalist publication. In 2016, a research fellow at the ADL said "I haven't seen Ron Unz write anything anti-Semitic himself, but he really gives a platform to anti-Semites."

=== Holocaust denial and antisemitism ===
The Unz Foundation, of which he is president, has donated to individuals and organizations which are alleged by the ADL to have published or expressed opinions that are antisemitic or anti-Israel. In 2009, 2010 and 2011, it gave $108,000 to Paul Craig Roberts, $74,000 to Philip Giraldi, $75,000 to Norman Finkelstein, $80,000 to CounterPunch and $60,000 to Philip Weiss, co-editor of the Mondoweiss website. In addition, the Unz Foundation has given grants to Alison Weir, founder of If Americans Knew. He has donated tens of thousands of dollars to VDARE, which he admits is a "quasi-white nationalist" website, but has said "they write interesting things".

Since their 2014 article, the ADL commented in October 2018 that Unz "has embraced hardcore anti-Semitism", "denied the Holocaust", and "endorsed the claim that Jews consume the blood of non-Jews", referring to blood libel. In July 2018, in articles for The Unz Review, he wrote about the claims in the Czarist forgery The Protocols of the Elders of Zion and Henry Ford's The International Jew. Ford's work, a series of antisemitic pamphlets published in the 1920s, appeared to Unz to be "quite plausible and factually-oriented, even sometimes overly cautious in their presentation". He partly accepted the standard consensus on the Protocols but believes they were assembled by "someone who was generally familiar with the secretive machinations of elite international Jews against the existing governments ... who drafted the document to outline his view of their strategic plans."

In August 2018, Unz made use of Holocaust denial arguments and wrote, "I think it far more likely than not that the standard Holocaust narrative is at least substantially false, and quite possibly, almost entirely so." That same year, The Unz Review published material written by Holocaust denier Kevin Barrett, while Unz himself defended David Irving, who lost his libel case against Deborah Lipstadt. Unz also implied that Mossad was involved in the murders of President John F. Kennedy and his brother Robert. Writing about the 2001 September 11 attacks in a September 2018 article for his Review, Unz stated: "the vast weight of the evidence clearly points in a single direction, implicating Israel and its Mossad intelligence service, with the case being overwhelmingly strong in motive, means, and opportunity."

=== Collection of essays ===
In 2016, Unz self-published The Myth of American Meritocracy and Other Essays, a hardcover collection of most of his writings, including nearly all of his print articles.

=== Other ===
Unz provided a $600,000 grant for research in evolutionary biology to Gregory Cochran, an anthropologist who argued that homosexuality may be caused by a "gay germ". Ralph Nader, while running with Unz for Harvard Board of Overseers called him "a very nuanced guy. He should not be stereotyped as a lot of the world of identity politics does."
