= Lawrence Auster =

American essayist (1949–2013)

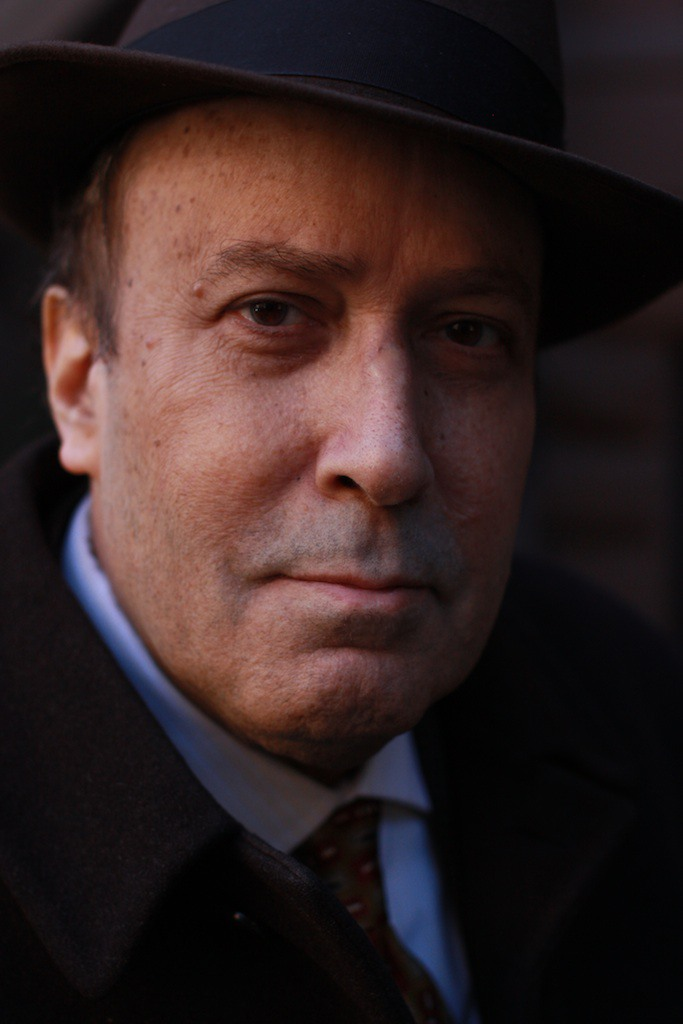
- Born: January 26, 1949
- Died: March 29, 2013 (aged 64); West Chester, Pennsylvania, U.S.
- Education: Columbia University; University of Colorado Boulder (BA)
- Occupation: Essayist
- Relatives: Paul Auster (cousin)
- Website: www.amnation.com/vfr/

Lawrence Auster (January 26, 1949 – March 29, 2013) was an American conservative essayist and self-described "racialist” who wrote on immigration and multiculturalism.

== Personal life ==
Auster grew up in New Jersey, and was a cousin of the novelist Paul Auster. He attended Columbia University for two years, later finishing a B.A. in English at the University of Colorado at Boulder. He never married, and was not – as has been claimed – a lawyer.

Born Jewish, Auster converted to Christianity as an adult and became a member of the Episcopal Church, a church he said he preferred "in the historical rather than the present tense", because the Church's ordination of openly gay men means "it has ceased being a Christian church". He died of pancreatic cancer in West Chester, Pennsylvania on March 29, 2013. Auster later converted to Roman Catholicism on his deathbed.

== Writings ==
Auster was the author of several works on immigration and multiculturalism, most notably The Path to National Suicide, originally published by the American Immigration Control Foundation (AICF) in 1990. The book calls for greater public debate about U.S. immigration policy and the “orthodoxy” that upholds it. In Alien Nation: Common Sense About America's Immigration Disaster, Peter Brimelow refers to Path as "perhaps the most remarkable literary product of the Restrictionist underground, a work which I think will one day be seen as a political pamphlet to rank with Tom Paine's Common Sense." Professor Gabriel Chin has called Auster "the unsung godfather of the restrictionist movement".

Auster's work appeared in numerous publications, including National Review, FrontPage Magazine, Human Events, WorldNetDaily and The Social Contract.

Auster edited a daily blog, View from the Right (VFR). He took over editorship from writer James Kalb. Auster published his final post on March 24, 2013.

== Political views ==
Auster identified his political views as traditionalist conservative. He opposed what he described as the liberalism of modern Western civilization. His interests were primarily social policy, particularly the politics of gender, sex, religion, sexuality, culture, patriotism, and identity.

Auster wrote, “I have always called myself a racialist, which to me means two things. First, as a general proposition, I think that race matters in all kinds of ways. Second, I care about the white race. It is the source of and is inseparable from everything we are, everything we have, and everything our civilization has achieved.” He did not self-identify as a white nationalist. As a tactical matter, Auster accepted the conventional definition of racism as having “the connotation of the morally bad, of oppression and hatred.”

The Southern Poverty Law Center (SPLC) implied that Auster was a racist because he spoke at an American Renaissance conference, delivering a speech entitled “Multiculturalism and the War Against White America.” He was one of ten speakers to address the magazine's first conference in 1994, but did not speak there afterward. He criticized Jared Taylor for tolerating the former Klansman David Duke and Stormfront moderator Jamie Kelso, who attended the conference and asked questions. Auster still supported Taylor's personal views as well as those of the late Samuel T. Francis, another frequent speaker for the conferences.

Auster was an occasional contributor to FrontPage Magazine until 2007 when the publication cut its ties with him over an article he wrote in which he complained that “each story of black on white rape is reported in isolation, not presented as part of a larger pattern” and that “white women in this country are being targeted by black rapists”. Responding to his exclusion from FrontPage Magazine, Auster claimed that editor David Horowitz had “behaved in the most outrageously politically correct manner I've ever seen in my life.”
