= Robert W. Merry =

American journalist

Robert Merry
- Born: March 5, 1946 (age 79); Tacoma, Washington, U.S.
- Education: University of Washington; Columbia University
- Occupation: Journalist
- Board member of: American Ideas Institute
- Spouse: Susan Merry
- Children: 3

Robert W. Merry (born March 5, 1946) is an American journalist, publishing executive and commentator.

== Early life ==
Robert W. Merry was born in 1946 in Tacoma, WA. He served three years in the U.S. Army, including two years as a counterintelligence special agent in West Germany. He graduated from the University of Washington with a bachelor's degree in journalism in 1968 and earned a master's degree from the Columbia University Graduate School of Journalism in 1972.

== Career ==
Merry started his career as a reporter for The Denver Post and became a Washington-based political reporter in 1974 when he joined the staff of the National Observer, a Dow Jones weekly newspaper. When the Observer folded in 1977, he became a reporter for The Wall Street Journal, and spent twelve years there covering Congress, national politics, and the White House, among other beats.

Merry became managing editor of Congressional Quarterly in 1987. He was promoted to executive editor in 1990 and became president and editor-in-chief in 1997. He held that position until The Economist purchased CQ in 2009. Merry served as editor of The National Interest from 2011 to 2013, and as editor of The American Conservative from 2016 to 2018.

Merry is the author of five books.

== Works ==
- Merry, Robert W. (1996). Taking On the World: Joseph and Stewart Alsop -- Guardians of the American Century. New York: Penguin Books. ISBN 9780140149845.
- Merry, Robert W. (2005). Sands of Empire: Missionary Zeal, American Foreign Policy, and the Hazards of Global Ambition. New York: Simon & Schuster. ISBN 9780743266673.
- Merry, Robert W. (2009). A Country of Vast Designs: James K. Polk, the Mexican War, and the Conquest of the American Continent. New York: Simon & Schuster. ISBN 9780743297448.
- Merry, Robert W. (2012). Where They Stand: The American Presidents in the Eyes of Voters and Historians. New York: Simon & Schuster. ISBN 9781451625424.
- Merry, Robert W. (2017). President McKinley : Architect of the American Century. New York: Simon & Schuster. ISBN 9781451625448.
- Merry, Robert W. (2024). Decade of Disunion: How Massachusetts and South Carolina Led the Way to Civil War, 1849-1861. New York: Simon & Schuster. ISBN 9781982176495.
