= Taki Theodoracopulos =

Greek writer and publisher (born 1936)

- Παναγιώτης Θεοδωρακόπουλος
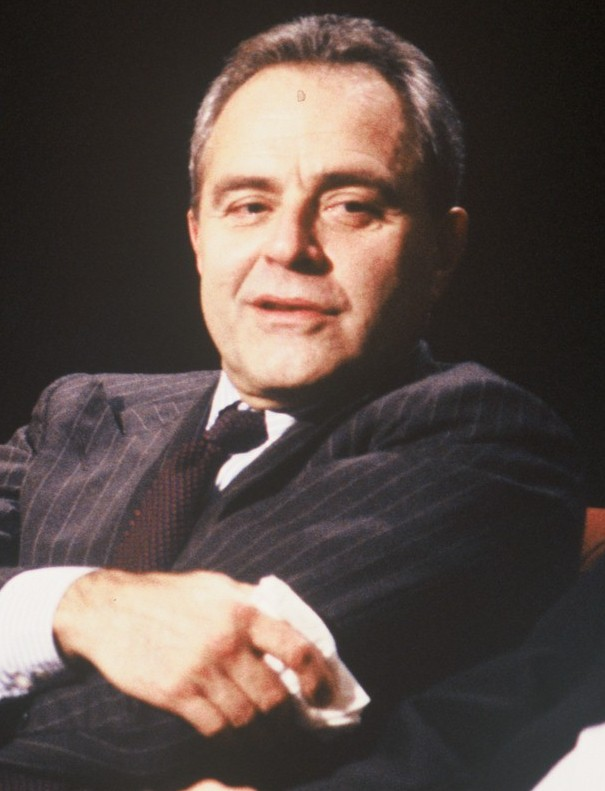
- Theodoracopulos on TV show After Dark in 1991
- Born: Panagiotis Theodoracopulos; 11 August 1936 (age 90); Greece
- Education: University of Virginia; Lawrenceville School; Blair Academy
- Occupations: Journalist; publisher; writer

Panagiotis "Taki" Theodoracopulos (/ˌθiːədɔːrəˈkɒpələs/; Greek: Παναγιώτης "Τάκης" Θεοδωρακόπουλος [panaˈʝotis ˈtacis θeoðoraˈkopulos]; born 11 August 1936) is a Greek paleoconservative writer and publisher who founded Taki's Magazine and co-founded The American Conservative. His column "High Life" appeared in British weekly The Spectator from 1977 to 2023. He has lived in New York City, London (at one point owning a property on Cadogan Square), and Gstaad in Switzerland.

== Early life and education ==
Panagiotis Theodoracopulos was born on 11 August 1936. The son of a Greek shipping magnate, Theodoracopulos was privately educated in the United States at Lawrenceville School and Blair Academy before attending the University of Virginia.

Theodoracopulos was a sportsman early in life. He represented Greece at the FIS Nordic World Ski Championships 1962, having been a tennis player beforehand, including playing at the 1961 French Championship.

== Career ==
Theodoracopulos's column "High Life" appeared in British weekly The Spectator between 1977 and 2023, expressing sometimes controversial opinions, including the claim that black people had lower IQs than other people, for which Boris Johnson, made editor in 1999, later apologised. He has also written for other US and UK publications, including Esquire, Hamptons Magazine, Newsweek, the New York Press, The Sunday Times, and Vanity Fair.

In 2002, Theodoracopulos founded The American Conservative magazine with Pat Buchanan and Scott McConnell. He was also the publisher of the British magazine Right Now! He currently publishes and writes for Taki's Magazine. In 2016, the organization Proud Boys was launched with an article in Taki's Magazine by Gavin McInnes.

In 2004, The Guardian criticised Theodoracopulos for expressing racist views directed against West Indians, Puerto Ricans, and Jews, among others. He has used the racial epithets "nigger" and "Sambo" to describe black people and he referred to Saudi royal family members as "ruling towelheads".

Theodoracopulos appeared in the 2013 James Toback film Seduced and Abandoned as himself.

In 2013, Theodoracopulos wrote in support of the Greek far-right political party Golden Dawn, describing them as "good old-fashioned patriotic Greeks". Following criticism, the editor of The Spectator, Fraser Nelson, defended Theodoracopulos by tweeting that "Our readers like diversity and well-written pieces that they disagree with. We have no party line." In a 2021 interview, months after many Golden Dawn leaders were convicted by Greek courts for heading a criminal organisation, the chairman of The Spectator, Andrew Neil, who does not have influence over the magazine editorially, condemned the column, stating it was "beyond the pale". He further added that he had requested the editor to inform Theodoracopulos that he should not return to that topic following its publication.

In December 2025, he wrote his final monthly column for Chronicles. His last weekly column for The Spectator was in 2023.

== Views ==
Theodoracopulos has criticized both radical feminism and "extreme masculinity". He has criticized the British royal family, while also supporting monarchism. He has listed Woodrow Wilson as the worst U.S. president.

Theodoracopulos is a frequent critic of Israel, and has described himself as pro-Palestinian. His views led Conrad Black to accuse him of antisemitism. Following Black's column, Boris Johnson came to Theodoracopulos' defense, and threatened to quit The Spectator if Theodoracopulos was fired.

In 2018, he wrote an article in The Spectator commemorating D-Day in which he praised the Wehrmacht for their bravery, and asked readers to sympathize with them.

== Personal life ==
Theodoracopulos is a Christian. He has an interest in Asian martial arts, and holds a black belt in karate. He owned a 37.5-metre yacht named Bushido that was put up for sale in 2012.

=== Legal issues ===
In 1984, Theodoracopulos was arrested for the possession of cocaine, after attempting to board a plane at Heathrow Airport, and served three months in HMP Pentonville. He documented his prison experiences in Nothing to Declare: Prison Memoirs (1991) and discussed them in an extended appearance on the British television programme After Dark.

On 5 October 2023, Theodoracopulos received a 12-month suspended sentence for the charge of attempted rape. Theodoracopulos had been accused of attempting to rape Lisa Hilton in 2009, in his chalet in Gstaad, Switzerland. His lawyer indicated that he would appeal the verdict by a Swiss court. He has maintained his innocence, describing Hilton's accusations as "monstrous" and an attempt to destroy his career. In August 2025, Theodoracopulos confirmed that he has appealed the case.

=== Marriages ===
Taki's first marriage, which began and ended in his 20s, was to 20 year old Cristina de Caraman, and soon ended in divorce. In 1981, he married Austrian Princess Alexandra Schoenburg, with whom he has a son and a daughter.

== Bibliography ==
- Theodoracopulos, Taki, The Greek Upheaval: Kings, Demagogues and Bayonets. London: Stacey International, 1976.
- Taki and Jeffrey Bernard, High Life, Low Life, introduction by Richard West, edited by Cosmo Landesman. London: Jay Landseman, 1981. ISBN 0-905150-27-9
- Taki, Princes, Playboys & High-Class Tarts, foreword by Tom Wolfe, illustrations by Blair Drawson. Princeton: Karz-Cohl Publishers, 1984. ISBN 0-943828-61-9
- Taki, High Life, selected by Andrew Cameron, illustrated by Michael Heath. London: Viking, 1989. ISBN 0-670-82956-0
- Taki, Nothing to Declare: Prison Memoirs, London: Viking, 1991. ISBN 0-670-83276-6
- Glass, Charles (ed.), Taki: The Spectator Columns, 2001–2009, London, Quartet, 2010. ISBN 978-0-7043-7192-7
- Taki, The Last Alpha Male. Passage Press, 2025. ISBN 978-1-9594-0353-1
