= Scott McConnell =

American journalist (born 1952)

- Born: 1952 (age 73–74)
- Education: Columbia University (BA, PhD)
- Alma mater: Phillips Exeter Academy
- Occupations: journalist, editor
- Known for: founding editor of The American Conservative
- Relatives: Sterling Hayden (stepfather)

Scott McConnell (born 1952) is an American journalist best known as a founding editor of The American Conservative.

== Early life ==
McConnell was born in 1952. He is the great-grandson of businessman David H. McConnell, the founder of Avon, and is also the stepson of actor Sterling Hayden. He was educated at Phillips Exeter Academy. He earned a bachelor's degree in 1975 and, after working on the 1976 presidential campaign of Jimmy Carter, a Ph.D. in history in 1987, all from Columbia University.

== Career ==
McConnell began writing for publications such as Commentary and National Review. In 1989, McConnell became an editorial writer and later columnist for the New York Post and served as editorial page editor in 1997. He was a columnist for Antiwar.com until 2002. He co-founded The American Conservative with Pat Buchanan and Taki Theodoracopolous in 2002. At the end of 2004, McConnell became the sole editor of TAC.

McConnell is the author of several books. In Leftward Journey: The Education of Vietnamese Students in France, 1919–1939, he argues that French paternalistic attitudes led to the rejection of liberalism by Vietnamese students, whose nationalism subsequently radicalized along Marxism lines.

He was the former boss of Richard Spencer.
