= Steve Sailer =

American political writer (born 1958)

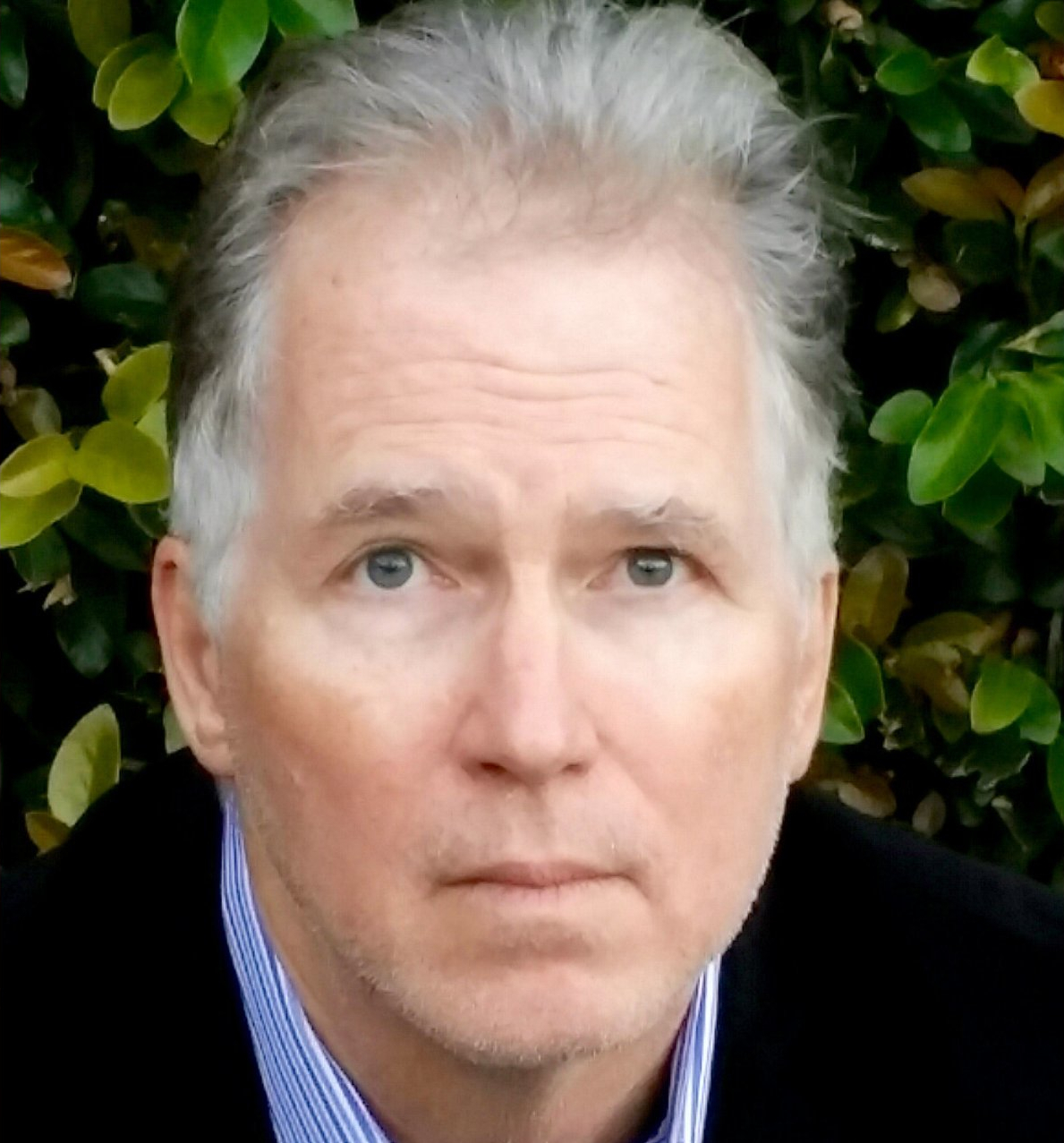
- Sailer in 2021
- Born: December 20, 1958 (age 67); Studio City, Los Angeles, United States
- Education: Rice University (BA); University of California, Los Angeles (MBA)
- Occupations: Columnist, blogger
- Website: www.stevesailer.net

Steven Sailer is an American far-right political writer. He was a weekly columnist for the paleoconservative Taki's Magazine and a daily blogger for the alt-right VDARE and The Unz Review for years. Earlier writing by Sailer appeared in some mainstream outlets, and his writings have been described as prefiguring Trumpism, and have made him a prominent figure in right-wing discussions on immigration, intelligence and culture. Sailer popularized the term "human biodiversity" for a right-wing audience in the 1990s as a euphemism for scientific racism and hereditarianism.

== Early life and education ==
Sailer, born in December 20, 1958, was adopted by a Lockheed engineer and grew up in Studio City, Los Angeles. He majored in economics, history, and management at Rice University (BA, 1980). He earned an MBA from UCLA in 1982 with two concentrations: finance and marketing.

== Writing career ==
He began writing for the conservative magazine National Review in the 1990s, but was let go in 1997. In August 1999, he debated Steve Levitt at the Slate website, calling into question Levitt's hypothesis, which would appear in the 2005 book Freakonomics, that legalized abortion in America reduced crime. He was a reporter for the American news agency United Press International.

Sailer, along with Charles Murray and John McGinnis, was described as an "evolutionary conservative" in a 1999 National Review cover story by John O'Sullivan. Sailer's work has frequently appeared at Taki's Magazine, VDARE, and The Unz Review. He used the phrase "Invade the World, Invite the World" in the 2000s as a criticism of American foreign and immigration policies. Sailer was the founder of an online electronic mailing list called the Human Biodiversity Discussion Group.

Sailer's January 2003 article "Cousin Marriage Conundrum", published in The American Conservative, argued that nation building in Iraq would likely fail because of the high degree of consanguinity among Iraqis due to the common practice of cousin marriage. This article was selected for The Best American Science and Nature Writing 2004, edited by Steven Pinker. In 2008, Sailer published his first book, America's Half-Blood Prince, a critical analysis of Barack Obama's 1995 biography Dreams from My Father that argued Obama was a black nationalist.

In 2023, he published Noticing, an anthology of his writings. The title refers to the term "noticer", which is used by some sections of the online right to refer to people who see social events with a racial hereditarian lens.

== Influence ==
Sailer's writing has been described as a precursor to Trumpism, seeming "to exercise a kind of subliminal influence across much of the right in the 2000s. One could detect his influence even in the places where his controversial writing on race was decidedly unwelcome." After the 2016 election, Michael Barone credited Sailer with having charted in 2001 the electoral path that Donald Trump had successfully followed. Economist Tyler Cowen said on his blog Marginal Revolution that Sailer is likely the "most significant neo-reaction thinker today." His work is popular across the American right.

== Views ==
=== Views on race and ethnicity ===
Sailer does not see race as a social construct. In his view, race is an "extremely extended family that inbreeds to some degree", and races, on average, significantly differ in intelligence and personality. In an article he wrote on Hurricane Katrina, Sailer has described black people as tending "to possess poorer native judgment than members of better educated groups" and thus need stricter moral guidance from society. In the same article, he said in reference to the New Orleans slogan "let the good times roll" that it "is an especially risky message for African-Americans." The article was criticized for being racist by Media Matters for America and the Southern Poverty Law Center, as well as some conservative commentators. Neoconservative columnist John Podhoretz wrote in the National Review Online blog that Sailer's statement was "shockingly racist and paternalistic" as well as "disgusting".

He argued that the major cause for the lack of development of white identity politics was that "more Jews don’t want it to happen than do want it to happen."

Sailer has been described as a white supremacist and white nationalist, including by the Southern Poverty Law Center and the Columbia Journalism Review. Sailer himself denies that he is racist or a white nationalist, and describes himself as a "citizenist".

=== The "Sailer Strategy" ===
The term "Sailer Strategy" has been used for Sailer's proposal that Republican candidates can gain political support in American elections by appealing to working-class whites with heterodox right-wing nationalist and economic populist positions. In order to do this, Sailer suggested that Republicans support economic protectionism, national identity politics, and immigration restrictionism, among other issues. The goal of this is to focusing on increasing Republicans' share of the white electorate, in the belief that minority votes could not be won in significant numbers.

The strategy was similar to that used by Donald Trump in the 2016 presidential election, and has been claimed as one of the reasons Trump was able to win support from rural white voters.

== Bibliography ==
- —— (2008). America's Half-Blood Prince: Barack Obama's "Story of Race and Inheritance". Washington: VDare Foundation. ISBN 978-0-578-00037-4.
- —— (2024). Noticing: An Essential Reader, 1973–2023. Los Angeles: Passage Publishing. ISBN 978-1-959403-02-9.
