= The Unz Review =

Far-right American website

- Home page of the website on October 18, 2025
- Website type: Alt-right, white nationalism
- Available in: English
- Country of origin: United States
- Founder: Ron Unz
- Editor: Ron Unz
- Website: unz.com
- Launched: November 2013; 12 years ago

The Unz Review is an American website and blog founded and edited by Ron Unz, an American far-right activist and Holocaust denier. It is known for its publication of far-right, conspiracy theory, white nationalist, and antisemitic writings.

== History ==
Ron Unz, far-right activist, conspiracy theorist, and Holocaust denier, launched The Unz Review in November 2013. Unz is editor-in-chief and publisher of the website. The Unz Review was launched after Unz was kicked out of The American Conservative for publishing contentious content. The website was created as a collection of Unz's increasingly radical political writings. Unz said that the reason why he created The Unz Review was because mainstream media ignored certain political and racial content, so he created the website as a platform to share "controversial perspectives".

According to The Spectator, the website was not seriously radical in its early years, but was "edgier" than The American Conservative. Later, Unz began inviting nationalists to write for the website, justifying this by saying that he did not share their views, but that they deserved to be heard in public. Unz's writings initially leaned towards paleoconservatism and libertarianism, but later took on an extreme far-right tone, according to Megan Squire, an analyst at the Southern Poverty Law Center. The website hosts writings of various far-right figures, as well as extremist literature, such as the 1976 holocaust denial book The Hoax of the Twentieth Century.

In May 2020, Facebook removed fake accounts tied to The Unz Review. These accounts had spent $114,000 to advertise on Facebook.

== Editorial positions ==
The Unz Review describes itself as a publication presenting an "alternative media selection", and "controversial perspectives largely excluded from the American mainstream media". It has been described as "alternative conservative", far-right, white nationalist, and a publisher of antisemitism and Holocaust denial. The Associated Press describes the outlet as "a hodgepodge of views from corners of both the left and right". According to the Anti-Defamation League (ADL), the website is an "outlet for certain writers to attack Israel and Jews". Debunk.org has written that The Unz Review articles promote a pro-Russian and anti-Ukraine narrative based on conspiracy theories about COVID-19. Tablet said that The Unz Review was frequently quoted by David Duke.

=== Writers ===
The Unz Review hosts blogs of far-right writers Steve Sailer and Anatoly Karlin. The Review of General Psychology describes Sailer as "a political writer who uses the language of IQ and genetics to further a White nationalist political agenda" and Karlin as a promoter of "antisemitic conspiracy theories and associates with alt-right political activist Richard Spencer". In October, 2021, Karlin posted on his personal blog that he would no longer be a regular contributor to The Unz Review, while noting his "respect and appreciation" for Ron Unz.

In June 2023, an article in The Guardian observed that "[a]mong those whose writings Unz republishes are Andrew Anglin, founder of the neo-Nazi Daily Stormer website ... and Eric Striker (real name Joseph Jordan), a founder of the neo-Nazi National Justice Party". Writer Stephen Sniegoski said in The Unz Review in June 2016 that the New Deal of United States president Franklin D. Roosevelt had a greater "connection to fascism than anything Donald Trump has said".

== Controversies ==
In September 2017, former CIA operative Valerie Plame apologized after receiving attention for sharing Philip Giraldi's antisemitic The Unz Review article "America's Jews Are Driving America's Wars" on her Twitter account. The article's depictions of Jews controlling the media and politics echoed long-running tropes blaming them for a variety of social and economic ills.

In November 2019, Eric Rasmusen, professor at Indiana University, posted a quote on Twitter from The Unz Review article titled "Are Women Destroying Academia? Probably", which the university's Executive Vice President described as "racist, sexist, and homophobic". The quote said: "geniuses are overwhelmingly male because they combine outlier IQ with moderately low Agreeableness and Moderately low Conscientiousness". The post led to Rasmusen receiving widespread condemnation and demands for the university to fire him. Despite this, the university said it would not fire him because doing so would violate the First Amendment.

In May 2021, Luisa Neubauer accused Hans-Georg Maaßen, the former president of the Federal Office for the Protection of the Constitution (Germany's intelligence agency), of antisemitism for sharing links to The Unz Review and using terms like "globalists" on his Twitter account.
