= A Country of Vast Designs =

2009 history book by Robert W. Merry

A Country of Vast Designs: James K. Polk, the Mexican War and the Conquest of the American Continent
- Author: Robert W. Merry
- Audio read by: Michael Prichard
- Language: English
- Subject: Mexican American War, James K. Polk, Manifest Destiny, Territorial evolution of the United States
- Genre: Non-fiction, history
- Publisher: Simon & Schuster
- Publication date: 2009
- Pages: 608
- ISBN: 978-0743297448
- Website: Simon & Schuster page

A Country of Vast Designs: James K. Polk, the Mexican War and the Conquest of the American Continent is a book by Robert W. Merry published in 2009 by Simon & Schuster. The work focuses on the background and political history of the south westward expansion of the United States, the Presidency of James K. Polk, and the Mexican American War.

== Reviews ==
- Belohlavek, John M. (2011). "Reviewed work: A Country of Vast Designs: James K. Polk, the Mexican War, and the Conquest of the American Continent, Robert W. Merry". The Register of the Kentucky Historical Society. 109 (2): 234–236. doi:10.1353/khs.2011.0074. JSTOR 23387476. S2CID 162308482.
- Huntington, T., "A Country Of Vast Designs: James K. Polk, The Mexican War And The Conquest Of The American Continent, By Robert W. Merry", American Heritage
- McGowan, Brian M. (2011). "Reviewed work: A Country of Vast Designs: James K. Polk, the Mexican War and the Conquest of the American Continent, Robert W. Merry". The Historian. 73 (3): 570–571. doi:10.1111/j.1540-6563.2011.00301_17.x. JSTOR 24455320. S2CID 143217254.
- Mead, Walter Russell (2010). "Reviewed work: A Country of Vast Designs: James K. Polk, the Mexican War, and the Conquest of the American Continent, ROBERT W. MERRY". Foreign Affairs. 89 (3): 141. JSTOR 25680940.
- Morrison, M. (2010). "A Country of Vast Designs: James K. Polk, the Mexican War and the Conquest of the American Continent". Louisiana State University. 12.
- Silbey, Joel H. (2012). "Reviewed work: A Country of Vast Designs: James K. Polk, the Mexican War and the Conquest of the American Continent, Robert W. Merry". Presidential Studies Quarterly. 42 (2): 412–414. doi:10.1111/j.1741-5705.2012.03977.x. JSTOR 41427401.
- Wilentz, S. (20 November 2009), "Into the West", New York Times

== Publication history ==
- 2009 Hardback and ebook, Simon & Schuster.
- 2009 audiobook, Tantor Audio.
- 2010 Paperback, Simon & Schuster.

== About the author ==
Robert W. Merry is the author of several books and an experienced journalist. He has held senior positions at multiple media organizations.

== Similar or related works ==
- President McKinley: Architect of the American Century by Robert W. Merry.
- A Wicked War: Polk, Clay, Lincoln and the 1846 U.S. Invasion of Mexico by Amy S. Greenberg.
- Trailing Clouds of Glory: Zachary Taylor's Mexican War Campaign and His Emerging Civil War Leaders by Felice Flanery Lewis.

== See also ==
- Manifest Destiny
- Mexican American War
- James K. Polk
