= VDARE =

American alt-right white nationalist website

- Website type: Far-right politics
- Owner: VDARE Foundation
- Founder: Peter Brimelow
- Website: vdare.com
- Launched: 1999; 27 years ago
- Current status: Operations suspended since July 26, 2024; 2 years ago

VDARE is an American far-right website that promotes opposition to immigration to the United States. It is associated with white supremacy, white nationalism, and the alt-right. Anti-Immigration in the United States: A Historical Encyclopedia describes VDARE as "one of the most prolific anti-immigration media outlets in the United States" and states that it was "broadly concerned with race issues in the United States". Established in 1999, the website's editor was Peter Brimelow, who once stated that "whites built American culture" and that "it is at risk from non-whites who would seek to change it".

The Southern Poverty Law Center describes VDARE as "an anti-immigration hate website" that "regularly publishes articles by prominent white nationalists, race scientists, and anti-Semites", including Steve Sailer, Jared Taylor, J. Philippe Rushton, Samuel T. Francis, John Derbyshire and Pat Buchanan. Brimelow acknowledged that VDARE published writings by white nationalists but said that VDARE was not a "white nationalist Web site".

In July 2024, it was announced that VDARE would be suspending operations in response to legal and technical issues. Brimelow also stepped down as president of the VDARE Foundation.

== History ==
Peter Brimelow, who edits VDARE, is a former editor at National Review and Fortune. The English-born Brimelow founded the website in 1999 under the auspices of the Center for American Unity, a Virginia-based organization that he also founded in 1999. VDARE was founded as an outgrowth of Brimelow's anti-immigration activism and the publication of his book Alien Nation: Common Sense About America's Immigration Disaster. The website says it is concerned with the "racial and culture identity of America" and "honest consideration of race and ethnicity, the foundations of human grouping, that human differences can be explained and their social consequences understood, whether those differences are philosophical, cultural or biological."

Brimelow was president of the center, which funded VDARE.com until 2007, when the center announced an intent to focus on litigation. The VDARE Foundation, a 501(c)(3) organization, was formed by Brimelow to take the place of the center as the website's sponsor. Brimelow's wife, Lydia Brimelow, is VDARE's advancement officer.

The name VDARE and the site's logo, the head of a white doe, refer to Virginia Dare, the first child born to English settlers in the New World in the late 16th century. Dare disappeared along with every other member of the Roanoke Colony. Anti-Immigration in the United States: A Historical Encyclopedia explains that "For Brimelow, Anglo-Saxon Americans and their culture are in danger of disappearing like Virginia Dare; he writes that he considered adding a fictional vignette at the end of his book Alien Nation (1995), in which the last white family flees Los Angeles, which had been overrun by the crime and pollution caused by its non-white residents."

Brimelow has written on the site that United States immigration policy constitutes "Adolf Hitler's posthumous revenge on America". In a radio interview with Alan Colmes, he said he wished to return to the US immigration policies before 1965, when restrictions to non-whites were lifted, as "the US is a white nation."

=== New York Attorney General investigation ===
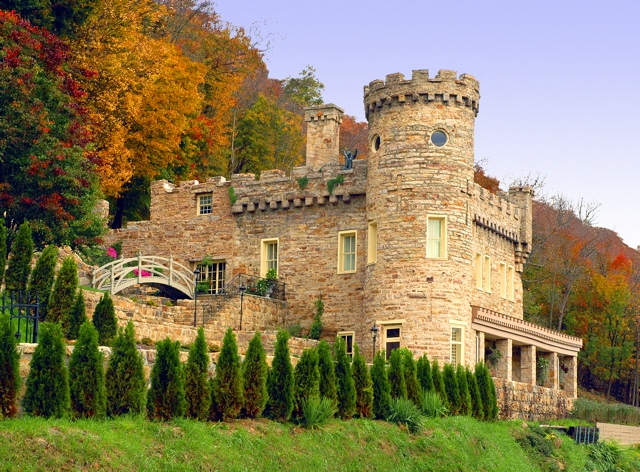
The Samuel Taylor Suit Cottage, which was purchased by the VDARE Foundation in 2020

In February 2020, the VDARE Foundation purchased the Samuel Taylor Suit Cottage (also known as the Berkeley Castle or Berkeley Springs Castle), a Medieval-style castle located on a hill above Berkeley Springs, in the Eastern Panhandle of West Virginia, for $1.4 million. New York Attorney General (NYAG) Letitia James alleged that VDARE had violated New York law by misusing non-profit resources while residing on the castle grounds since March 2020. The VDARE Foundation is registered in New York and is therefore subject to New York regulation.

In March 2024, a New York state judge found the VDARE Foundation in civil contempt for failing to turn over evidence related to the investigation. The organization was required to pay a $250-per-day fine until it complied with a subpoena issued by the NYAG in 2022. In July, it was announced that VDARE would be suspending operations, with Brimelow resigning as president of the VDARE Foundation. A spokesperson for the attorney general's office said that the website's closure would not affect their investigation.

In September 2025, New York sued the VDARE foundation and its owners, alleging the non-profit was operated for the benefit of its owners Peter and Lydia Brimelow. Saying her office would "shut down this fraudulent organization", the state attorney general alleged, "The Brimelows used VDARE like their personal piggy bank, draining millions in charitable assets to enrich themselves."

== Hate speech and white nationalism ==
=== Designation as a hate website ===
The Southern Poverty Law Center (SPLC), which tracks extremist groups in the United States, wrote that VDARE was "once a relatively mainstream anti-immigration page" but had become "a meeting place for many on the radical right" by 2003. The SPLC describes VDARE as "an anti-immigration hate website" which "regularly publishes articles by prominent white nationalists, race scientists and anti-Semites". The SPLC cited examples such as a column concerning immigration from Mexico that warned of a "Mexican invasion" where "high teenage birthrates, poverty, ignorance and disease will be what remains", and an essay complaining how the U.S. government encourages "the garbage of Africa" to come to the United States.

The SPLC has described VDARE's contributor list as "a Rolodex of the most prominent pseudo-intellectual racists and anti-Semites. They include people such as Jared Taylor and Kevin MacDonald. Taylor (who Brimelow acknowledges is a "white nationalist") once wrote that black people are incapable of sustaining any kind of civilization, while MacDonald is a retired professor who wrote a trilogy claiming that Jews are genetically driven to undermine the Christian societies they live in. Another former contributor, Sam Francis, was the editor of a newspaper published by the Council of Conservative Citizens, a white supremacist group. Francis died in 2005.

The Anti-Defamation League (ADL) similarly concluded that "VDARE posts, promotes, and archives the work of racists, anti-immigrant figures, and anti-Semites".

=== Attempted domain name delisting ===
In June 2020, the domain registrar Network Solutions announced plans to terminate the account for VDARE. An attorney for Network Solutions cited a policy prohibiting customers using its domains from "display[ing] bigotry, racism, discrimination, or hatred in any manner whatsoever", and stated that VDARE had until June 26 to transfer its domain name to a different registrar before it would be deleted. An update to its WHOIS data was made on June 26, 2020. As of 2023, the domain exists under a different registrar.

=== Social media presence and bans ===
In August 2019, VDARE's YouTube channel was banned. The ban was later reversed. The channel was permanently banned in August 2020 for violating YouTube's policies against hate speech.

In November 2019, The Guardian identified VDARE as one of several white nationalist websites which had remained active on Facebook, contrary to Facebook's stated intention to ban such material. In May 2020, VDARE and the similar website The Unz Review were banned by Facebook. According to Facebook, the sites formed a network of "coordinated inauthentic behavior" intended to influence the 2020 election via fake accounts.

As of October 2023, VDARE operated a verified Twitter account.

=== White nationalist writings ===
VDARE is regarded as a white nationalist website. David Weigel wrote in 2010 that the site "is best known for publishing work by white nationalists while maintaining that it is not a white nationalist site".

Brimelow "denies that the organization itself is white nationalist, but he admits that VDARE.com provides a forum for a variety of viewpoints, including white nationalism". Of individuals like Taylor, Brimelow has written they "aim to defend the interests of American whites. They are not white supremacists. They do not advocate violence. They are rational and civil." As immigration from the developing world increases, he believes "this type of interest-group 'white nationalism' will inexorably increase." Brimelow has participated on panels multiple times with Taylor and Richard Spencer on the aims of the alt-right.

Brimelow sued the New York Times in 2020, alleging libel over several articles describing him as a white nationalist and the VDARE web site as "animated by race hatred." The suit was dismissed.
