= The American Conservative =

American Ideas Institute magazine

- October 2016 issue
- Executive Director: Curt Mills
- Categories: Editorial magazine
- Frequency: Once every two months
- Circulation: 5,000
- Publisher: The American Ideas Institute
- Founder: Pat Buchanan; Scott McConnell; Taki Theodoracopulos
- First issue: October 7, 2002; 23 years ago
- Country: United States
- Based in: Washington, D.C.
- Language: English
- Website: theamericanconservative.com
- ISSN: 1540-966X

The American Conservative (TAC) is a bimonthly magazine published by the American Ideas Institute. The magazine was founded in 2002 by Pat Buchanan, Scott McConnell and Taki Theodoracopulos to advance an anti-neoconservative perspective. It has been noted as the only conservative publication in the early 2000s to oppose the Iraq War, publishing a string of articles Ralph Nader described as "the most devastating critiques of the neocons' lust for unlawful wars" of the era. It was later credited with putting JD Vance's Hillbilly Elegy "on the map" in a 2016 interview with Vance.

According to the publication, it exists to promote a form of conservatism that opposes unchecked power in government and business, supports "vibrant markets and free people", and embraces "realism and restraint" in foreign policy.

== History ==
The American Conservative was founded by Pat Buchanan, Scott McConnell and Taki Theodoracopulos in October 2002. The magazine took a paleoconservative character, aiming to counter the neoconservative positions of the National Review and The Weekly Standard. It was critical of the Bush administration and in particular of its invasion of Iraq. According to the publication, its purpose is to promote a conservatism that opposes unchecked power in government and business, and advocate for the nuclear family, free markets, and realism and restraint in foreign affairs based on America's national interests.

In the first issue, dated 7 October 2002, the editorial by Buchanan and Taki stated that the new publication aimed "to ignite the conversations that conservatives ought to have engaged in since the end of the Cold War, but didn't." It continued that much of what then passed for conservatism was "wedded to a kind of radicalism – fantasies of global hegemony, the hubristic notion of America as a universal nation for all the world's peoples, a hyperglobal economy." In the same issue, an article by Buchanan challenged the Iraq War, asking "What comes after all the celebratory gunfire when wicked Saddam is dead?" and the magazine has been credited as the only conservative publication to oppose the war.

Until early 2005, Buchanan and Taki served as the magazine's editors, with McConnell as executive editor, while Taki was its publisher. Kara Hopkins was the next executive editor. In its early years, the magazine called for an amendment to the US Constitution to ban same-sex marriage. Before the 2006 midterm elections, The American Conservative urged its readers to vote for Democrats: "It should surprise few readers that we think a vote that is seen—in America and the world at large—as a decisive 'No' vote on the Bush presidency is the best outcome". Buchanan and Taki retired as editors, and Taki as publisher, in 2005, although Buchanan continued to write for it. Ron Unz was the publisher in 2007.

In 2010, Daniel McCarthy succeeded Hopkins as editor. In September 2011, the magazine introduced an editorial redesign of its print publication and in May 2012 a redesign of its website. In October 2014, Benjamin Schwarz, the former national and literary editor of The Atlantic, was named national editor of the magazine. In November 2016, Robert W. Merry succeeded McCarthy as editor, with Lewis McCrary and Kelley Beaucar Vlahos as Executive Editors. After Merry's retirement in July 2018, W. James Antle III was named editor. In April 2020, Johnny Burtka, executive director and acting editor of The American Conservative, said that the publication's ambition is to "become The Atlantic of the right" and said its online page views had "grown significantly" under the Trump administration. The American Conservative is a member of the advisory board of Project 2025.

In 2025, The American Conservative's executive director Curt Mills stated the magazine would decline to agree to the U.S. Department of Defense's reporting rules, commenting that "we are not in the stenography business". According to Mills, the decision followed an invitation by the department to be credentialed for Pentagon press access.

=== Publication ===
Originally published semi-monthly, it was reduced to a monthly publication in August 2009 and, in 2013, a bimonthly publication.

== Impact ==
Largely reviled by many American conservatives following its founding due to its pacifist and iconoclastic positions, the magazine spent its early history, according to The Washington Post, as "an unheeded voice in the face of indifferent or hostile elite opinion". In subsequent years, the publication evolved into what Matthew Continetti described as a "durable platform for the anti-war right" and, in 2023, Vanity Fair reported that over "the last seven years, the Republican Party has grown to embody just about everything The American Conservative has ever wanted".

=== Influence ===
In July 2016, JD Vance gave an interview to The American Conservative about his book Hillbilly Elegy, which was later credited by the New York Times' Jennifer Senior with launching the volume's success and putting it "on the map".

=== Reception ===
In 2004, Peter Carlson wrote in The Washington Post that for scathing attacks on Bush and the invasion of Iraq, The American Conservative might have the edge over The Nation, Mother Jones, and The Progressive. In 2009, Reihan Salam, National Review editor, wrote that the publication had "gained a devoted following as a sharp critic of the conservative mainstream".

In 2012, David Brooks, columnist at The New York Times, called The American Conservative "one of the more dynamic spots on the political Web" and said its "writers like Rod Dreher and Daniel Larison tend to be suspicious of bigness: big corporations, big government, a big military, concentrated power and concentrated wealth." In 2014, Ralph Nader credited The American Conservative with demonstrating "the possibility of Left-Right fusion" and attributed to it "the most devastating critiques of the neocons' lust for unlawful wars". According to Nader, "The Nation magazine could easily carry most of its articles without skipping a paragraph".

== Contributors ==
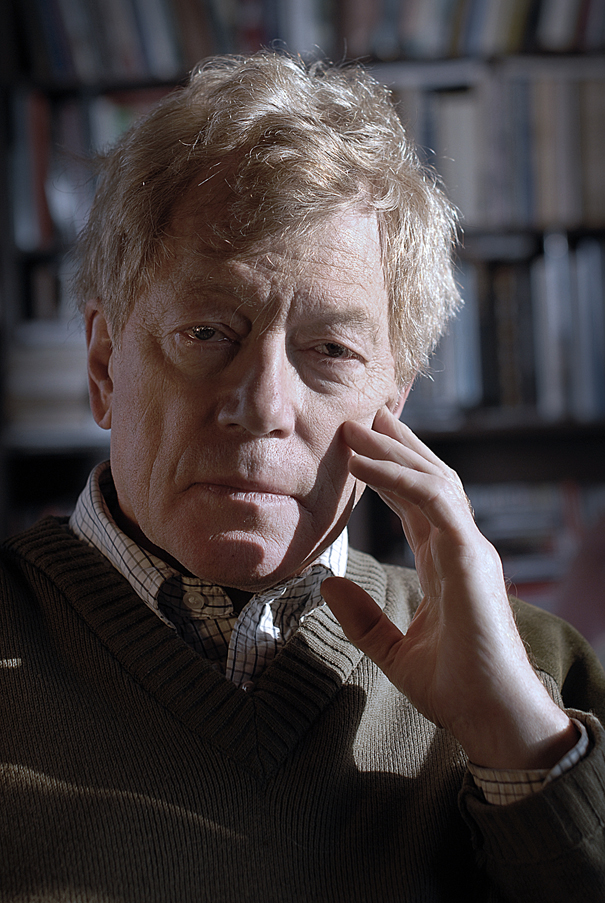
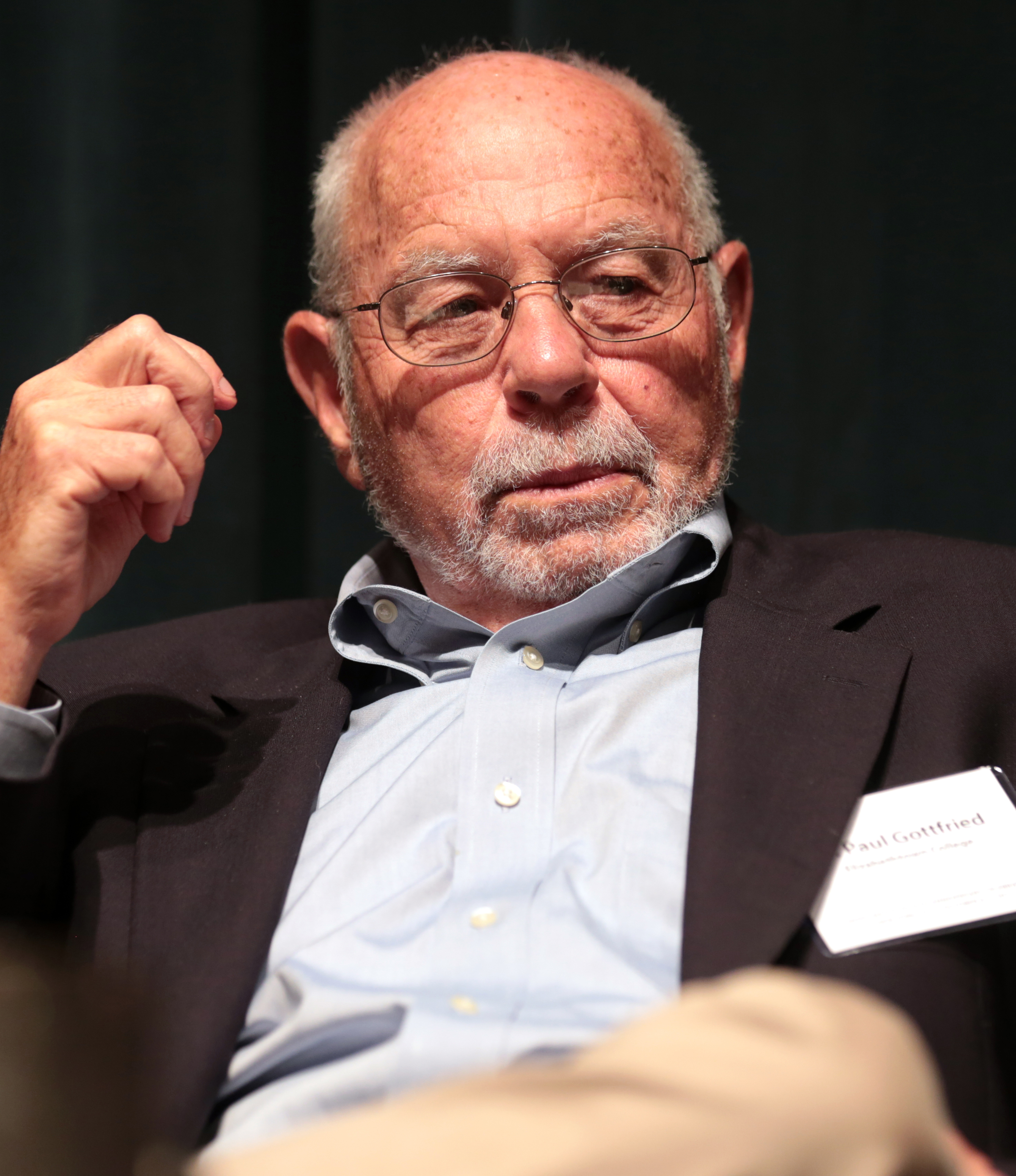
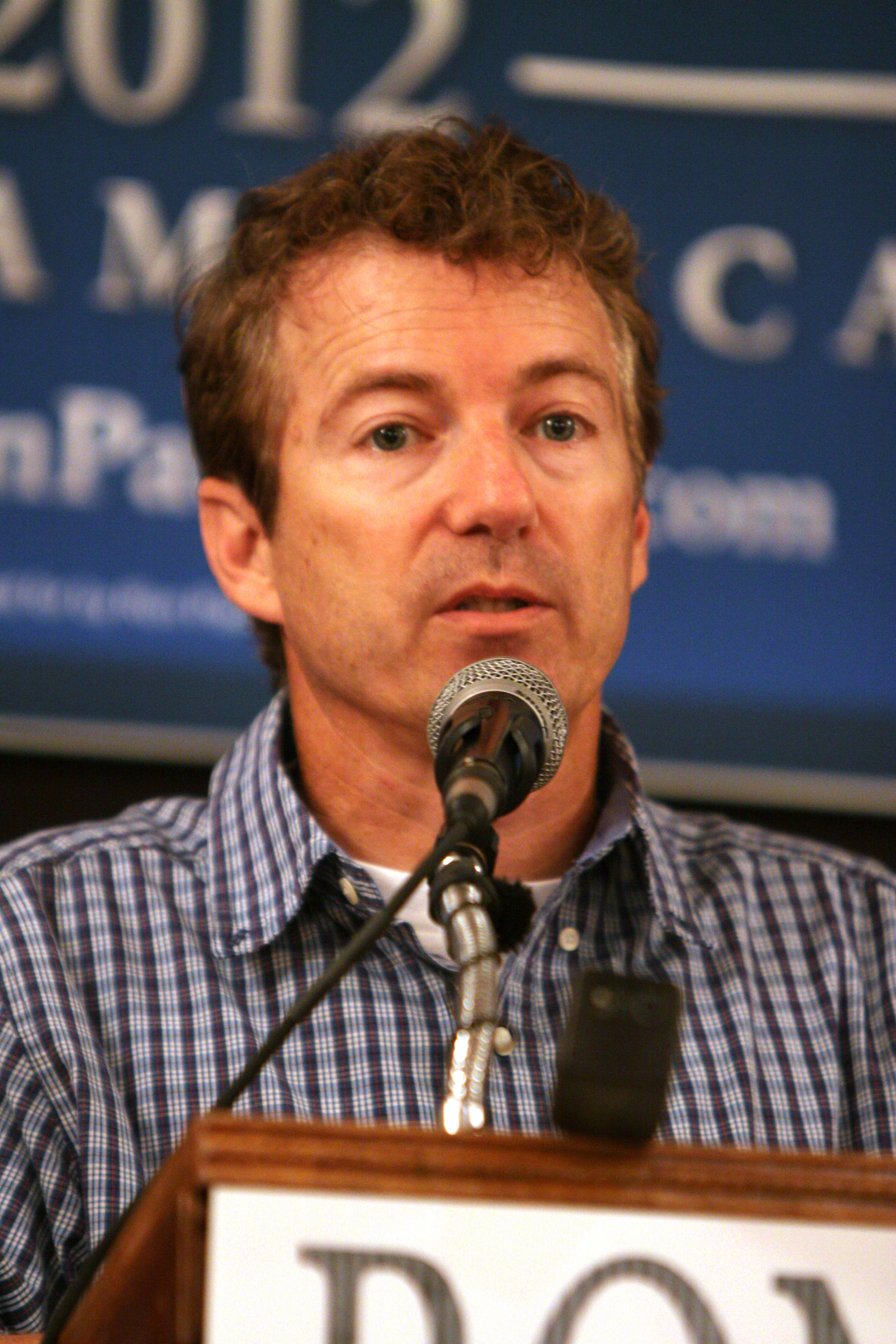
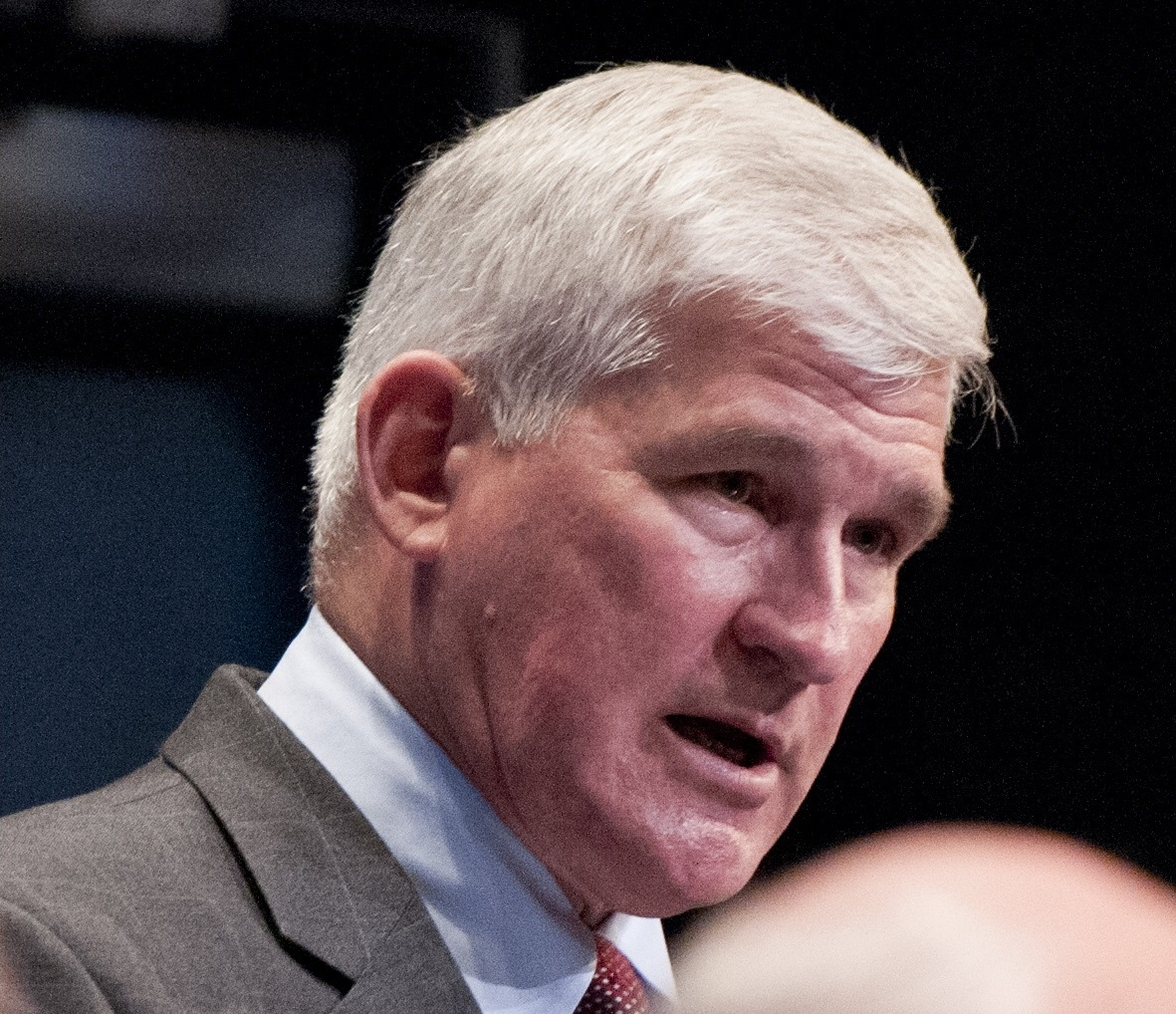
Contributors to The American Conservative have included Sir Roger Scruton, Paul Gottfried, Andrew Bacevich, and Rand Paul (pictured, clockwise from top left).

Contributors to The American Conservative have included Helen Andrews, Andrew Bacevich, Doug Bandow, Pat Buchanan, Andrew Cockburn, Rod Dreher, Paul Gottfried, Leon Hadar, James Kurth, Christopher Layne, Michael Lind, William S. Lind, Douglas Macgregor, Eric Margolis, Scott McConnell, Robert W. Merry, Rand Paul, Mark Perry, Scott Ritter, Steve Sailer, Paul W. Schroeder, Benjamin Schwarz, Roger Scruton, Taki Theodoracopulos, Ron Unz, JD Vance and Tom Woods.

== See also ==
- Classical liberalism
- Communitarianism
- Conservatism in the United States
- Libertarianism
- List of United States magazines
- Natural Law
- Neoconservatism
- Realism (international relations)
- Religion in the United States
- Tory
- Traditionalist conservatism
