= Peter Cvjetanovic =

American former white supremacist (born 1996)

Peter Cytanovic
- Born: 1996 (age 29–30); Reno, Nevada, U.S.
- Other name: Peter Cvjetanovic
- Education: University of Nevada, Reno; London School of Economics; Catholic University of America
- Employer(s): University of Nevada, Reno (2017); Nevada National Guard (2019-2021)
- Organization: Former Identity Evropa
- Known for: White nationalism, Unite the Right rally protesting
- Website: personal website

Peter Cvjetanovic (also known as Peter Cytanovic; born 1996) is a former American white supremacist known for being photographed while demonstrating with other white nationalists including Neo-Nazis, Proud Boys and Ku Klux Klan members on the Grounds of University of Virginia at the Unite the Right rally in 2017.

Cvjetanovic worked as a driver for the University of Nevada, Reno, where he was a student in 2017, and was a soldier in the Nevada National Guard from 2019 to 2021. He was dismissed from the National Guard in 2021 after a background check for a security clearance revealed his history of extremism.

During an interview in 2019, Cvjetanovic said that he no longer considered himself a white nationalist, and had begun volunteering with a counter-extremism organization.

== Early life ==
Cvjetanovic was born in Reno, Nevada in 1996. His father worked at a casino; his mother received a brain cancer diagnosis during her pregnancy with him and the cost of her treatment left the family cash strapped. He grew up in a household that he described as impoverished and Catholic.

Cvjetanovic graduated from North Valleys High School in Reno, in 2014. He studied history and political science at the University of Nevada, Reno earning a bachelor's degree in 2018.

== Activism and views ==
In 2017, Cvjetanovic was a white nationalist and a member of Identity Evropa, a group that the Southern Poverty Law Center has labeled as a hate group. A photograph of Cvjetanovic and Teddy Joseph Von Nukem holding tiki torches at the Unite the Right rally became the image most commonly used to represent the 2017 right-wing protest in Charlottesville, Virginia. A Boston Globe opinion piece by media studies professor Aniko Bodroghkozy described Cvjetanovic as sporting a "Hitler Youth haircut" in the photograph.

Cvjetanovic resigned as a driver for the University of Nevada, Reno in 2017, while continuing his studies there. Cvjetanovic worked for the campus escort service, PackRides, which provides safe after-hours transportation for students between 5 and 10 pm, and provides weekend transportation to retail shops. Earlier, the university declined to terminate his employment, despite public pressure to do so, citing Cvjetanovic's right to freedom of expression. In a 2017 interview, Cvjetanovic discussed his decision to resign, citing that students might not "appreciate" him as their chauffeur.

During a 2017 interview on local television about his role in the rally, Cvjetanovic denied being racist, but also spoke of "the slow replacement of white heritage in the United States" and described Confederate general Robert E. Lee as someone that he "wanted to honour [for] what he stood for during his time." Cvjetanovic described the far-left and Antifa as "just as dangerous, if not more dangerous than the right wing could ever be."

By 2019 Cvjetanovic, who reported receiving five credible death threats after the photograph went viral on social media, had left the United States and was living in London where he was studying for a master's degree in political theory at the London School of Economics and volunteering for Groundswell, a counter-extremism organisation. In an interview with the university's student newspaper that year he said he had never been a neo-Nazi, and did not understand what the term white nationalist meant when he described himself as one.

He is one of eight people featured in Charlotte McDonald-Gibson's 2022 book Far Out: Encounters with Extremists.

Back in the US, after being indicted by a grand jury in Albemarle County, Virginia, Cvjetanovic was arrested in Washoe County, Nevada in July 2023 and was held without bail in the Washoe County jail on a felony fugitive warrant from Charlottesville awaiting extradition to Virginia. The warrant for his arrest was later withdrawn by authorities in Virginia and he was released. During an interview for the Pop Culture Crisis podcast he stated that he had "been charged with intimidation for Charlottesville."

== Career ==
Cvjetanovic enlisted in the Nevada National Guard in 2019, as Specialist but was discharged in 2021, after background checks highlighted his extremism. Since 2019, he has struggled to find employment due to his infamy.
