= Teddy Joseph Von Nukem =

American white nationalist (1987–2023)

- Born: Ted Landrum; November 23, 1987; Phoenix, Arizona, U.S.
- Died: January 30, 2023 (aged 35); Hartshorn, Missouri, U.S.
- Cause of death: Suicide by gunshot
- Known for: White nationalism
- Children: 5

Teddy Joseph Von Nukem (born Ted Landrum, November 23, 1987 – January 30, 2023) was an American white nationalist and far-right activist noted for his role at the 2017 Unite the Right rally in Charlottesville, Virginia.

In March 2021, Von Nukem admitted to attempted drug smuggling after being arrested at the Mexico–United States border. He failed to show up for a January 30, 2023, court appearance in Arizona, and died from a self-inflicted gunshot injury the same day.

== Early life ==
Nukem was born Ted Landrum on November 23, 1987, in Phoenix, Arizona. He was of German heritage and attended middle school in Lebanon, Missouri. One of his former classmates remembered him as a "smart 'token goth kid' and 'highly intelligent' history buff with an unsettling interest in Nazi Germany".

== Adult life ==
Von Nukem was a far-right extremist and a white nationalist who changed his name to that of video-game character Duke Nukem in 2012. A photograph of him holding a tiki torch at the Unite the Right rally became the image that was most commonly used to represent the 2017 right-wing protest in Charlottesville, Virginia. In the photograph he stands next to a screaming man who was later identified as University of Nevada student Peter Cvjetanovic. Journalist Molly Conger identified Von Nukem as part of a mob that assaulted DeAndre Harris, a Black counter-protester, at the Charlottesville event.

Nukem owned a sales training company, AnCap Incorporated (a portmanteau of anarcho-capitalism), and aspired to be a Member of Congress.

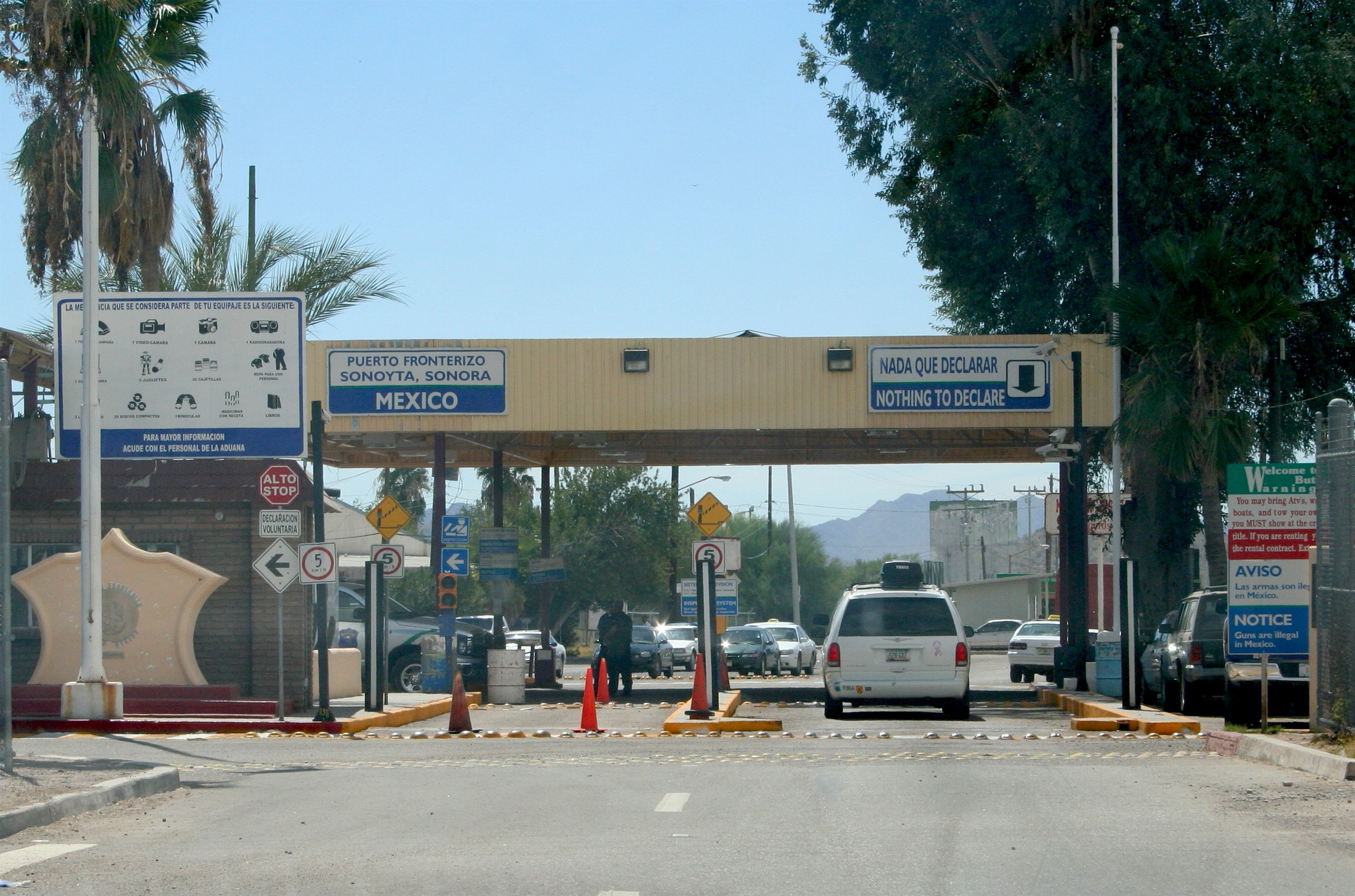
Lukeville Port of Entry

Nukem was arrested near the Mexico–United States border at Lukeville Port of Entry in March 2021; U.S. Immigration and Customs Enforcement agents said he had 14 packages containing 33 pounds of fentanyl in his vehicle. Von Nukem admitted attempting to smuggle drugs, but denied knowledge that the product was fentanyl.

He failed to attend a scheduled Arizona District Court appearance on January 30, 2023, prompting judge Rosemary Márquez to issue an arrest warrant. He was facing federal charges. Within one hour, his wife telephoned the court to inform them of an emergency at the Von Nukem family home after finding his body in the snow behind a hay shed. The case was dismissed on February 10, 2023.

Von Nukem was married with four daughters and a son, and resided in Hartshorn, Missouri. He was a supporter of libertarianism and believed that "white people are disadvantaged in the arena of identity politics."

== Death ==
Von Nukem killed himself at his home in Missouri on January 30, 2023. His death occurred on the same day he was due to stand trial for drug-related criminal charges. He died of a self-inflicted gunshot wound from a handgun. He was aged 35 at the time of his death.

Marie Lasater, the Texas County coroner, confirmed his death was suicide.
