= MACC =

MACC may refer to:

- M.A.C.C., a rock band consisting of Mike McCready, Jeff Ament, Chris Cornell, and Matt Cameron
- Master of Accountancy, a graduate professional degree designed to prepare students for professional accounting, such as the Certified Public Accountant
- Malaysian Anti-Corruption Commission, a government agency in Malaysia that investigates corruption in the public and private sectors
- Metropolitan Anarchist Coordinating Council, an anarchist group based in New York City
- Metro Atlanta Chamber of Commerce, the chamber of commerce for metro Atlanta, US
- Memorial Athletic and Convocation Center, a sports arena at Kent State University in Kent, Ohio, US
- Mississippian Art and Ceremonial Complex, a proposed renaming of the Southeastern Ceremonial Complex
- Moberly Area Community College, a community college based in Moberly, Missouri, US
- MACC (Multi Age Cluster Class), a gifted student program in Metro-Vancouver
- Marginal Abatement Cost Curve, a method of data visualisation showing costs and the scale of emissions reductions
