= New York Light Foot Militia =

Paramilitary organization based in the United States

- Leader: George Curbelo
- Dates active: 2015–Present
- Active regions: New York. United States

The New York Light Foot Militia (NYLFM) is a militia movement organization founded by George Curbelo in 2015 in the U.S. state of New York.

== Activities ==
The group's leader, George Curbelo, lives in Delaware County, New York, in the Catskill Mountains. He has said he is not a military veteran but operates a karate-based martial arts school. In 2017, he said his group numbered about 250 members who train monthly at firearms, reconnaissance, and navigation. Curbeo says the group does not "support white supremacy" and says that the group includes non-whites and non-Christians; Curbeo identifies as a “white Hispanic” of Cuban and Puerto Rican heritage.

In June 2017, members of the group were present at an ACT for America-sponsored "March against Sharia" protest in front of the downtown Federal Building in Syracuse, New York. The event was met by a larger group of counter-protesters. The Light Foot Militia group told reporters that "they did not support either side, but were there to make sure all sides were able to excise [sic] their First Amendment rights."

In August 2017, members of the NYLFM, along with militia-movement adherents from several other states, were present during the far-right Unite the Right rally in Charlottesville, Virginia. Group members carried rifles at the event. Although the groups were initially invited by the white nationalist organizers of rally, the militia groups said that they had come "in a neutral stance." Curbelo, the NYLFM's "commanding officer," criticized the Charlottesville Police Department for failing to separate opposing sides during the rally. Mother Jones magazine reported that "a group of assault-rifle-toting militia members from New York State, wearing body armor and desert camo, played a more active role in breaking up fights" than police did.

In October 2017, the New York Light Foot Militia was named as one of several defendants in a lawsuit filed by the Georgetown University Law Center's Institute for Constitutional Advocacy and Protection on behalf of the City of Charlottesville and several Charlottesville businesses and neighborhood associations. The suit alleges "that the presence of private armies significantly heightens the possibility of violence; that the rally organizers solicited private militias to attend the rally, held group-wide planning calls and circulated an instructional document called General Orders." The militia groups said they did not condone violence and instead intended to uphold the right to assemble, but that Charlottesville was "so overwhelming that the only thing we could do was pick people up off the floor" and act as "a neutral peacekeeping force". The NYLFM condemned the white supremacist presence at Charlottesville, and committed in a consent decree not to return.

In September 2017, about two dozen members of the NYLFM, along with about 200 other militia movement members were present at the Mother of All Rallies, held in support of President Donald Trump on the National Mall. The group did not carry guns at this event because they are not permitted on the National Mall. During the event the group broke up "verbal skirmishes" between attendees and counter-demonstrators, and formed a "protective perimeter around police officers."

In May 2018, NYLFM took part in a national meeting of the patriot movement umbrella organization National Constitutional Citizens of Patriotic Americans (NCCPA). Members were due to participate in a Virginia Civilians Defense League gun rights Lobby Day in Richmond, Virginia in January 2020.
