= Unite the Right rally =

2017 white supremacist rally in Charlottesville, Virginia

- Part of Fascism in the United States and American militias movement
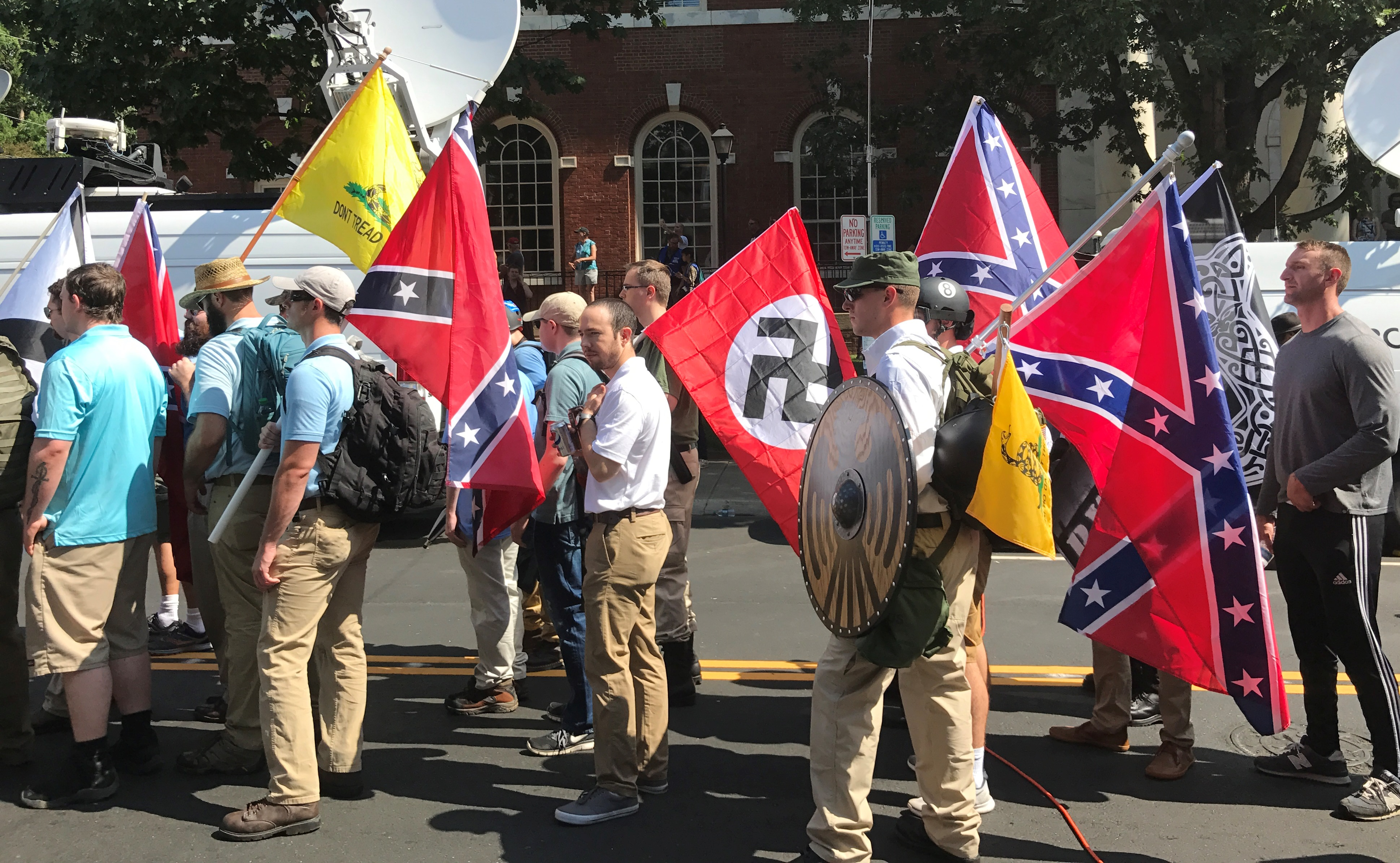
- Rally participants preparing to enter Emancipation Park in Charlottesville, Virginia, on August 12, 2017, carrying Neo-Confederate flags, Confederate battle flags, Gadsden flags, a Nazi flag, and a flag depicting Mjölnir
- Date: August 11–12, 2017
- Location: Charlottesville, Virginia, U.S.
- Goals: Promotion of white supremacist and white nationalist ideologies; Protesting against the Charlottesville City Council's decision to order the removal of Confederate monuments and memorials from local public spaces

Parties
Counter-protesters: National Council of Churches; Black Lives Matter; Anti-Racist Action; Democratic Socialists of America; Workers World Party; Revolutionary Communist Party, USA; Refuse Fascism; Redneck Revolt; Industrial Workers of the World; Metropolitan Anarchist Coordinating Council; Showing Up for Racial Justice; Unaffiliated counter-protesters	Protesters: Nationalist Front; League of the South; Identity Dixie; Traditionalist Worker Party; Vanguard America; National Socialist Movement; Ku Klux Klan (Loyal White Knights of the Ku Klux Klan and Confederate White Knights of the Ku Klux Klan); The Daily Stormer; The Right Stuff; Fraternal Order of Alt-Knights; Identity Evropa; Rise Above Movement; American Guard; Detroit Right Wings; True Cascadia; Alt-Right Montreal; Hammer Brothers; Anti-Communist Action; Atomwaffen Division; American militia movement: Pennsylvania Light Foot Militia; New York Light Foot Militia; Virginia Minutemen Militia; 3 Percenters	Government of Virginia: Virginia State Police

Lead figures
Decentralized	Richard B. Spencer; Jason Kessler	Terry McAuliffe

Casualties and losses
1 killed, 35 injured in car ramming	14+ injured in other clashes	2 state troopers died in an accidental helicopter crash

Casualties
- Arrested: 11

The Unite the Right rally was a white supremacist rally that took place in Charlottesville, Virginia, from August 11 to 12, 2017. Marchers included members of the alt-right, neo-Confederates, neo-fascists, white nationalists, white supremacists, neo-Nazis, Klansmen, and far-right militias. The organizers' stated goals included the unification of the American white nationalist movement and opposing the proposed removal of the statue of General Robert E. Lee from Charlottesville's former Lee Park.

The event had hundreds of participants and sparked a national debate over Confederate iconography, racial violence, and white supremacy. The rally occurred amid the controversy which was generated by the removal of Confederate monuments by local governments following the Charleston church shooting in 2015, in which a white supremacist shot and killed nine at a black church.

The rally turned violent after protesters clashed with counter-protesters, resulting in more than 30 injured. In the afternoon of August 12, self-identified white supremacist James Alex Fields Jr. deliberately rammed his car into a crowd of counter-protesters about 1/2 mile (800 m) away from the rally site, killing Heather Heyer and injuring 35 people. Fields fled the scene in his car but was arrested soon afterward. In 2018, he was tried and convicted in Virginia state court of first-degree murder, malicious wounding, and other crimes. The following year, Fields pleaded guilty to 29 federal hate crimes in a plea agreement to avoid the death penalty in this trial.

US president Donald Trump's remarks about the rally generated negative responses, which were criticized as implying a moral equivalence between the far-right protesters and the counter-protesters. The rally and resulting death and injuries resulted in a backlash against white supremacist groups in the United States. After Charlottesville refused to approve another march, Unite the Right held an anniversary rally on August 11–12, 2018, called "Unite the Right 2", in Washington, D.C.

== Description ==
The Unite the Right rally was a white supremacist rally that took place in Charlottesville, Virginia, from August 11 to 12, 2017. Marchers included members of the alt-right, neo-Confederates, neo-fascists, white nationalists, neo-Nazis, Klansmen, and far-right militias. Some groups chanted racist and antisemitic slogans and carried weapons, Nazi and neo-Nazi symbols, the valknut, Confederate battle flags, Deus vult crosses, flags, and other symbols of various past and present antisemitic and anti-Islamic groups. The organizers' stated goals included the unification of the American white nationalist movement and opposing the proposed removal of the statue of General Robert E. Lee from Charlottesville's former Lee Park. The event had hundreds of participants.

The rally turned violent after protesters clashed with counter-protesters, resulting in more than 30 injured. On the morning of August 12, Virginia governor Terry McAuliffe declared a state of emergency, stating that public safety could not be safeguarded without additional powers. Within an hour, at 11:22 a.m., the Virginia State Police declared the rally to be an unlawful assembly.

At around 1:45 p.m., self-identified white supremacist James Alex Fields Jr. deliberately rammed his car into a crowd of counter-protesters about 1/2 mile (800 m) away from the rally site, killing Heather Heyer and injuring 35 people. Fields fled the scene in his car but was arrested soon afterward. He was tried and convicted in Virginia state court of first-degree murder, malicious wounding, and other crimes in 2018, with the jury recommending a sentence of life imprisonment plus 419 years. The following year, Fields pleaded guilty to 29 federal hate crimes in a plea agreement to avoid the death penalty in this trial.

The rally sparked a national debate over Confederate iconography, racial violence, and white supremacy. US president Donald Trump's remarks about the rally generated negative responses. In his initial statement following the rally, Trump condemned the "display of hatred, bigotry, and violence on many sides". This first statement and his subsequent defenses of it, Trump referred to "very fine people on both sides" while clarifying that he was not referring to the neo-Nazis and white nationalists. These statements were criticized as implying a moral equivalence between the far right protesters and the counter-protesters.

The rally and resulting death and injuries resulted in a backlash against white supremacist groups in the United States. A number of groups that participated in the rally had events canceled by universities, and their financial and social media accounts closed by major companies. Some Twitter users led a campaign to identify and publicly shame marchers at the rally from photographs; at least one rally attendee was dismissed from his job as a result of the campaign. While the organizers intended for the rally to unite far-right groups with the goal of playing a larger role in American politics, the backlash and resultant infighting between alt-right leaders has been credited with causing a decline in the movement.

== Background ==
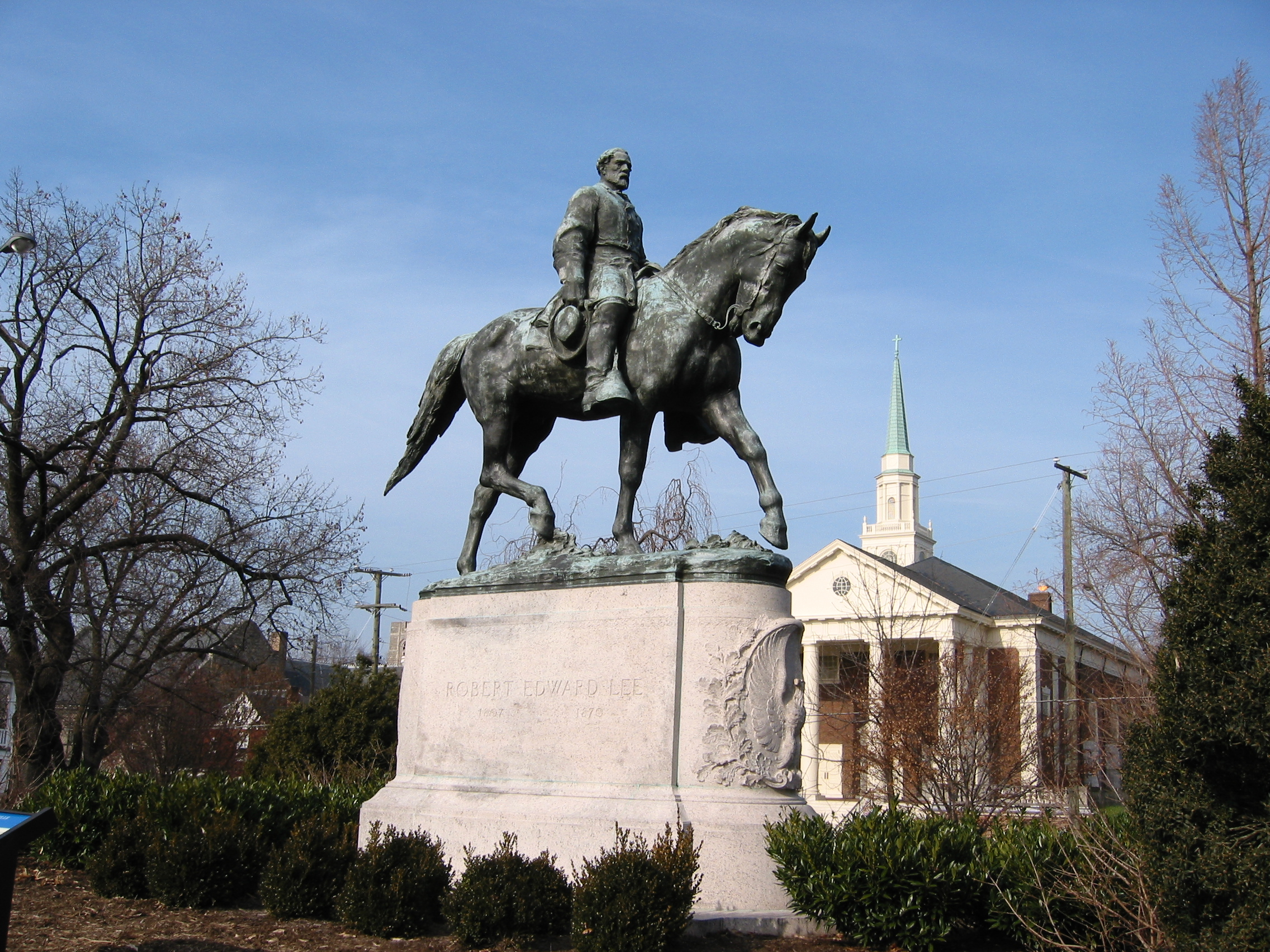
The Robert Edward Lee statue in what was then known as Lee Park

The rally occurred amid the controversy which was generated by the removal of Confederate monuments by local governments following the Charleston church shooting in 2015, in which Dylann Roof, a white supremacist, shot and killed nine members of a black church, including the minister (a state senator), and wounded another member of the church. In the wake of the Charleston church shooting in June 2015, efforts were made across the South to remove Confederate monuments from public spaces and rename streets honoring notable figures from the Confederacy. While often successful, these efforts faced a backlash from people concerned about protecting their Confederate, euphemistically "southern", heritage. The August 11–12 Unite the Right rally was organized by Charlottesville native and white supremacist Jason Kessler to protest the Charlottesville City Council's decision to remove the Robert E. Lee statue honoring the Confederate general, as well as the renaming of the statue's eponymous park (renamed to Emancipation Park in June 2017, and again to Market Street Park in 2018). Kessler took up the cause in March 2016 when then Charlottesville Vice Mayor Wes Bellamy held a press conference to call for removal of the statue. Kessler called Bellamy "anti-white" and the demand to remove the statue an effort to "attack white history". Lee Park became the site of numerous neo-Confederate events throughout the spring of 2017, including a campaign rally by Virginia Republican gubernatorial candidate Corey Stewart, which further politicized this public space.

=== Summer rallies in Charlottesville ===
On May 13, 2017, National Policy Institute Chairman and white supremacist Richard Spencer led a nighttime rally in Charlottesville to protest the city's plans to remove the statue of Lee. The event involved over 100 protesters, from various alt-right groups from around the country, chanting "You will not replace us!", "Jews will not replace us!" and "Russia is our friend!" while holding lit torches near the statue, a spectacle which many Charlottesville residents found intimidating, and which the mayor denounced as a "harken[ing] back to the days of the KKK." The next night, hundreds of anti-racist Charlottesville residents held a candlelight counterprotest in response. Throughout early to mid-2017, tensions mounted as neo-Confederate and alt-right groups' sporadic gatherings in Charlottesville's downtown parks and pedestrian mall were confronted by anti-racist activists, resulting in occasional scuffles and some arrests. On July 8, 2017, the Loyal White Knights of the Ku Klux Klan, a group from Pelham, North Carolina, held a rally at the Stonewall Jackson statue in Charlottesville. In opposition to the rally, the Charlottesville Clergy Collective created a safe space two blocks from the Klan rally at First United Methodist Church, which was used by over 600 people. About 50 Klan members were drowned out by 1,000 counterprotesters (including 23 civil disobedience activists arrested for attempting to block the Klan group's entry into the park), who gathered at a loud but nonviolent rally dubbed by anti-racist organizers as the "#BlocKKKParty". After the Klan group's departure the Charlottesville Police Department declared the remaining counterprotesters to be an unlawful assembly, and ordered their dispersal – an order which, given the din of the crowd and the police helicopter hovering overhead, went unheard by many in the crowd. Although the Charlottesville chief of police had denied permission for the measure, the Virginia State Police acted upon an order and fired three tear gas canisters into a group of counterprotesters. Police and city government officials later defended the action, which anti-racist counter-demonstrators and legal observer organizations characterized as police brutality. The resulting mistrust between law enforcement and local activists clouded the remainder of the summer, setting the stage for the August 12 Unite the Right rally.

=== Protesters ===
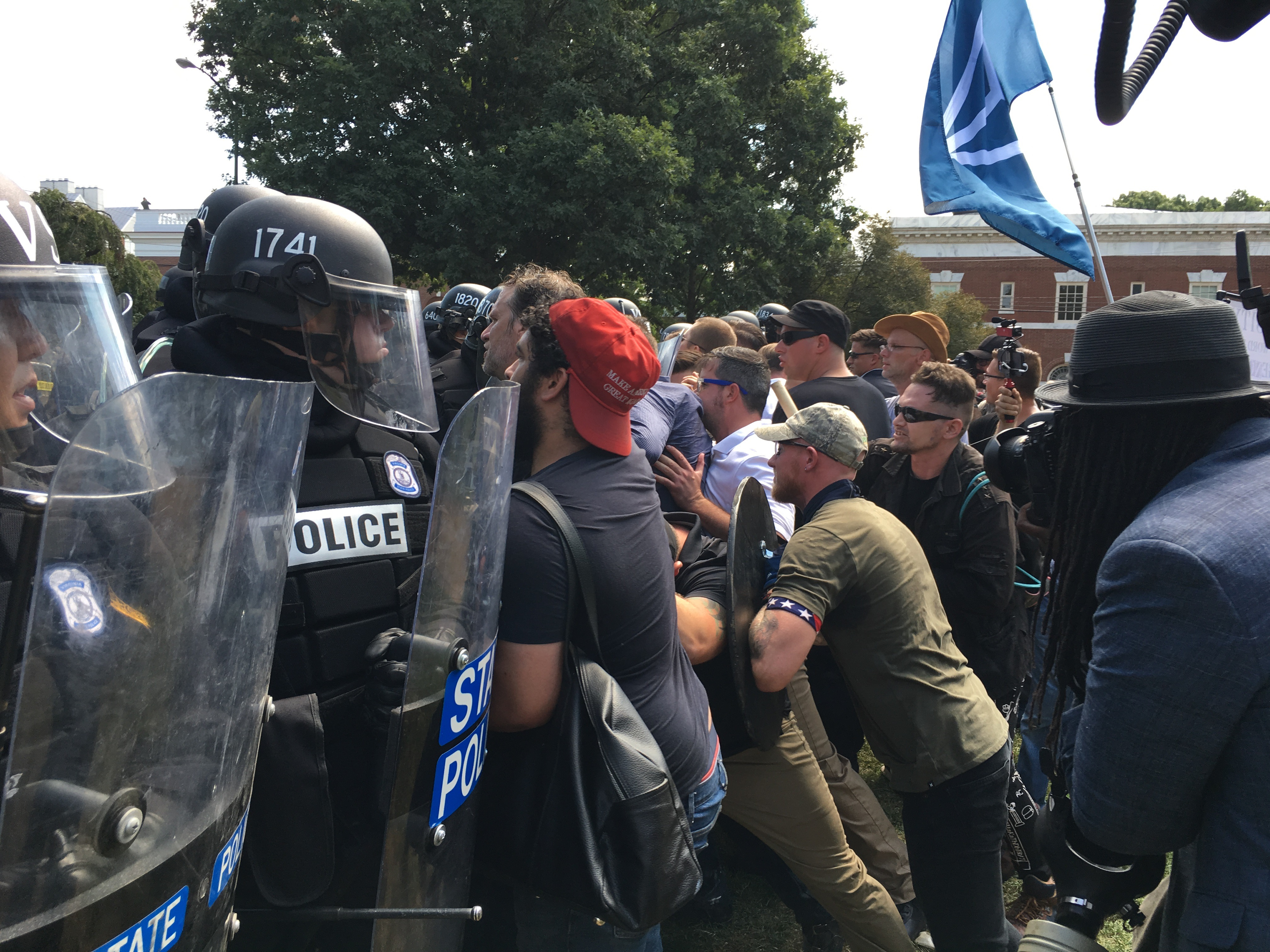
White supremacists clash with police.

Among the far-right groups engaged in organizing the march were the Stormer Book Clubs (SBCs) of the neo-Nazi news website The Daily Stormer, The Right Stuff, the National Policy Institute, and four groups that form the Nationalist Front: the neo-Confederate League of the South and Identity Dixie, the neo-Nazi groups Traditionalist Worker Party, Vanguard America, and the National Socialist Movement. Other groups involved in the rally were the Ku Klux Klan (specifically the Loyal White Knights and the Confederate White Knights branches), the Fraternal Order of Alt-Knights, the neo-Nazi White supremacist group Identity Evropa (since rebranded as the 'American Identity Movement'), the Southern California-based fight club Rise Above Movement, the American Guard, the Detroit Right Wings – who were condemned by the Detroit Red Wings NHL team for their use of the team's logo, True Cascadia, the Canada-based ARM (Alt-Right Montreal) and Hammer Brothers, and Anti-Communist Action.

Prominent far-right figures in attendance included Spencer, entertainer and internet troll Baked Alaska, lawyer Augustus Invictus, former Ku Klux Klan Imperial Wizard David Duke, Identity Evropa leader Nathan Damigo, Traditionalist Workers Party leader Matthew Heimbach, Right Stuff founder Mike Enoch, Joshua Jordan (otherwise known as Eric Striker) of The Daily Stormer and the Traditionalist Workers Party, League of the South founder and leader Michael Hill, Red Ice host and founder Henrik Palmgren, The Rebel Media commentator Faith Goldy, Right Side Broadcasting Network host Nick Fuentes, YouTube personality James Allsup, Altright.com European editor Daniel Friberg, former Business Insider CTO Pax Dickinson, Right Stuff blogger Johnny Monoxide, Daily Stormer writers Robert "Azzmador" Ray and Gabriel "Zeiger" Sohier-Chaput, Daily Caller contributor and rally organizer Jason Kessler, and Radical Agenda host Christopher Cantwell.

Gavin McInnes, the leader of the self-described "Western chauvinist" Proud Boys was invited to attend but declined because of an unwillingness "to be associated with explicit neo-Nazis" although the militia wing of the group, the aforementioned Fraternal Order of the Alt-Knights, did attend. In June, according to the Southern Poverty Law Center's Hatewatch blog, ahead of the rally, McInnes declared that "we need to distance ourselves from them", but "after backlash to the original disavowal flared-up from Alt-Right circles, the statement was withdrawn and replaced with another distancing the Proud Boys from the event yet also encouraging those who 'feel compelled' to attend".

Teddy Joseph Von Nukem later rose to fame after being photographed in the most widely recognized images of the protest.

Airbnb cancelled a number of bookings and accounts when it learned that they were being used by attendees at the rally, citing a request that users endorse a commitment to "accept people regardless of their race, religion, national origin, ethnicity, disability, sex, gender identity, sexual orientation, or age".

In February 2023, the city of Enid, Oklahoma, elected Judson Blevins, a participant in the rally and a former Oklahoma organizer for Identity Evropa, to its city commission. Blevins has faced opposition from the community since taking office in May 2023. Although city commissioners tabled a measure to censure Blevins, citizens collected enough signatures for a recall election in April 2024. Retired pastor and former Republican congressional candidate Wade Burleson is among Blevins' supporters. Blevins lost the recall, by 268 votes.

=== Militias ===
Numerous armed, right-wing militia groups were present at the rally, claiming to be there to protect the First Amendment rights of the demonstrators. Groups involved included the Pennsylvania Light Foot Militia, the New York Light Foot Militia, the Virginia Minutemen Militia, and the 3 Percenters.

=== Counter-protesters ===
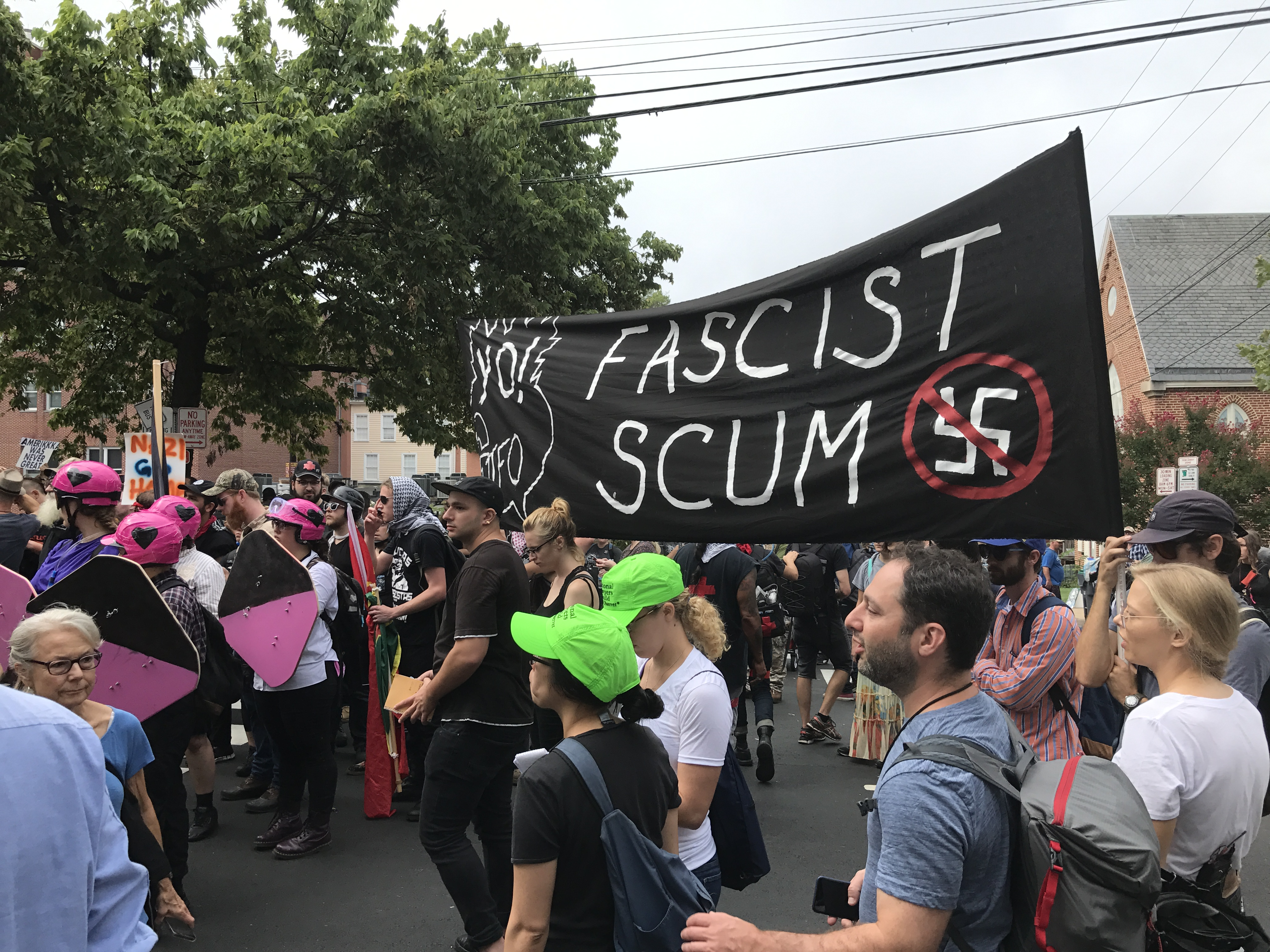
Anti-fascist counter-protesters near Emancipation Park

Those who marched in opposition to the rally were unified in opposition to white supremacy, but "espoused a wide array of ideological beliefs, preferred tactics and political goals. A large number were ordinary residents of Charlottesville who wanted to show their disdain for white supremacist groups, particularly after the Ku Klux Klan held a rally in the city on July 8." Ahead of the rally, an array of "faith-based groups, civil rights organizations, local businesses, and faculty and students at the University of Virginia" planned counterprotests. In July 2017, the ecumenical and interfaith clergy group Congregate Charlottesville called for a thousand members of the clergy to counterprotest at the rally. The Charlottesville House of Prayer also gathered at the site to pray. Groups counterprotesting included representatives from the National Council of Churches, Black Lives Matter, Anti-Racist Action, the Democratic Socialists of America, the Workers World Party, the Revolutionary Communist Party, Refuse Fascism, Redneck Revolt, the Industrial Workers of the World, the Metropolitan Anarchist Coordinating Council, and Showing Up for Racial Justice. Members of the antifa movement were also in attendance. Some counter-protesters came armed.

=== University and city preparations ===
The rally was scheduled between the summer and fall terms of the University of Virginia (UVA). On August 4, the university's president, Teresa Sullivan, sent an email to students and faculty, which said, "I urge students and all UVA community members to avoid the August 12 rally and avoid physical confrontation generally. There is a credible risk of violence at this event, and your safety is my foremost concern." The University of Virginia Medical Center canceled all elective surgeries and preemptively activated its emergency response plan. Fearing possible violence, the Virginia Discovery Museum and some downtown businesses closed for the day of the rally.

Virginia Secretary of Public Safety and Homeland Security Brian Moran said that the state had made a number of security recommendations to the city for the event, including banning weapons and sticks; designating certain parking areas, and blocking traffic for at least 10 blocks. The city did not enact any of these restrictions; city manager Maurice Jones said that city ordinances made it impossible for the city to enact some of the state's suggestions.

== Timeline of events ==
=== Permits and court case ===
Organizer Jason Kessler applied for a permit from the City of Charlottesville to hold the event at Lee Park. The week before the event, the city government – including Charlottesville mayor Michael Signer, city council, City Manager Maurice Jones, and Police Chief Al Thomas – said they would approve the permit only if the event was moved to the larger McIntire Park. The city's leaders cited safety concerns and logistical issues associated with holding the event at Lee Park, which is adjacent to the densely populated Downtown Mall. Kessler refused to relocate the rally, but the city overruled him and announced that the rally was to be moved to McIntire Park, a decision praised by the Downtown Business Association of Charlottesville.

Video recorded by Kessler and posted to YouTube after obtaining permission for the rally

Kessler, supported by the Rutherford Institute and the ACLU, sued the City of Charlottesville and Jones on First Amendment grounds in the U.S. District Court for the Western District of Virginia. On the evening of August 11, the night before the rally, Judge Glen E. Conrad granted an emergency injunction declaring that the Unite the Right rally could go forward at Lee Park as originally planned. Conrad cited several factors in his decision: that Lee Park was where the Robert E. Lee statue, the primary reason for the rally, was located; that resources would be needed at both parks for both the rally and the counterprotesters; and that the decision to move the rally to McIntire Park was due to the organizers' viewpoints and not the safety of the public. The court's decision was praised by the ACLU.

Signer issued a statement saying: "While the City is disappointed by tonight's ruling, we will abide by the judge's decision. ... Chief Thomas, his team and the hundreds of law enforcement officials in our City will now turn their full attention to protecting the Downtown area during tomorrow's events." Following the rally, on August 17, the executive director of the ACLU announced that "the ACLU will no longer defend hate groups protesting with firearms."

Before the rally, counterprotesters obtained permits to gather at McGuffey Park and Justice Park, both less than one-quarter mile (400 m) from Lee Park. Charlottesville City Council spokeswoman Miriam I. Dickler later stated that counterprotesters did not need permits to protest the rally at Lee Park.

=== August 11 ===
Video recorded by white nationalist marchers on August 11

On the evening of Friday, August 11, a group of white nationalists – variously numbered from "dozens" to "about 250" – gathered for an unannounced (and unsanctioned by the city) march through the University of Virginia's campus. They marched towards the university's Lawn chanting Nazi and white supremacist slogans, including "White lives matter"; "You will not replace us"; and "Jews will not replace us". (The phrase "You will not replace us" has been reported by the Anti-Defamation League to "reflect the white supremacist world view that ... the white race is doomed to extinction by an alleged 'rising tide of color' purportedly controlled and manipulated by Jews".) The Nazi slogan "Blood and Soil" was also used. The group was primarily composed of white men, many of them wielding tiki torches.

At the Rotunda, the group encountered a group of about 30 counterprotesters, mostly UVA students, who had locked arms around a statue of Thomas Jefferson. The white nationalists encircled the smaller group of counterprotesters at the base of the statue, and a brawl ensued. Several people on both sides were reportedly hit with pepper spray, and several people were treated for minor injuries. The white nationalists began swinging and throwing their lit tiki torches amid the chaos. It was several minutes before Virginia State Police came to break up the brawl.

Meanwhile, clergy led a pre-planned ecumenical Christian and interfaith prayer service at St. Paul's Memorial Church on University Avenue in opposition to the Unite the Right rally.

The Cavalier Daily reported, "While waiting for rides at Nameless Field after the march, several of the 'alt-right' protesters hurled antisemitic, homophobic and misogynistic slurs at several reporters and community members asking them questions. One man asking questions was thrown to the ground and surrounded by marchers after a brief physical altercation." Signer condemned the gathering, writing: "When I think of candlelight, I want to think of prayer vigils. Today, in 2017, we are instead seeing a cowardly parade of hatred, bigotry, racism, and intolerance march." UVA president Sullivan at first denied, then later minimized, the university administration's prior knowledge of the impending August 11 torch rally. But subsequent reporting revealed that, throughout the week, university police had been in contact with Identity Evropa leader Eli Mosley about the planned route of the Friday night march through the campus and that university officials had also ignored warnings relayed by their own faculty six hours before the torch rally and under-estimated the threat of violence posed by the alt-right group led by UVA alumnus Spencer. The assaults upon UVA students on the night of August 11 presaged more violence at the Unite the Right rally the next day.

=== August 12 ===
MSNBC coverage of the rally

Protesters and counterprotesters began gathering as early as 8 a.m. at Emancipation Park in anticipation of the rally, which was slated to begin at noon and last until 5 p.m.

White nationalist protesters again chanted white supremacist and Nazi-era slogans. Some waved Confederate flags, and others held posters targeting Jews that read "The Goyim Know" and "the Jewish media is going down". Protesters also shouted racial slurs and "Jew" when Signer was mentioned, and some waved Nazi flags and signs claiming, among other things, that "Jews are Satan's children." Dozens of protesters wore Trump's red "Make America Great Again" campaign hats.

Saturday morning, Sabbath worshippers at synagogue Beth Israel, faced with men in fatigues with semiautomatic rifles across the street, and a call on Nazi web sites to burn their building, felt it prudent to exit the synagogue through a back door, carrying the synagogue's Torah scrolls with them for safekeeping.

Alt-right members, including Enrique Tarrio, march and blast air-horns in front of clergy and counterprotesters who sing "This Little Light of Mine". Lee statue visible in background

Counterprotests began with an interfaith, interracial group of clergy who linked arms, prayed, and sang songs of peace, such as "This Little Light of Mine". Later in the day, counterprotesters chanted slogans including "Kill All Nazis" and "punch a Nazi in the mouth". The armed leftist group Redneck Revolt posted on their website: "To the fascists and all who stand with them, we'll be seeing you in Virginia." Harvard professor Cornel West, who organized some of the counter-demonstrators, said that a group of "20 of us who were standing, many of them clergy, we would have been crushed like cockroaches if it were not for the anarchists and the anti-fascists who approached, over 300, 350 anti-fascists". West stated, "The neofascists had their own ammunition. And this is very important to keep in mind, because the police, for the most part, pulled back."

The laws of Virginia allows the open carrying of firearms, and many demonstrators and counter-demonstrators were armed, some with semi-automatic weapons. This presented major challenges for police at the scene. Many of the protesters and counter-protesters carried shields, sticks, and clubs, as well as body armor and helmets.

At the rally, Richard W. Preston, the self-identified Imperial Wizard of the Maryland-based Confederate White Knights of the Ku Klux Klan, was caught on video firing a pistol at Corey A. Long, an African-American counter-protester who had been carrying an aerosol can with ignited spray. Preston was later found guilty of firing a weapon within 1,000 feet (300 m) of a school after pleading no contest.

Long was charged with misdemeanor assault and disorderly conduct. Long's assault charges were dismissed when the prosecutor, Commonwealth Attorney Joe Platania, could not produce the alleged victim, Harold Crews. Long had struggled with Crews over a flagpole wielded by Crews. Platania asked the judge not to impose any actual incarceration, saying that Long was always polite and voluntarily spoke with detectives about the incident. Long was convicted of disorderly conduct and sentenced to 20 days in jail, 340 more days suspended, and 100 hours of community service.

A bystander testified at Long's trial that someone behind him yelled, "Kill the nigger!" regarding Long, and he turned to see Preston and another man advancing toward Long, with Preston pulling a pistol. He said he feared that Long, who was standing on a low wall, would be killed. He said the shot fired by Preston hit the dirt next to Long's feet.

'Altercations at Charlottesville Rally'. Video from Voice of America

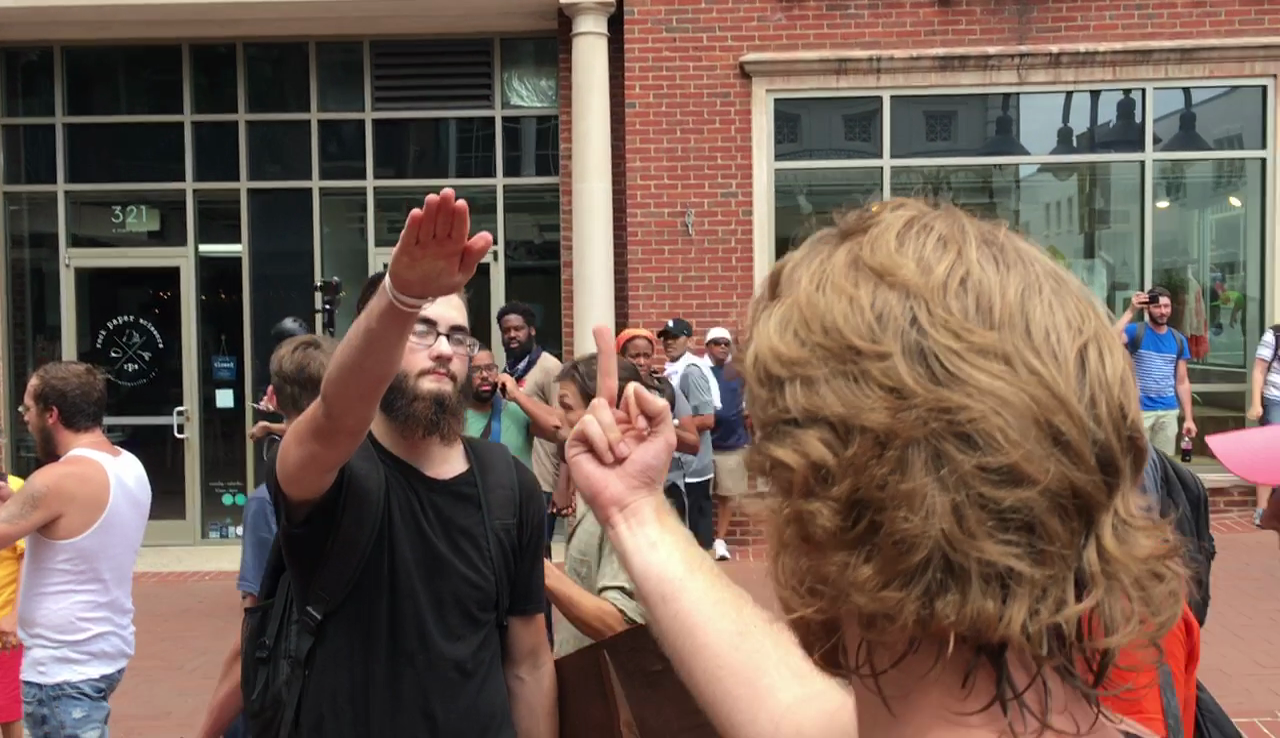
An attendee giving a Nazi salute is given the finger by a counterprotestor in response.

Beginning in the morning, ahead of the rally's official noon start time, "protesters and counterprotesters faced off, kicking, punching, hurling water bottles at and deploying chemical sprays against one another". An estimated 500 protesters and more than a thousand counterprotesters were on the site. The Associated Press reported that "people threw punches, screamed, set off smoke bombs, hurled water bottles and unleashed chemical sprays"; some engaged in combat while "others darted around, trying to avoid the chaos". At least 14 people were injured in street brawls. Following the rally, four warrants for the arrest of white supremacist Christopher Cantwell were issued after Cantwell was charged by Virginia prosecutors with felonies related to "illegal use of gases, and injury by caustic agent or explosive". Separately, The Hill journalist Taylor Lorenz claimed she was punched by counter-protesters during the violence, while video posted to social media showed a male protester punching a woman as the crowd left Lee Park; both men were arrested the same day. Both later pleaded guilty to misdemeanor assault and battery. Steven Balcaitis, of York, South Carolina, was arrested for assault and battery for choking a counter-protester in an attack that was captured on video. Balcaitis pled guilty to assault and received a 180-day suspended sentence.

Police clearing the area

U.S. Marine Vasillios Pistolis, a member of the terrorist group Atomwaffen Division, was recorded yelling "White Lives Matter" and "You will not replace us!" with his fellow protesters; he later bragged that he had assaulted a trans woman with a modified version of the Confederate flag containing the Black Sun. He was later court-martialed by the United States Marine Corps for disobeying orders and making false statements in June 2018 and sentenced to a month's confinement and a presumed discharge thereafter.

At 11:00 a.m. on the August 12, the City of Charlottesville declared a state of emergency, citing an "imminent threat of civil disturbance, unrest, potential injury to persons, and destruction of public and personal property". One hour later, Virginia governor Terry McAuliffe declared a state of emergency, stating: "It is now clear that public safety cannot be safeguarded without additional powers, and that the mostly-out-of-state protesters have come to Virginia to endanger our citizens and property. I am disgusted by the hatred, bigotry and violence these protesters have brought to our state."

At 11:22 a.m., before the rally was scheduled to begin, Virginia State Police declared the gathering an unlawful assembly via megaphones, and riot police cleared the scene. Following this, "a hard core of about 100 far-right protesters" moved to McIntire Park about 2 miles (3 km) away, where they gathered to hear speakers who had been scheduled for the "Unite the Right" event.

== Related events ==
=== Vehicular attack and homicide ===
==== Overview ====
Video of the vehicular ramming that killed one person and injured 19

After the aborted rally, at around 1:45 p.m., James Alex Fields Jr. drove his car into a crowd of counter-protesters, hitting several, before slamming into a stopped sedan, which in turn struck a stopped minivan; both vehicles were pushed into the crowd. Fields then reversed his car through the crowd and drove off. The attack killed one person and injured 35 others. Police determined the attack was deliberate.

The ramming occurred at a pedestrian mall near Fourth Street at Water Street, about four blocks from Lee Park (38°01′46.17″N 78°28′46.29″W). Heather D. Heyer, a 32-year-old paralegal from Charlottesville, was fatally injured in the attack and pronounced dead at the University of Virginia's University Hospital. Video footage recorded at the scene by Brennan Gilmore showed a gray 2010 Dodge Challenger accelerating towards crowds on a pedestrian mall, hitting people and sending them airborne, then reversing at high speed, hitting more people. The moment when the car was driven into the crowd was captured on video by bystanders and in aerial video footage taken by a drone. A photographer present at the scene said the car "plowed into a sedan and then into a minivan. Bodies flew. People were terrified and screaming." Bystanders said it was "definitely a violent attack", according to The Guardian. Of the 35 injured survivors, the University of Virginia Medical Center reported that five were initially in critical condition. By the afternoon of August 14, ten patients had been discharged from the hospital, and the nine remaining patients were in good condition.

==== Heather Heyer ====
Heather Danielle Heyer (May 29, 1985 – August 12, 2017) was killed in the attack. She worked as a paralegal at a law firm, and as a bartender and waitress, at the time of the rally. Heyer and a longtime friend of hers had agreed not to protest the rally, because they thought it would be too dangerous, but the night before the protests, Heyer felt compelled to go.

Heyer's mother, Susan Bro, said that she wanted Heather's name to become "a rallying cry for justice and equality and fairness and compassion". Heyer's memorial service was held at Charlottesville's Paramount Theatre on August 16; Heyer's mother spoke to hundreds of mourners, asking them to honor Heyer by acting against injustice and turning "anger into righteous action".

==== Arrest of James Alex Fields Jr. ====
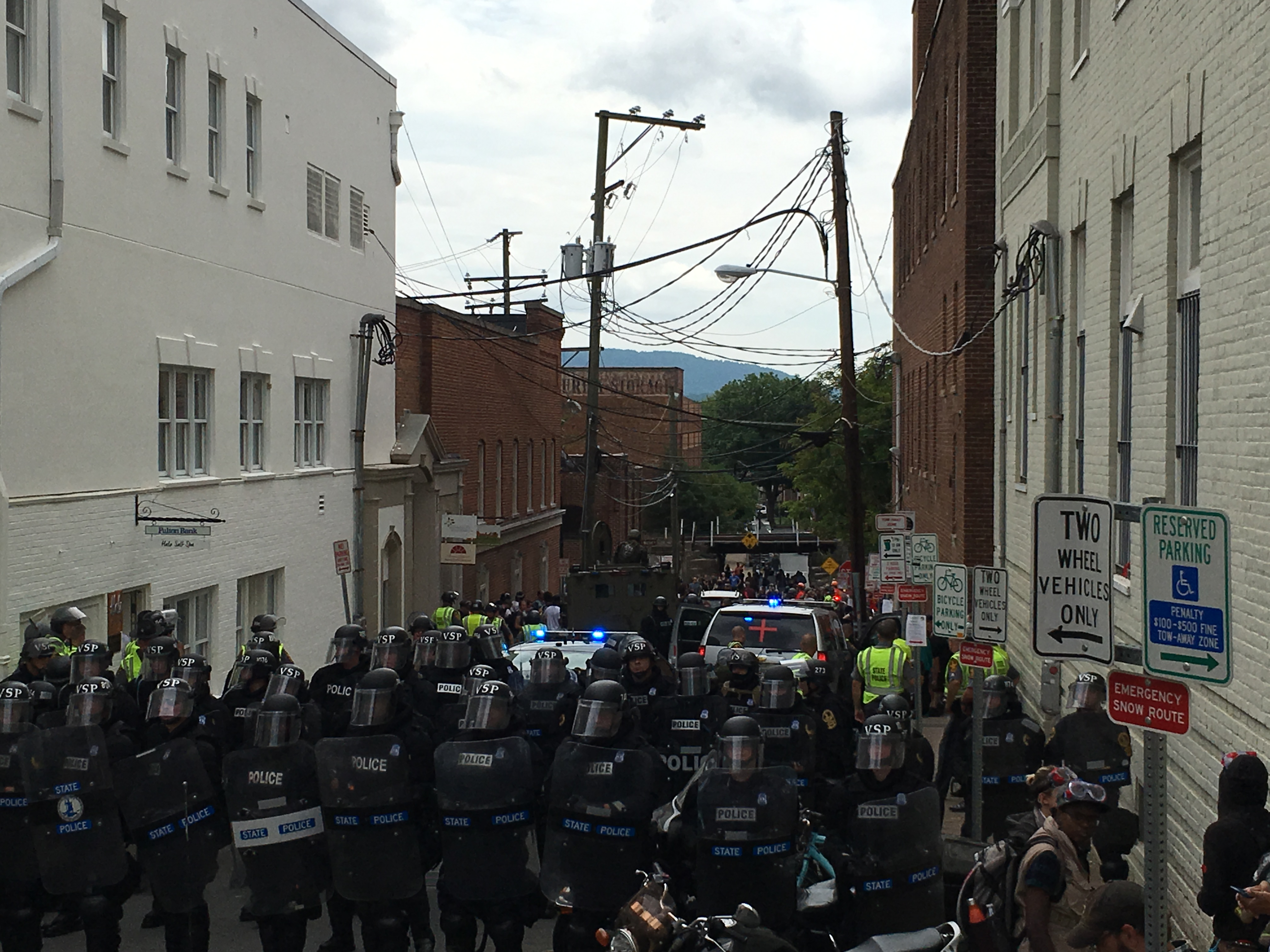
Police block the site of the vehicular crash.

Shortly after the collision, James Alex Fields Jr., a 20-year-old from Ohio who reportedly had expressed sympathy for Nazi Germany during his time as a student at Cooper High School in Union, Kentucky, was arrested and charged with second-degree murder.

Fields had been photographed taking part in the rally, holding a shield emblazoned with the logo of Vanguard America, a white supremacist organization. Vanguard America's leaders later stated he was not a member and that "The shields seen do not denote membership" as they were "freely handed out to anyone in attendance". On August 14, Fields was again denied bail. He was held at the Albemarle-Charlottesville County Regional Jail.

National Security Adviser H. R. McMaster and several U.S. senators described the alleged ramming attack as an act of domestic terrorism, as did various commentators. Late on the night of August 12, U.S. Attorney General Jeff Sessions said the U.S. Department of Justice would open a civil rights investigation into the incident; federal investigators would investigate whether the suspect "crossed state lines with the intent to commit violence". Later, Sessions said the ramming met the definition of 'domestic terrorism' and that it was "an unacceptable, evil attack".

Separate GoFundMe pages were set up for the Heyer family and for those injured in the crash; the latter was organized by the Anchorage co-chairman of the Democratic Socialists of America. The UVA Health Foundation created a fund for medical expenses of "patients at UVA Medical Center and Sentara Martha Jefferson Hospital who were injured and impacted by this unwanted violence in our community".

Two motorists injured in the vehicle incident have sued the organizers of the event and the driver.

==== Trial, conviction and sentencing ====
Fields was charged with second-degree murder, three counts of malicious wounding and failure to stop following an accident resulting in death, and held without bail. On August 18, 2017, Fields was charged with three additional counts of aggravated malicious wounding and two additional counts of malicious wounding. The murder charge was changed to first-degree murder on December 14, 2017. Footage introduced as new evidence for elevating the charges included a video from the Red Pump Kitchen (an Italian restaurant) on the northeast corner of 4th and Main and aerial footage from a Virginia State Police helicopter. Both videos were sealed by the lead prosecutor. The helicopter footage was from the same helicopter that later crashed.

On June 27, 2018, Fields was charged with multiple federal hate crimes, including one act which led to the death of Heather Heyer, and 28 counts of hate crimes "causing bodily injury and involving an attempt to kill" referring to the dozens of others injured during the attack.

Fields' trial in Virginia state court lasted two weeks. At trial, Fields did not dispute that he drove the car, but claimed that he acted out of fear and lacked the intent to kill. Video footage and eyewitness testimony showed that Fields was not under attack before he rammed his car into a crowd. Other evidence introduced at trial included a text message exchange the day before the rally, in which Fields' mother wrote to him "Be careful" and Fields responded with a picture of Adolf Hitler and the message "We're not the one[s] who have to be careful." Prosecutors also played a jailhouse phone recording of Fields after the attack, in which Fields called the slain woman's mother "a communist" and "anti-white liberal".

On December 7, 2018, Fields was found guilty of first-degree murder and nine other counts. Four days later, the jury recommended to the trial judge a sentence of life in prison plus 419 years, as well as thousands of dollars in fines; the judge accepted the jury's recommendation. The formal sentencing was scheduled to take place in March 2019, at which time the judge could impose a weaker sentence, but not a stronger one.

On March 27, 2019, Fields pleaded guilty to 29 federal crimes (out of 30 in the original federal indictment) in exchange for federal prosecutors' agreement not to seek the death penalty.

He was sentenced to life in prison on the federal charges on June 28, 2019 and given another life sentence on July 15, 2019.

=== Assault of DeAndre Harris ===
Twenty-year-old DeAndre Harris, a former special education instruction assistant from Charlottesville, was beaten in a parking garage after intervening swinging a flashlight in a struggle between Corey Long and white supremacists, an assault that was captured by photographers and video footage. Subsequent footage showed a group of six men beating Harris with poles, a metal pipe, and wooden slabs, as Harris attempted to get off the ground. He received a head laceration requiring stitches, a concussion, a knee injury, a fractured wrist, and a spinal injury. The attack was investigated by Charlottesville police, with help from the Virginia State Police and the FBI. Four men were arrested and charged with malicious wounding, a felony, in connection with the attack on Harris. Two of them, Alex Michael Ramos of Georgia, who received six years, and Jacob Scott Goodwin of Arkansas who had worn a military helmet and full-length body shield while kicking Harris on the ground, who got eight years, were convicted following jury trials in Charlottesville. Daniel Borden, of Ohio, was sentenced to nearly four years. The fourth assailant, Tyler Watkins Davis, who had struck Harris once with a flagpole and gashed his scalp badly, was sentenced to 23 months in jail. Two other assailants had not been identified, though there was video and photographs of both. Police named one "Red Beard" and the other "Preppy".

The charge against Harris arose from the claim of Harold Crews, the state chairman of the League of the South, that Harris had attacked him. In March 2018, a judge acquitted Harris, finding that while Crews was trying to retain a Confederate flag being grabbed by another black counterprotester, Harris had believed Crews was spearing the man with the flagpole, prompting Harris to act in defense of his friend.

=== Fatal helicopter crash ===
Around 4:40 p.m. on August 12, a Bell 407 helicopter (N31VA) owned by the Virginia State Police crashed 7 miles (11 km) southwest of Charlottesville-Albemarle Airport, killing two Virginia state troopers who were on board. Lieutenant H. Jay Cullen, 48, of Midlothian, Virginia, and Trooper-Pilot Berke M. M. Bates, 40, of Quinton, Virginia, were on the way to assist with security and public safety in the city. The crash was investigated by the Federal Aviation Administration, National Transportation Safety Board (NTSB), and Virginia State Police. The final report released in July 2020 determined that the helicopter crashed because the pilot lost control after entering a vortex ring state.

=== Foreign interference ===
Citing an FBI source, Virginia Representative Tom Garrett has stated that racial divisions fomented by Russian agents contributed to violence at the rally.

== Reactions ==
=== Criticism of the police's handling of the rally ===
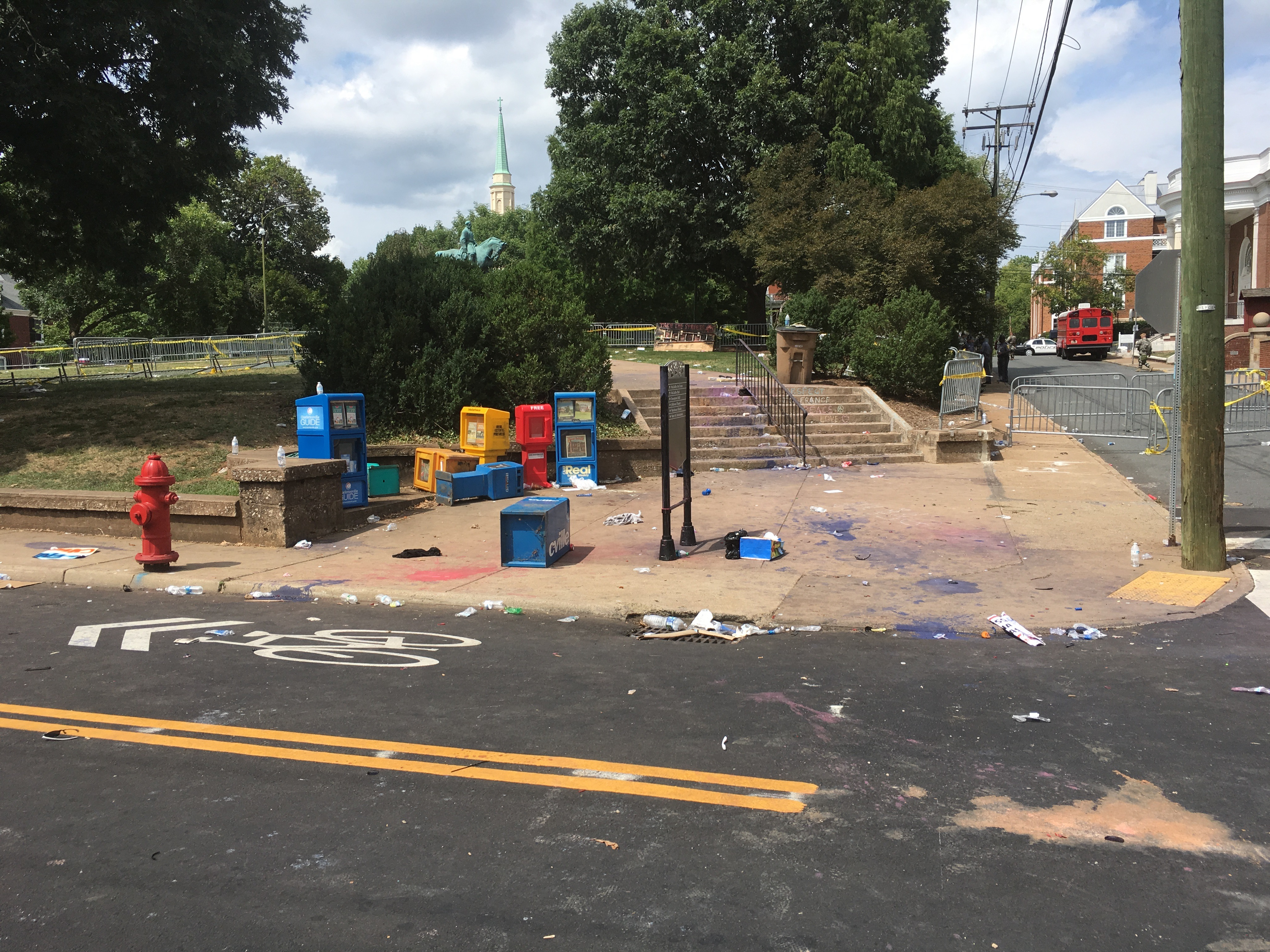
The edge of Lee Park after police cleared the area

==== ACLU's criticism, ProPublica report, and officials' response ====
In the aftermath of the rally and the car ramming, some criticized the police handling of the rally. Claire Gastañaga, executive director of the Virginia ACLU, wrote that "The situation that occurred was preventable" and the ACLU's lawsuit, which resulted in a federal court granting an injunction allowing the rally to go forward at Lee Park, "did not cause it". Gastañaga wrote that: "The lack of any physical separation of the protesters and counterprotesters on the street was contributing to the potential of violence. [Police] did not respond. In fact, law enforcement was standing passively by, waiting for violence to take place, so that they would have grounds to declare an emergency, declare an 'unlawful assembly' and clear the area."

On August 12, investigative news organization ProPublica published an article reporting that Virginia State Police troopers and Charlottesville police "wearing protective gear watched silently from behind an array of metal barricades" and allowed "white supremacists and counterprotesters to physically battle" without intervening. A. C. Thompson wrote that in "one of countless such confrontations", police watched passively as "an angry mob of white supremacists formed a battle line across from a group of counterprotesters, many of them older and gray-haired, who had gathered near a church parking lot. On command from their leader, the young men charged and pummeled their ideological foes with abandon. One woman was hurled to the pavement, and the blood from her bruised head was instantly visible."

Virginia officials defended the police actions. Governor Terry McAuliffe said police did a "magnificent job" and, "We were unfortunately sued by the ACLU, and the judge ruled against us. That rally should not have been in the middle of downtown: to disperse all those people from the park where they dispersed all over the city streets and it became a powder keg. We have to do a better job working with the judiciary. They need to listen to local city officials. ... I am angry that this was not moved to McIntire Park where the city of Charlottesville requested."

Charlottesville Police Chief Al Thomas said that while he had "regrets" about planning, police officers had attempted to separate protesters and counterprotesters but were unable to effectively do so, in part because "Unite the Right" participants had failed to follow a previously agreed-upon plan for entering Lee Park: "We had a plan to bring them in at the rear of the park. They had agreed to cooperate with the plan; unfortunately they did not follow the plan. They began entering at different locations in and around the park." Thomas also wrote: "They also chose to leave the park on a number of occasions, entering the area designated for counterprotesters, walking along the street and confronting counter-protestors." Thomas denied the implications by the Virginia ACLU that police were ordered not to intervene or make arrests, saying "There were no directives from me or any other commander to stand down or disengage" and that "there were a number of altercations throughout the area in which officers intervened".

==== Heaphy report ====
Following the rally and criticism of the police's handling of it, the City of Charlottesville hired Timothy J. Heaphy, the former U.S. Attorney for the Western District of Virginia, to undertake an independent review of the "Unite the Right" rally and two other supremacist events in the city. City officials also "urged residents to come forward with firsthand accounts of crimes that went ignored".

On December 1, 2017, Heaphy and his law firm Hunton & Williams LLP released the final report of their independent review. The detailed report was sharply critical of the city's handling of the rally. The report found that the Charlottesville Police Department had failed to adequately prepare for its events, had a flawed plan of response, and was not properly trained. The report also criticized actions by the Charlottesville City Council, attorneys from the city and state, the University of Virginia and the Virginia State Police. The report specifically found that:

- Law enforcement failed to break up fights or take an active role in preventing fights and were instructed not to intervene except in cases of "extreme violence". This decision represented "a tremendous tactical failure that has real and lasting consequences". Police supervisors "devised a poorly conceived plan that under-equipped and misaligned hundreds of officers. Execution of that plan elevated officer safety over public safety."
- Charlottesville police and Virginia State Police failed to operate under a unified command and did not even use the same radio channel.
- University of Virginia officials were aware of plans for a torchlit rally by white nationalists but "took no action to enforce separation between groups or otherwise prevent violence".

=== Responses by organizers and alt-right personalities ===
On the afternoon of August 13, Unite the Right organizer Jason Kessler attempted to hold a press conference in front of Charlottesville City Hall, but was forced to abandon the conference after being attacked by an angry crowd. One man reportedly either punched or attempted to punch Kessler, and a woman tackled Kessler as he was trying to leave the scene. Police came to Kessler's aid and escorted him from the area. Hundreds of people shouted "shame" at Kessler and "say her name" (referring to Heather Heyer, the woman killed the day before). Before ending the short news conference Kessler stated: "I disavow any political violence and what happened yesterday was tragic." He later posted videos online in which he blamed the city for the violence and death. One man was charged with misdemeanor assault and battery for allegedly spitting on Kessler during the news conference.

Speaking in an interview on the morning of the rally, former Ku Klux Klan Grand Wizard David Duke called the protests "a turning point for the people of this country. We are determined to take our country back. We're going to fulfill the promises of Donald Trump. That's why we voted for Donald Trump, because he said he's going to take our country back." Following Trump's initial comments made three days after the rally, Duke tweeted, "Thank you President Trump for your honesty & courage to tell the truth about #Charlottesville & condemn the leftist terrorists in BLM/Antifa." The Daily Stormer wrote of Trump's response, "He didn't attack us.... No condemnation at all. When asked to condemn, he just walked out of the room. Really, really good. God bless him."

Spencer, who was scheduled to speak at the Unite the Right event, said he was not responsible for the violence, and he blamed counterprotesters and police.

On August 17, White House Chief Strategist Steve Bannon, former editor of Breitbart News, the "platform for the alt-right", made an unsolicited call to the editor of The American Prospect. When the editor asked him about the "ugly white nationalism epitomized by the racist violence in Charlottesville and Trump's reluctance to condemn it," Bannon said that ethno-nationalists were losers and a fringe element played up too much by the media.

=== Vigils and protests ===
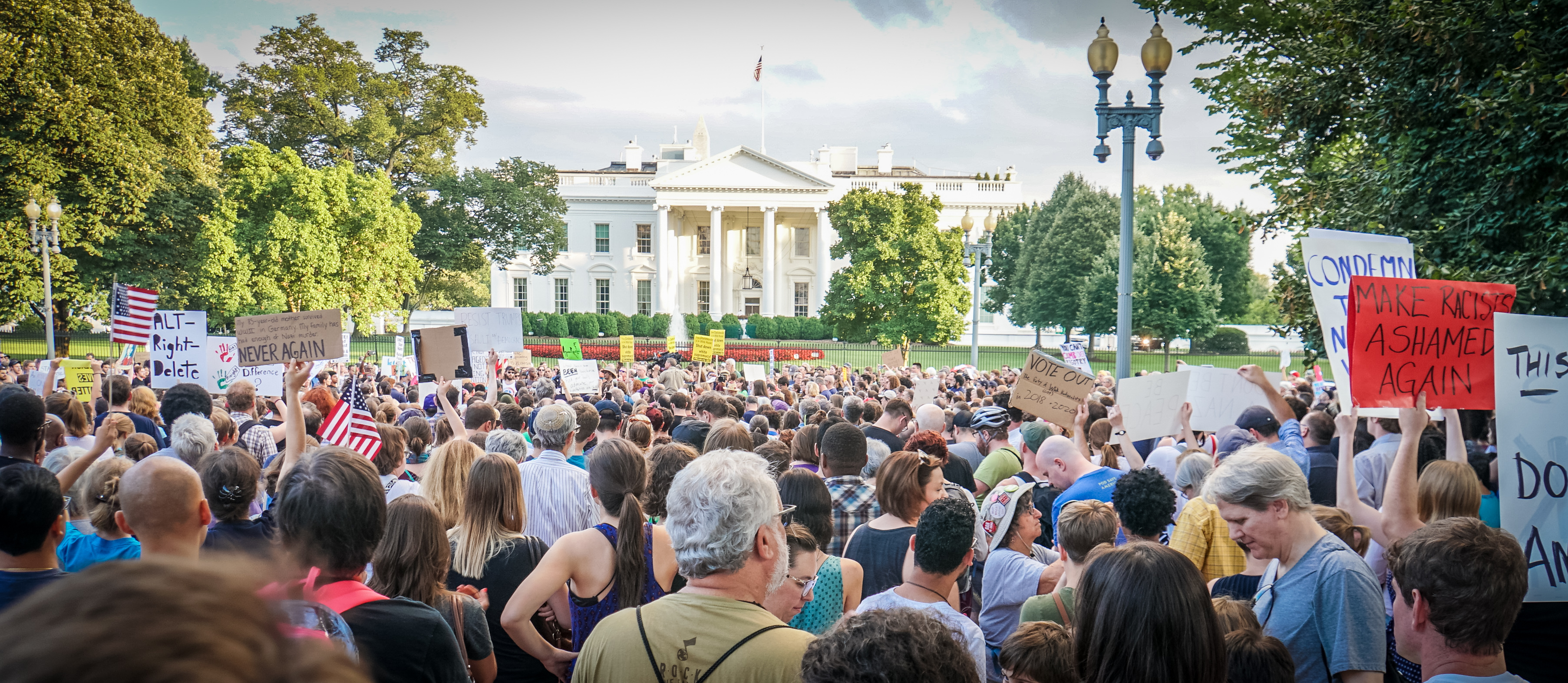
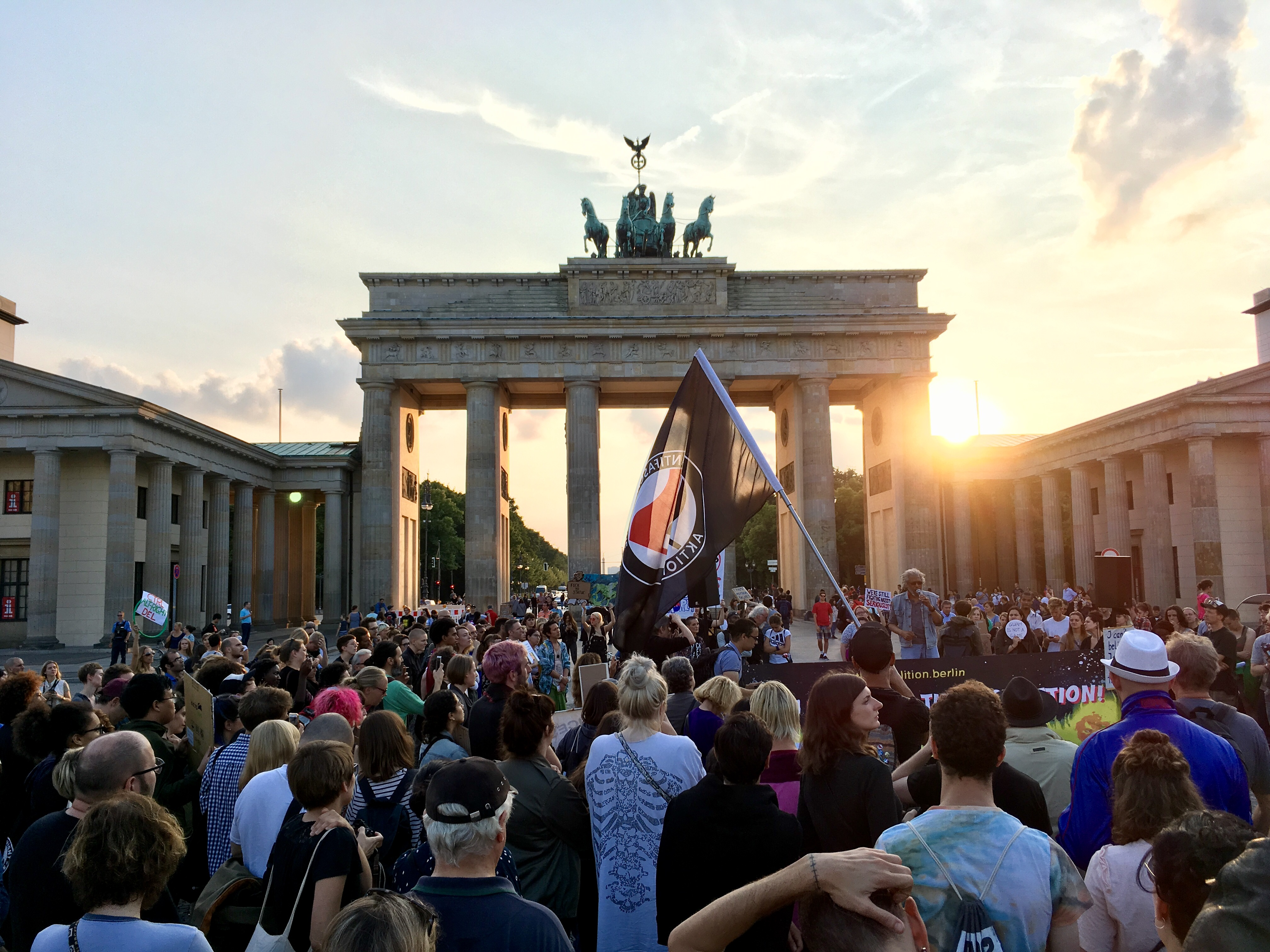
Counterprotests in Washington, D.C., Cambridge, Massachusetts, and Berlin, Germany (top-to-bottom)

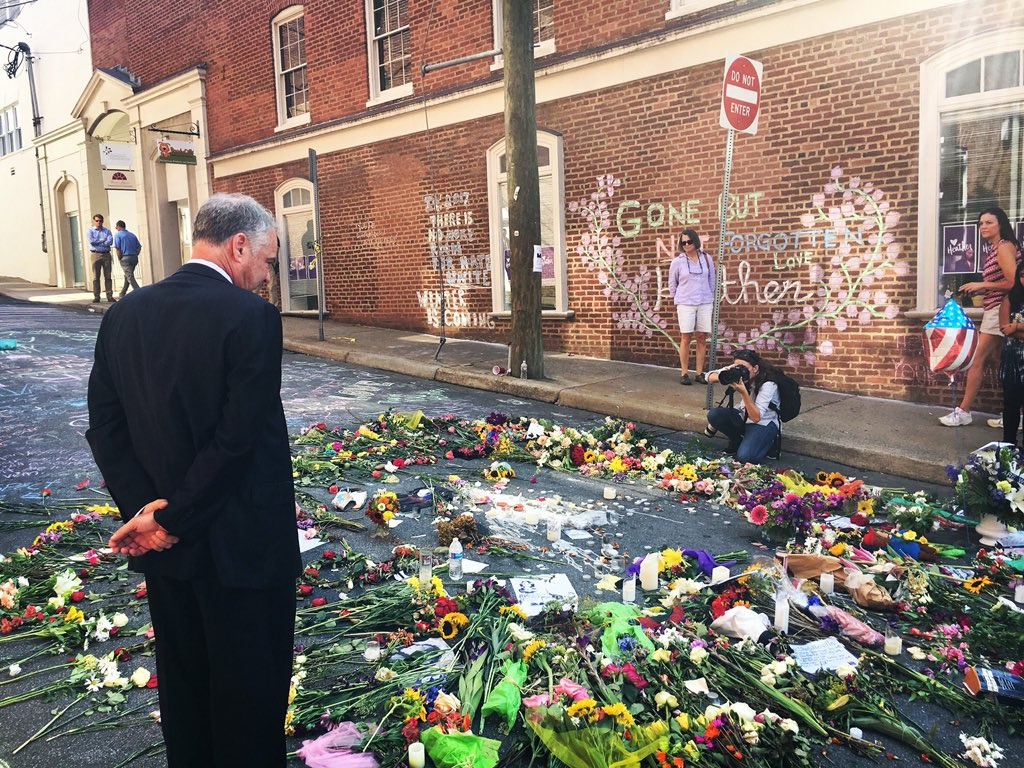
Senator Tim Kaine at impromptu memorial to Heather Heyer

On August 13, the day following the rally, many groups organized vigils and demonstrations in a number of cities across the country and abroad with a variety of goals, including showing support for those against white supremacy, pushing for the removal of Confederate monuments, and denouncing fascism and actions and statements by the president of the United States.

In Brooklyn, demonstrators at the "Peace and Sanity" rally heard addresses by Public Advocate Letitia James and City Comptroller Scott Stringer. In Los Angeles, hundreds gathered on the steps of City Hall to condemn white-nationalist violence and honor those killed.

Thousands of anti-Trump protesters marched around Trump Tower, with many shouting "Shame, shame, shame!" and "Lock Him Up!". In response, pro-Trump counterprotesters waved American flags and yelled "Make America White Again" at protesters, a play on the Trump campaign slogan Make America great again.

Voice of America report on Charlottesville rally

Confrontations at the park continued on Tuesday, August 15, with counter-protesters demanding that a North Carolina man in Confederate uniform holding a Confederate flag and semi-automatic rifle leave the park. When police asked him if he would like to leave, he said he would and was escorted to his vehicle.

=== Online responses ===
Domain registrar GoDaddy demanded that The Daily Stormer move its website's domain to another provider after editor Andrew Anglin described the car-ramming victim in derogatory terms. The Daily Stormer then moved to Google Domains on August 14. Google canceled the site's registration for violation of its terms of service just over 3 hours after The Daily Stormer registered for the service.

PayPal suspended accounts of the right-wing extremist groups run by several of the rally organizers for violating the website's terms of service, which forbid raising money for "activities that promote hate, violence or racial intolerance".

Hacktivist collective Anonymous shut down numerous websites associated with the Ku Klux Klan and neo-Nazi groups following the protests. A Discord server frequented by alt-right elements was also taken down.

Don't Be a Sucker (1943), full film

Before the suspect in the vehicular ramming on August 12 was revealed, an online campaign by far-right outlets to identify the driver of the car had been conducted. CNN reported that this was "seemingly in hopes of proving the person was not of a right-wing political persuasion" and of blaming a liberal for the attack. The far-right news website GotNews and various other outlets misidentified an innocent man as the driver. That man and his family received numerous death threats and were advised by local police to temporarily leave their home. The family sued GotNews and its editor, Charles C. Johnson, for defamation; in 2018 Johnson and the website agreed to pay the misidentified men nearly $30,000 (~$38,464 in 2025) to settle the suit. The suit continues against other "alt-right" figures who promoted the false claims.

On Twitter, a group of users identified white nationalist or supremacist marchers from photographs, publicizing at least nine names and identities. After being identified as a demonstrator at the rally, one individual resigned from his job at a hot dog stand in Berkeley, California. One such individual who remains in online far-right circles as of 2020 is Matthew Colligan, a Boston resident, friend of Baked Alaska, and promoter of the "Hitler did nothing wrong" meme.

The public shaming reportedly resulted in at least one case of mistaken identification: a University of Arkansas engineering professor was mistakenly identified as being at the rally and subsequently received threatening messages from Twitter users.

Don't Be a Sucker (1943), a short film made by the United States War Department during World War II, found a new audience for its anti-racist and anti-fascist themes. It was posted repeatedly as a viral online video.

According to journalist Angela Nagle, the Internet troll subculture on websites like 4chan and Tumblr changed as a result of the rally. Many who had seen the subculture as a game confronted the reality of other users' alt-right beliefs.

In a study published for the Journal of Public Policy & Marketing, Legocki, Walker and Kiesler (2020) found that over the 18 days following the rally, many social media users acted as "de facto police", using social media to voice concerns and demand action. In the absence of a police presence on Twitter, users directed their messages to Charlottesville City Hall and other agencies, including the FBI, to push for accountability. Concerned citizens around the world turned to Twitter to hold authorities accountable, believing the police had failed to act.

=== President Trump's response ===
Trump first responded to the torchlight parade on Friday night and the demonstrations on Saturday morning at 1:19 p.m. on Saturday, August 12, when he tweeted that "[w]e ALL must be united & condemn all that hate stands for." At a previously scheduled bill-signing ceremony two hours after the 1:45 p.m. vehicular attack, he gave a four-minute statement condemning the "display of hatred, bigotry, and violence on many sides". His remarks were criticized by the news media as well as political allies and opponents as insufficient and too vague. On August 14, he read a statement denouncing the "K.K.K., neo-Nazis, white supremacists and other hate groups ... repugnant to everything we hold dear as Americans" without taking any questions afterwards.

==== First statements ====
Speaking in New Jersey, President Donald Trump condemns the violence that occurred at the rally.

Trump did not respond to the torchlight parade on Friday night or the demonstrations on Saturday morning until 1:19 p.m. on Saturday, August 12, when he tweeted, "We ALL must be united & condemn all that hate stands for. There is no place for this kind of violence in America. Lets come together as one!"

At the bill-signing ceremony, Trump said that "we condemn in the strongest possible terms this egregious display of hatred, bigotry and violence on many sides, on many sides". He added that it had been "going on for a long time in our country. Not Donald Trump, not Barack Obama. A long, long time" and that "a swift restoration of law and order" was now vital.

A statement attributed to an unnamed White House spokesperson was released the next day, asserting that "The President said very strongly in his statement yesterday that he condemns all forms of violence, bigotry, and hatred. Of course that includes white supremacists, KKK, Neo-Nazi and all extremist groups. He called for national unity and bringing all Americans together."

Reactions to first statements

Trump's "many sides" comment was criticized as insufficient and unspecific enough to allow different interpretations. The New York Times wrote that Trump "was the only national political figure to spread blame for the 'hatred, bigotry and violence' that resulted in the death of one person to 'many sides'."

The Congressional Black Caucus decried what it saw as Trump's false equivalency and dog-whistle politics, saying "White supremacy is to blame." Virginia Attorney General Mark Herring said: "The violence, chaos, and apparent loss of life in Charlottesville is not the fault of 'many sides.' It is racists and white supremacists." Leaders of four congressional minority caucuses called on Trump to fire Bannon as well as Senior Advisor to the President Stephen Miller because of Miller's alleged white nationalist ties.

Democratic members of Congress, including Senator Brian Schatz and House Representatives Adam Schiff and Bill Pascrell, as well as some Republican members, criticized Trump's failure to name white nationalists. Senator Orrin Hatch (R-UT), whose brother was killed in action in Europe during World War II, tweeted: "We should call evil by its name. My brother didn't give his life fighting Hitler for Nazi ideas to go unchallenged here at home." Republican representative Justin Amash and senators Cory Gardner, Jeff Flake, Marco Rubio, and Ted Cruz called upon Trump to specifically condemn white supremacists and neo-Nazis.

The NAACP released a statement saying that blatant racism and race-based hatred were on display at the rally and, while they acknowledged and appreciated Trump's "disavowment of the hatred which has resulted in a loss of life today", they called on him to remove Bannon, "a well-known white supremacist leader" and "symbol of white nationalism", as an adviser. House Minority Leader Nancy Pelosi, Democratic U.S. Representative Ted Lieu, former federal government lawyers Vanita Gupta and Richard Painter, and others also called for Bannon's firing.

Former Ku Klux Klan leader David Duke said that Trump should "take a good look in the mirror & remember it was White Americans who put you in the presidency, not radical leftists." Other white supremacists and neo-Nazis did not object to Trump's remarks. Daily Stormer editor Andrew Anglin said "Trump did the opposite of cuck. He refused to even mention anything to do with us. When reporters were screaming at him about White Nationalism he just walked out of the room."

==== Second statement ====
President Trump makes second statement. (Video from Voice of America)

After the backlash for his remarks, Trump read a statement from a teleprompter two days later at the White House. He said that "anyone who acted criminally in this weekend's racist violence, you will be held fully accountable." and that "[r]acism is evil. And those who cause violence in its name are criminals and thugs, including the K.K.K., neo-Nazis, white supremacists and other hate groups that are repugnant to everything we hold dear as Americans."

Trump had traveled to Washington for matters involving trade with China. He reportedly was reluctant to issue this statement, believing his initial statement to be adequate, but White House Chief of Staff John F. Kelly persuaded him.

Reactions to second statement

The Los Angeles Times's editorial board wrote that "Trump's first response to Charlottesville was tepid and mealy mouthed. His second was too late." South Carolina Senator Tim Scott (one of three African Americans serving in the U.S. Senate, and the only Republican among the three), also said the second statement came too late. NAACP president Cornell William Brooks said Trump's second statement stuck to a "rhetorical minimum" of a condemnation and "gave the impression that the President was trying to have his hate cake and eat it too".

Richard Spencer, neo-Nazi activist dismissed Trump's second statement as "hollow", and he also said that he believed that Trump had not denounced either the alt-right movement or white nationalism.

==== Third statement ====
President Trump makes third statement (begins at 07:20 into the video) published by the White House.

On August 15, Trump appeared before news media at Trump Tower, New York City, to read prepared remarks on the U.S. infrastructure discussion and other economic issues. After reading the statement, Trump took questions from reporters who asked mostly about the Charlottesville events. Trump defended his August 12 statement and repeated his claim that there was "blame on both sides". He also defended White House advisor Steve Bannon, and accused the media of unfair treatment of the rally's participants. Trump said: "Not all of those people were neo-Nazis, believe me. Not all of those people were white supremacists by any stretch", adding in a later response that he believed there were "very fine people on both sides" and "I'm not talking about the neo-Nazis and the white nationalists, because they should be condemned totally". Trump also said that the push to remove Confederate statues was "changing history" and "changing culture".

An extended extract of Trump's remarks, with context, is given below:

TRUMP: ... you had some very bad people in that group, but you also had people that were very fine people, on both sides. You had people in that group ... that were there to protest the taking down of, to them, a very, very important statue and the renaming of a park from Robert E. Lee to another name.

REPORTER: George Washington and Robert E. Lee are not the same.

TRUMP: George Washington was a slave owner. So will George Washington now lose his status? Are we going to take down statues to George Washington? How about Thomas Jefferson? What do you think of Thomas Jefferson? You like him?

REPORTER: I do love Thomas Jefferson.

TRUMP: Okay, good. Are we going to take down the statue? Because he was a major slave owner. Now, are we going to take down his statue? So you know what, it's fine. You're changing history. You're changing culture. And you had people—and I'm not talking about the neo-Nazis and the white nationalists, because they should be condemned totally—but you had many people in that group other than neo-Nazis and white nationalists.

Trump criticized what he called the "very, very violent alt-left", and falsely stated that counter-demonstrators lacked a permit. A municipal spokeswoman said that the counter-protesters did have a permit for two other nearby parks and "counterprotesters did not need permits to protest that rally" in Lee Park.

Trump's remarks also indicated that he had watched the "tiki torch march" that moved through the University of Virginia to Robert E. Lee's statue on August 11, the night before the rally. He stated that there "were people protesting very quietly the taking down of the statue of Robert E. Lee. ... You had a lot of people in that group that were there to innocently protest, and very legally protest – because I don't know if you know, they had a permit", falsely claiming that "[t]he other group didn't have a permit."

Reactions to third statement

In an interview published the next day, Bannon said the press conference was a "defining moment" and that Trump chose to jettison the "globalists" and align himself with "his people". He said he was "proud of how [Trump] stood up to the braying mob of reporters".

More than 60 Democratic and Republican members of the U.S. House of Representatives and the United States Senate condemned Trump's remarks. Among those were Senators Bernie Sanders, John McCain, Tim Scott, Susan Collins, Chuck Schumer, Cory Booker, Elizabeth Warren, Jeff Flake, Orrin Hatch, Heidi Heitkamp, Claire McCaskill, Joe Manchin, Dean Heller and Tammy Duckworth, and House members Robert C. "Bobby" Scott, Don Beyer, Barbara Comstock, Ileana Ros-Lehtinen, Will Hurd and Gerry Connolly, as well as Ohio Governor John Kasich and former Massachusetts Governor Mitt Romney. House Minority Leader Nancy Pelosi said, "The president's continued talk of blame 'on many sides' ignores the abhorrent evil of white supremacism ..." Speaker of the House Paul Ryan stated, "We must be clear. White supremacy is repulsive. This bigotry is counter to all this country stands for. There can be no moral ambiguity."

Former presidents George H. W. Bush and George W. Bush stated that, "America must always reject racial bigotry, anti-Semitism, and hatred in all forms. As we pray for Charlottesville, we are reminded of the fundamental truths recorded by that city's most prominent citizen in the Declaration of Independence: we are all created equal and endowed by our Creator with unalienable rights. We know these truths to be everlasting because we have seen the decency and greatness of our country."

On August 16, Representatives Jerrold Nadler of New York, Pramila Jayapal of Washington state and Bonnie Watson Coleman of New Jersey unveiled a resolution that the three House Democrats co-authored, which would censure Trump for his "inadequate response to the violence", his "failure to immediately and specifically name and condemn the white supremacist groups responsible for actions of domestic terrorism", and for employing chief strategist Steve Bannon and national security aide Sebastian Gorka despite their "ties to white supremacist movements".

Criticism of the comments also extended to the corporate world; among others, 21st Century Fox CEO James Murdoch said in an email to friends that was obtained by The Hollywood Reporter, "[W]hat we watched this last week in Charlottesville and the reaction to it by the president of the United States concern all of us as Americans and free people. These events remind us all why vigilance against hate and bigotry is an eternal obligation – a necessary discipline for the preservation of our way of life and our ideals." Murdoch also pledged a $1 million donation to the Anti-Defamation League, urging his friends to also make contributions. (Murdoch's statement drew some criticism from media columnists, including The Washington Post's Jennifer Rubin and Erik Wemple, who have accused Fox News Channel for helping bring Trump to the political mainstream and its repeated defense of his administration as well as perpetuating a culture of exploiting female employees and using dog-whistle commentary on its opinion programs.)

The fallout from the third statement led to renewed calls for Trump to resign or be removed from office through either impeachment or through invocation of Section 4 of the 25th Amendment to the Constitution. In an August 15 Twitter post, Democratic House Representative Jackie Speier of California suggested that the never-before-used section of the 25th Amendment (which allows the vice president and either a majority of the cabinet or another body such as Congress to declare that a president is unable to discharge the powers and duties of his office) be invoked to remove Trump. On August 22, in an interview with Matt Lauer on the Today Show, Vice President Mike Pence passionately endorsed Trump, saying in part:

I know this president. I know his heart ... I heard it. I heard him on the day that the Charlottesville tragedy happened when he denounced hate and violence in all of its forms from wherever it comes. I heard him on that Monday, and I heard him as well on Tuesday like millions of Americans did where he condemned the hate and the bigotry that was evidenced there. He condemned the violence that was there and we'll continue to do that. We understand that criticism comes with this job, and this president has the kind of broad shoulders to be able to take it.

Democratic Rep. Steve Cohen of Tennessee announced on August 17, that he would introduce articles of impeachment against Trump for his remarks in the press conference, stating that Trump had "failed the presidential test of moral leadership". Arnold Schwarzenegger made an online video criticizing Trump's statement and presented a speech condemning the racists and stating Trump should've said something like that.

In an August 18 interview with ABC's Good Morning America, Heather Heyer's mother, Susan Bro, stated that she has not "and now ... will not" meet with Trump after hearing about his statement. Bro said, "I'm not talking to the president now. I'm sorry, after what he said about my child. It's not that I saw somebody else's tweets about him. I saw an actual clip of him at a press conference equating the protesters, like Ms. Heyer, with the KKK and the white supremacists."

The fallout from this statement also led to renewed calls for Trump to be stripped of honors he won before his presidency. Before the SummerSlam event that weekend, protesters outside the Barclays Center called for Trump's removal from the WWE Hall of Fame. Additionally, a petition to revoke Trump of an honorary law degree from Lehigh University by a recent graduate went viral following his comments, gaining more than 25,000 signatures. Trump was previously stripped of an honorary degree from Scotland's Robert Gordon University in 2015. If he loses his degree from Lehigh, Trump will only have three honorary degrees remaining; two from Liberty University and one from Wagner College. A number of alumni of Liberty University announced their intentions to return their diplomas to the university in response to university president Jerry Falwell, Jr.'s continued support of Trump.

In the days following Trump's August 15 statement, the magazines The Economist, The New Yorker, and Der Spiegel ran cover art depicting Trump wearing or interacting with a KKK hood.

Additional controversy resulted from a Facebook post by Missouri State Sen. Maria Chappelle-Nadal in which she commented, "I hope Trump is assassinated!" in response to the president's comments. In apologizing for the remark, Chappelle-Nadal said to The Kansas City Star that she posted the comment in frustration at the "trauma and despair" of Trump's statements about the Charlottesville rally. The post, which she deleted shortly after posting it but not before it was circulated online, led several state and national politicians, including U.S. Senator Claire McCaskill and House Representative Lacy Clay, to call for her resignation; State Rep. Joshua Peters also submitted a letter to State Senate President pro tempore Tom Dempsey (chairman of the Missouri Rules, Joint Rules, Resolutions and Ethics Committee) requesting that a special committee consider Chappelle-Nadal's "censure or removal" from office. Missouri State Sen. Gina Walsh (leader of the state's Senate Democratic Caucus) announced on August 22 that Chapple-Nadal had been removed from all committee assignments, commenting that the controversy had made her a "distraction" to senators.

==== Later statements ====
Trump defended his previous statements at a Phoenix, Arizona, rally on August 22, 2017. He did not mention that he had said in his first statement that "many sides" were responsible for the violence at the rally and accused people of "trying to take away our culture" and "trying to take away our history" in reference to the removal of the Confederate statues. Following criticisms from former vice president Joe Biden in a video announcing that he was entering the 2020 presidential race, Trump was asked by journalists in April 2019 to clarify his remark that there were "very fine people" on both sides of the protests at the rally. He responded that he had "answered that question, and if you look at what I said, you will see that question was answered perfectly" and that he "was talking about people that went because they felt very strongly about the monument to Robert E. Lee, a great general."

==== Resignations from and dissolution of presidential advisory councils ====
Kenneth Frazier, the CEO of Merck, resigned from the President's American Manufacturing Council on August 14, in reaction to the President's response to the rally. Trump quickly responded by attacking Frazier on Twitter. Frazier received widespread support from major figures in politics, media and business, and commentator Keith Boykin said that "It took Trump 54 minutes to condemn ... Frazier" but "two days of issuing equivocal statements" before denouncing the neo-Nazis and white supremacists who marched in Charlottesville. Under Armour founder and CEO Kevin Plank and Intel chief executive Brian Krzanich also resigned from the council that same day, followed by the resignations of AFL–CIO president Richard Trumka, economist and former AFL–CIO deputy chief of staff Thea Lee, and Alliance for American Manufacturing president Scott Paul on August 15. The following morning, two more CEOs – Denise Morrison of Campbell Soup and Inge Thulin of 3M – announced that they would resign from American Manufacturing Council. Wal-Mart CEO Doug McMillon also directly criticized Trump's leadership, saying Trump "missed a critical opportunity to help bring our country together".

On August 16, after the members of the advisory councils moved to disband, Trump dissolved both councils. Stanford Graduate School of Business professor Anat R. Admati said that Trump's equivocations on white nationalist groups had "put them in a very difficult position" and caused critical damage to the president's relationship with corporate leaders.

Sixteen of the 17 members of the President's Committee on the Arts and Humanities resigned on August 18, in protest of Trump's response to the rally. The resigning members stated in a letter to the President, "Reproach and censure in the strongest possible terms are necessary following your support of the hate groups and terrorists who killed and injured fellow Americans in Charlottesville." Representatives for the sole remaining member, film director George C. Wolfe, stated that he, too, would be resigning and would add his name to the letter. The White House responded by saying a decision had previously been made not to renew the committee after it expired later in 2017.

In late August, eight of the 28 members of the National Infrastructure Advisory Council resigned, stating in a joint letter that Trump "threatened the security of the homeland". The letter cited Trump's response to the Charlottesville rally as one of the reasons for leaving.

==== Defenses of Trump and rebuttal ====
Several conservative commentators argued that Trump was being unjustly criticized by the media and left-wing political figures for him blaming both sides. Some critics argued that members of the media were excusing the violence from activists associated with antifa, a loosely affiliated group of far-left protesters. Jonah Goldberg wrote that the presence of the alt-right did not excuse antifa from its policies that "oppose free speech, celebrate violence, despise dissent and have little use for anything else in the American political tradition". Journalists Paul Waldman and Peter Beinart criticized this argument as an ineffective tactic to defend Trump and it also stated that none of the violence from the counter-protesters justified any moral equivalency between the two sides at the rally. Beinart wrote that unlike the alt-right, antifa are not practitioners of an ideology that advocates the ethnic cleansing of other racial and religious groups nor do they "celebrate regimes that committed genocide and enforced slavery", and antifa promotes egalitarianism unlike the alt-right.

Ray Arsenault of the Tampa Bay Times wrote that although there were some violent members among their ranks, the counter-protesters were mostly made up of "peaceful activists committed to nonviolence", including several clergymen and Black Lives Matter activists. Linda Qiu of The New York Times mentioned that although both sides were violent that day, only one side—the alt-right—was responsible for a deadly act of domestic terrorism. Jonathan Tobin of The Times of Israel mentioned that the explicit presence of Nazi and Ku Klux Klan imagery from the white supremacists and Fields' attack "render irrelevant" antifa presence at the rally. Beinart and Qiu also both wrote that right-wing terrorism was far more common than left-wing terrorism.

==== Public opinion on Trump's response ====
Public opinion polls showed that reactions to Trump's response were overwhelmingly negative, receiving near universal disapproval from Democrats and only modest support from Republicans. A Washington Post/ABC News national poll of American adults taken in the aftermath of the rally showed that 56% disapproved of Trump's response to the violence in Charlottesville, while only 28% approved. The same survey showed that 83% of Americans said that holding neo-Nazi or white supremacist views is unacceptable, while 9% said holding such views was acceptable.

A Marist Poll of American adults showed that 52% believed that Trump's response to the violence in Charlottesville was "not strong enough". The same poll showed that 4% of Americans said they agreed with the beliefs of white nationalists, with 73% saying they disagreed, 7% having no opinion, and 15% unsure. The poll also showed that 67% believed that the fatal crash should be "investigated as an act of domestic terrorism", while 21% said it should not, and 12% were unsure.

A CBS News poll of American adults indicated that 55% of respondents disapproved of Trump's response, while 33% approved. A roughly similar split indicated that respondents found Trump's description of events to be inaccurate.

An Economist/YouGov poll of Americans showed that 42% of respondents disapproved of Trump's handling of "the situation in Charlottesville", while 27% approved and 31% had no opinion. When asked "which group ... is more likely to use violence"; 32% of respondents said white nationalists, 10% said anti-racism protesters, and 45% said "both equally likely", while 14% were unsure; Democrats were more likely to attribute violence to white nationalists, while Republicans were most likely to blame both sides equally.

A Siena College poll showed that 50% of New York residents gave Trump an "F" for his response to the violence.

=== Historical revisionism ===
According to analyses in the Washington Post in 2020, Trump and his supporters attempted to distort and rewrite the history of the rally, continuing to claim falsely that there were peaceful elements to the right-wing protest. Fact-checkers emphasized that the rally-goers consisted solely of neo-Nazis and white supremacists, and that "virtually anyone watching cable news coverage or looking at the pictures of the event would know that".

In 2024, Trump downplayed the rally as a "peanut" compared to the ongoing pro-Palestinian campus protests.

=== Responses by other politicians ===
Governor of Virginia Terry McAuliffe responds to the events surrounding the Unite the Right rally.

The day after the rally, Virginia Governor McAuliffe said at a press conference that he had a message for "all the white supremacists and the Nazis who came into Charlottesville today. Our message is plain and simple. Go home ... You are not wanted in this great commonwealth. Shame on you." Signer said he was disgusted that white supremacists came to his town and he faulted Trump for inflaming racial tensions during his 2016 campaign.

Atlanta mayor Kasim Reed called for city flags to be flown at half-staff, and indicated he favors renaming Confederate Avenue.

The Republican National Committee issued a statement saying it was "unified in revulsion at the abhorrent white supremacists demonstration in Charlottesville ... We urge swift and certain justice be meted out to domestic terrorists and groups aiding and abetting through the propagation of hateful ideology."

Barack Obama
(@BarackObama)
tweeted:

"No one is born hating another person because of the color of his skin or his background or his religion..."

"People must learn to hate, and if they can learn to hate, they can be taught to love..."

"...For love comes more naturally to the human heart than its opposite." – Nelson Mandela

August 12, 2017

In a series of tweets, former president Barack Obama quoted Nelson Mandela. Three days later, the thread's first tweet became the most-liked Twitter post of all time. Former presidents George H. W. Bush and George W. Bush condemned the rally in a joint statement, saying that "America must always reject racial bigotry, anti-Semitism, and hatred in all forms".

On April 25, 2019, former vice president Joe Biden launched his presidential campaign with a video condemning the events of Charlottesville and Trump's response to it, arguing that "with those words, the President of the United States assigned a moral equivalence between those spreading hate and those with the courage to stand against it, and at that moment, I knew the threat to this nation was unlike any I had ever seen in my lifetime."

==== Germany ====
German Chancellor Angela Merkel called the violence "horrifying" and "evil" and said: "It is racist, far-right violence and clear, forceful action must be taken against it, regardless of where in the world it happens." German Justice Minister Heiko Maas similarly condemned the violence, antisemitism, and racism of the neo-Nazis at the rally.

==== Israel ====
Israeli president Reuven Rivlin said in a statement, "The very idea that in our time we would see a Nazi flag — perhaps the most vicious symbol of anti-Semitism — paraded in the streets of the world's greatest democracy, and Israel's most cherished and greatest ally is almost beyond belief". Former Prime Minister Ehud Barak said the rally was reminiscent of recent events in Israel, citing demonstrations held by the far-right group Lehava.

Prime Minister Benjamin Netanyahu received criticism for his delayed response to the rally, in which he responded only after Trump made a statement condemning the neo-Nazis at the rally.

=== Religious responses ===
The General Secretary of the World Council of Churches, Olav Fykse Tveit, stated, "Terror and violence against peaceful people seeking justice in Charlottesville must be condemned by all ... We are proud of moral leadership by clergy and lay people standing against this promotion of racism and white supremacy."

The Presbyterian Church (U.S.A.), the United Methodist Church, the Evangelical Lutheran Church in America, and the Orthodox Church in America, all of which are members of the World Council of Churches, each individually condemned the Unite the Right rally and the racist ideology behind it, as did the Church of Jesus Christ of Latter-day Saints and the Catholic Church.

The Rabbinical Council of America, Rabbinical Assembly and United Synagogue of Conservative Judaism, and Union for Reform Judaism – representing American Orthodox, Conservative, and Reform Jews, respectively – all strongly condemned the white supremacist and neo-Nazi violence in Charlottesville. Alan Zimmerman, president of Congregation Beth Israel in Charlottesville, recalled the day's events in a blog post: "The fact that a calamity did not befall the Jewish community of Charlottesville on Saturday was not thanks to our politicians, our police, or even our own efforts, but to the grace of God. ... And yet, in the midst of all that, other moments stand out for me, as well. ... At least a dozen complete strangers stopped by the synagogue Saturday to ask if we wanted them to stand with us."

=== Academic responses ===
University of Virginia Center for Politics director Larry J. Sabato, who witnessed the torchlit rally on August 11, said that the weekend was among the university's darkest days and that he hoped that "people will put it into context and understand that we had no control over the individuals organizing it, nor the people who showed up. ... What I saw was pure evil."

According to Princeton University historian Kevin M. Kruse, there is a historical "false equivalency" precedent to blaming "both sides" in disputes over race relations. Kruse notes that segregationist politicians often equated white supremacists with the civil rights movement, condemning both the KKK and the NAACP. Various historians also questioned Trump's suggestion that the individuals calling for the removal of Confederate monuments would next demand the removal of figures like George Washington and Thomas Jefferson. Harvard historian Annette Gordon-Reed and others noted that Washington and Jefferson were imperfect men who are notable for creating the United States, whereas the sole historical significance of Confederate figures such as Robert E. Lee and Jefferson Davis is that they went to war against the United States to defend "the right of people to own other people".

Other historians noted that some wanted the Confederate monuments moved to museums where the monuments could be appropriately contextualized. Douglas A. Blackmon, senior fellow at the University of Virginia's Miller Center of Public Affairs and author of a book on slavery and its aftermath in the U.S. told The Washington Post: "Trump either does not understand the history of the Confederacy or he's sympathetic to white nationalist views. ... [T]hese statues are offensive to millions of citizens that he governs. ... When you reach a point that there are hate groups that engage in terrorist attacks, that these statues are being appropriated and used in [that] way ... simply take [them] down."

A week after Charlottesville, the Medieval Academy and 28 other scholarly groups released a statement condemning the "fantasy of a pure, white Europe that bears no relationship to reality."

=== Military's response ===
The leaders of several branches of the United States Armed Forces took to Twitter to denounce the march. Army Chief of Staff General Mark Milley, Air Force Chief of Staff General Dave Goldfein, Chief of Naval Operations Admiral John Richardson, Commandant of the Marine Corps General Robert Neller, Chief of the National Guard Bureau General Joseph Lengyel all tweeted statements condemning racial intolerance as anathema to what their institutions stand for. The 82nd Airborne Division took the opportunity to remind its Twitter followers that it had fought Nazis in Europe during World War II. Veterans groups, such as the American Legion and the Veterans of Foreign Wars, also publicly criticized the march. In 2021, the RAND Corporation released a framework to reduce the risk of extremist activity in the U.S. military.

Taken together, these responses were extremely unusual in United States history. Military leaders almost never take part in political controversies. Furthermore, in whole-heartedly condemning the march and its motives, their public comments put them at odds with the President who is the Commander in Chief of the military. Milley said that his statement was not intended to be political.

=== UN's response ===
In the United Nations Convention on the Elimination of All Forms of Racial Discrimination (CERD) August 18 report, experts recalled the "horrific events in Charlottesville of August 11–12, 2017 leading to the death of Ms. Heather Heyer, and the injuries inflicted on many other protesters, as well as the terrible beating of Mr. Deandre Harris by white supremacists". The UN Committee experts condemned "the failure at the highest political level of the United States of America to unequivocally reject and condemn" racist violence.

=== President Biden's 2021 statement ===
On International Holocaust Remembrance Day on January 27, 2021, Biden said: "The horrors we saw and heard in Charlottesville in 2017, with white nationalists and neo-Nazis spewing the same antisemitic bile we heard in the 1930s in Europe, are the reason I ran for president".

== Consequences ==
=== Financial costs ===
Albemarle County, the City of Charlottesville and the University of Virginia and its medical center collectively incurred $540,000 in costs from responding to the Ku Klux Klan rally in July 2017 and the Unite the Right rally in August 2017. Costs included police overtime and other expenses, costs from the fire department and the public works department, legal fees, and fees from a crisis communications firm. Sentara Martha Jefferson Hospital, a private hospital, spent more than $59,000.

=== Removal of statues ===
The violence in Charlottesville accelerated the removal of public Confederate statues from many U.S. cities. About twenty monuments were removed in the weeks immediately following the rally. In Baltimore, the city's four Confederate statues were removed on the night of August 15–16; Mayor Catherine Pugh said that she had ordered the overnight removals to preserve public safety. In Durham, North Carolina, a group toppled a statue outside the Old Durham County Courthouse; four activists were arrested in connection with the toppling. Three Confederate statues were also removed from the University of Texas at Austin in the aftermath of the Charlottesville violence.

In Lexington, Kentucky, Mayor Jim Gray asked the city council to approve the relocation of two statues from a courthouse. Proposals to relocate Confederate memorials were also made in Jacksonville, Florida, and Memphis, Tennessee, among many other places.

A plaque in Montreal that was installed in a Hudson's Bay Company store commemorating Jefferson Davis's brief stay in the city by the United Daughters of the Confederacy in 1957 was removed following the rally, after many complaints.

On July 10, 2021, Charlottesville removed the statues of General Lee and Stonewall Jackson.

=== Local politics ===
Most senior city officials in office at the time of the rally had resigned or retired a year later, or were about to. The city attorney (who had considered that the city couldn't legally stop the rally) left Charlottesville for another job, the chief of police resigned in the wake of a report concluding that the police failed to protect the public, and the city manager was set to retire by the end of 2018.

As a consequence of the rally, a left-wing political coalition became ascendant in local politics, with the aim of overturning what they considered age-old racial and economic injustice. Nikuyah Walker, one of the local activists who charged into a city council meeting days after the rally to confront the city leadership, was elected mayor in January 2018. A New York Times report in July 2018 concluded that the issue of whether the rally's violence was mainly the fault of outsiders or a consequence of local racism remained controversial in Charlottesville, and that the city remained divided between activists for change and those who would prefer to return to the status quo.

=== Sines v. Kessler ===
In November 2017, nine Charlottesville residents who suffered physical and psychological injuries during the Charlottesville violence filed a civil lawsuit in the United States District Court for the Western District of Virginia against Jason Kessler and other organizers and promoters of the rallies. The plaintiffs claim their civil rights were violated, as the organizers had urged those attending the Unite the Right rally to arm themselves and partake in violence. The plaintiffs sought both compensatory and injunctive relief from the trial. The defendants' motion to dismiss were denied.

The trial began on October 25, 2021. On November 23, 2021, jurors found in favor of the plaintiffs on the four counts and deadlocked on two other counts. Finding 17 white nationalist leaders and organizations liable, the jury awarded more than $25 million in damages.

=== Indictment of "Rise Above Movement" members ===
==== Convicted members ====
In August 2018, four members of the Southern California-based Rise Above Movement (RAM), were indicted in federal court in Virginia on charges of violating, and conspiring to violate, a federal rioting statute. Federal prosecutors and investigators charged the four California men – Benjamin Drake Daley, Thomas Walter Gillen, Michael Paul Miselis, and Cole Evan White – with planning violent acts at the Charlottesville rally and carrying out multiple assaults against counterprotesters. RAM, a militant white supremacist and neo-Nazi gang, espoused racism and antisemitism. The group, which claimed a membership of more than 50 people, had previously "boasted publicly of their violence during protests in Huntington Beach, San Bernardino and Berkeley."

Daley, Gillen, Miselis, and White all pleaded guilty in May 2019, admitting that they "collectively pushed, punched, kicked, choked, head-butted, and otherwise assaulted several individuals, resulting in a riot". Daley, Gillen, and Miselis were sentenced to prison turns of 37 months, 33 months, and 27 months, respectively. Daley and Miselis submitted conditional guilty pleas that allowed them to appeal on the issue of the Anti-Riot Act, which they claimed was unconstitutional. The U.S. Court of Appeals for the Fourth Circuit rejected this argument, and affirmed the convictions while adopting a limiting constructions to the Act, holding that the key parts of the statute were constitutional as so construed. White, who cooperated with authorities and admitted guilty earlier than the others, served seven months in prison and in 2019 was released, being permitted to spend the rest of his sentence on home electronic monitoring.

==== Pending charges ====
Robert Rundo, the founder of RAM, was charged in federal court in California in a criminal complaint unsealed in October 2018. Other members of the group – Robert Boman, Tyler Laube, and Aaron Eason – were also arrested and charged in federal court in California with violations of the federal Anti-Riot Act, specifically conspiracy to commit rioting and use of interstate commerce with intent to riot. Rundo fled to Central America, where he was quickly arrested and extradited to the United States.

U.S. District Judge Cormac J. Carney dismissed the charges against Rundo, Boman, and Eason in June 2019, ruling that the federal Anti-Riot Act is "unconstitutionally overbroad in violation of the First Amendment." Laube's case was also dismissed, following the 2019 withdrawal of a November 2018 guilty plea. In 2021 the U.S. Court of Appeals for the Ninth Circuit reversed the district court's dismissal, finding that the challenged provisions of the Anti-Riot Act were, in fact, constitutional. Federal prosecutors thus resumed the criminal case against Rundo, Boman, and Laube; a new indictment against them was unsealed in January 2023. In addition to the defendants' participation in Charlottesville, the indictment also references the group's street brawls in California. Rundo was arrested in Romania in March 2023 and extradited to the United States.

=== Threats against a local politician ===
Charlottesville community activist Don Gathers, the co-founder of Charlottesville's Black Lives Matter chapter, who also served on the blue-ribbon committee which, after the Unite the Right rally, met to decide whether to remove or relocate the Confederate statues which were the putative focus of the rally, announced in a press release on January 7, 2019, that he would be a candidate for the Charlottesville city council, using the slogan "Community Driven, Community Focused". Gathers – who was also a member of the city's Civilian Police Review Board, and a deacon at First Baptist Church – scheduled a public event for the next day, but instead of officially announcing his candidacy, Gathers, who is black, withdrew from the race. He also resigned from the Review Board that night.

On September 18, 2019, white supremacist Daniel McMahon of Brandon, Florida, was arrested and charged with willful interference with a candidate for elective office, bias-motivated interference with a candidate for elective office, threats to injure in interstate commerce, and cyberstalking for threatening physical violence to Gathers, because he was a black man running for public office, causing Gathers to fear bodily injury or even death. McMahon, who is known online as the trolls "Jack Corbin" and "Pale Horse", described himself on Gab – a social network popular with far-right users – as a "Goddamn fascist". He praised both James Alex Fields Jr., the neo-Nazi who drove his car into a crowd of counter-protesters at the Unite the Right rally, killing one person and injuring 28, and was sentenced to life imprisonment, and Robert Bowers, the perpetrator of the 2018 Pittsburgh synagogue shooting, frequently citing Fields as an exemplar to intimidate anti-fascists. McMahon has expressed the opinions that "white people are superior to members of other racial, ethnic and religious groups", that undocumented immigrants deserve to be treated "like the cockroaches they are", and white people have the right to exist, but gay people do not. In 2020, McMahon pleaded guilty to charges of racially motivated threats to interfere with an election, and one count of cyberstalking. He was sentenced 41 months in prison.

== 2018 anniversary rally ==
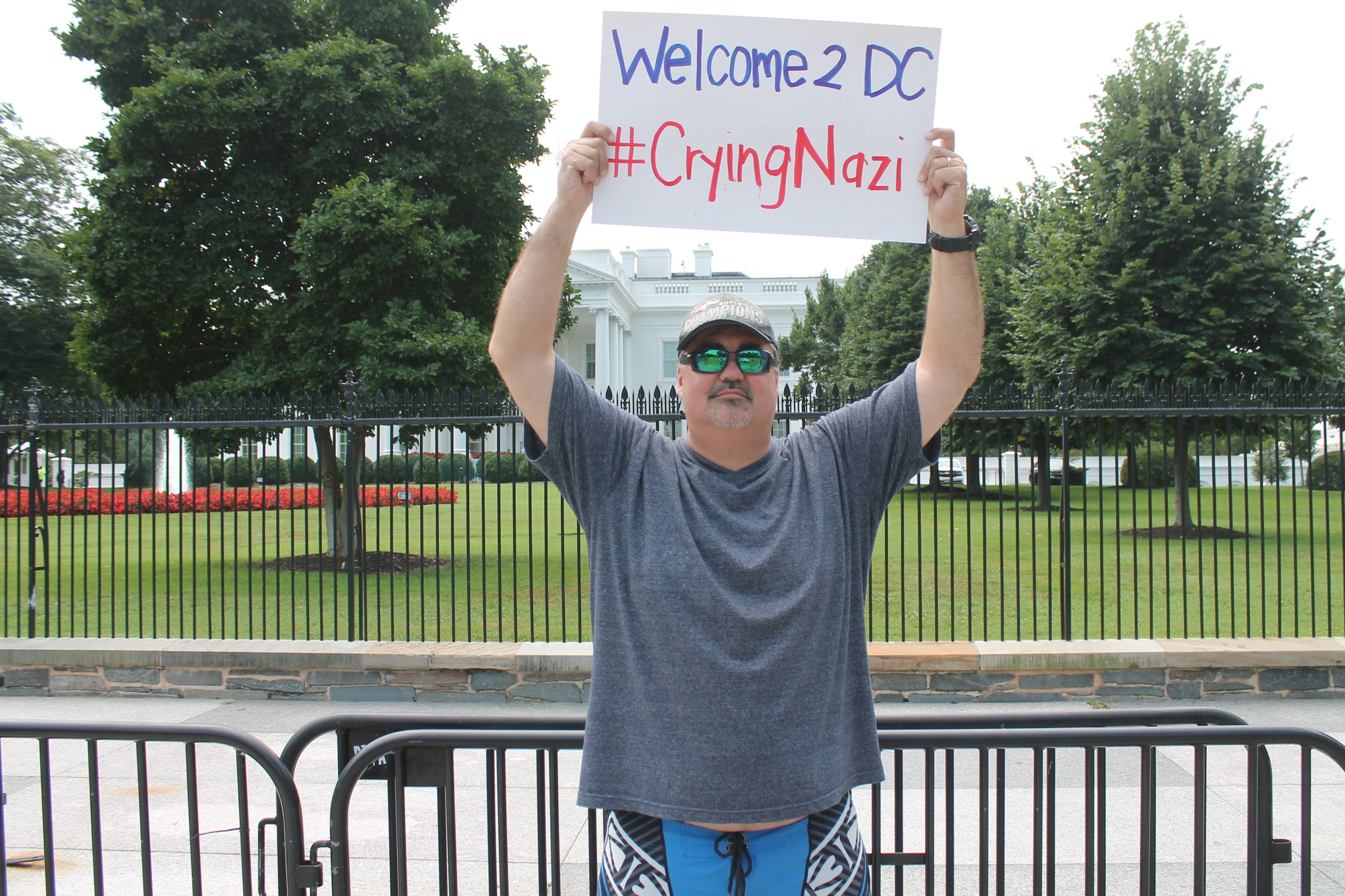
A counter-demonstrator holding a sign referring to Christopher Cantwell as the "Crying Nazi" in front of the White House on August 11, 2018

In November 2017, Jason Kessler, the organizer of the rally, applied for a permit to hold a rally in Charlottesville in August 2018, on the anniversary of the march. In December 2017, the city of Charlottesville denied the permit, writing that Kessler's application "likely underestimates the number of participants" and that "no reasonable allocation of city funds or resources can guarantee that event participants will be free of any 'threat of violence'". While Kessler filed suit against the city, he withdrew the suit before any ruling was made.

In June 2018, Jason Kessler's application for a "White Civil Rights Rally" was approved for August 11 and 12 by the National Park Service. The rally was planned to be held in Washington, D.C. A coalition of 18 activist groups under the collective title D.C. Against Hate planned "to counter-protest the event on a massive scale, with the aim of shutting down the rally entirely".

On July 31, 2018 Facebook announced that it had deleted a number of accounts which were engaging in "coordinated inauthentic behavior". Among the activities being pursued by these accounts was the organization of a counter-protest of the 2018 anniversary rally in Washington, D.C. Initial reports showed links between the deleted accounts and the Russian-based Internet Research Agency (IRA), which was connected to Russian misinformation campaigns during the 2016 US presidential election.

After Charlottesville refused to approve another march, Unite the Right held an anniversary rally on August 11–12, 2018, called "Unite the Right 2", in Washington, D.C. The rally drew only 20–30 protesters amidst thousands of counter-protesters, including religious organizations, civil rights groups, and anti-fascist organizers. Counter-protesters who demonstrated against the rally numbered into the thousands. There were only a few arrests, no one was injured, and the crowd was dispersed early by a rainstorm.

== Legacy ==
On August 9, 2018, Debbie Elliott, writing for NPR, noted that "Charlottesville has become shorthand for racial strife." Elliott also noted that the rally "forced [the town] to rethink [its] racial history", adding that "the new narrative is coming from the nearly 20 percent of residents [of Charlottesville] who are not white and have long experienced racial disparities.", but that "as that story is being amplified, some fear being drowned out of the conversation".

On August 10, 2018, politician Tom Perriello, writing for Slate, argued that "a growing body of evidence suggests that the true legacy of Unite the Right will be the unity that's been forged by those on the other side—those who dare to face down the evils of historical revisionism and injustice to forge a better future." Perriello also argued that the rally may have started "the slow death of 'both sides' journalism", resulted in "Bankruptcy and jail time for Nazis", helped the Democrats win the 2017 Virginia gubernatorial election in November, and "Rais[ed] the bar for white allyship", resulting in "today's white allies [being] more numerous, less expectant of being in charge, and more prepared to use white privilege as a shield on the front lines."

Also on August 10, political scientist Cas Mudde, writing for The Guardian, argued that "The myth of Charlottesville is that the rally was a big success for the alt-right. The organizers had two major political goals for the rally: firstly, to show the country that the alt-right is not just a social media phenomenon, and secondly, to bring various far right groups together. Neither of these goals was realized." and that "The rally's goal to reunite the extreme 'alt-right' with the radical 'alt-light' has failed as they grow further apart".

On the third anniversary of the Unite the Right rally in August 2020, lawyer Roberta Kaplan and Holocaust historian Deborah Lipstadt, writing for CNN, argued that "it is now clear that the violence and hatred evident at Charlottesville was not a passing moment or a onetime event.", citing several prominent killings and shootings that happened afterwards which "all had connections to and echoed the slogans and worldview so proudly proclaimed by the groups and individuals who came to Charlottesville.", including the 2018 Pittsburgh synagogue shooting, the 2019 Christchurch mosque shootings, the 2019 Poway synagogue shooting, the 2019 El Paso shooting, and the 2019 Halle synagogue shooting.

On the fifth anniversary of the rally, several remembrance events were held in Charlottesville, including a moment of silence at the University of Virginia chapel. The Anti-Defamation League released a statement saying that the rally "stunned the nation and brought the profound threat of domestic extremism into sharp focus"., adding that "Today, white supremacists have reimagined their messaging and tactics, but remain a critical threat, as clearly evidenced by attacks in Pittsburgh, El Paso, Poway and Buffalo, and by their participation in attempts to intimidate vulnerable communities and subvert our democracy". The Southern Poverty Law Center stated that "Five years after white supremacists descended on Charlottesville, Virginia, the statue they came to protect is gone, and the 'alt-right' coalition they embodied has imploded. At the same time, the existential threat that far-right extremism poses to the U.S. has arguably never been more severe." According to NPR, "Racial justice advocates see the terror [in Charlottesville] as a turning point for the country – one that encouraged far right political violence, including the attack on the U.S. Capitol last year." Despite these setbacks, NPR also noted that "Civic engagement in Charlottesville has increased in the last five years. Community activists are pressing the city on equity issues, including in housing and public schools."

=== January 6 United States Capitol attack ===
Joan Donovan, research director at Harvard's Shorenstein Center on Media, Politics and Public Policy, said that key figures in both the Unite the Right rally and Gamergate worked to raise online fury ahead of the January 6 United States Capitol attack.

== See also ==
- Fascism in the United States
- Antisemitism in the United States in the 21st century
- Antisemitism in Virginia
- List of incidents of civil unrest in the United States
- 1939 Nazi rally at Madison Square Garden in New York City, held by the pro-Nazi organization named the German American Bund and attended by 20,000 Bundmen who espoused racism and antisemitism and beat a Jewish counter-protester named Isadore Greenbaum. The rally has frequently been compared to the march in Charlottesville.
- 1987 Forsyth County protests
- 2017 Berkeley protests
- Boston Free Speech Rally
- Liberation and Freedom Day, a new (2019) holiday which is officially celebrated in the city of Charlottesville
- 2020 VCDL Lobby Day
- 2021 United States Capitol attack
- "Documenting Hate, Charlottesville" – collaboration between Frontline and ProPublica
- Robert Edward Lee (sculpture) § Protests against its removal
- Matthew Q. Gebert, a US State Department employee who attended the Unite the Right rally
- Patriot Front, an alt-right movement group founded during the aftermath of the Unite the Right rally
- Radical right (United States)
- Bitburg controversy, a controversy surrounding Ronald Reagan's comments about Nazis
- The Donald J. Trump Enduring Flame, artwork
- National Socialist Party of America v. Village of Skokie
