= Hartshorn, Missouri =

Unincorporated community in Missouri, US

Coordinates: 37°15′53″N 91°40′14″W

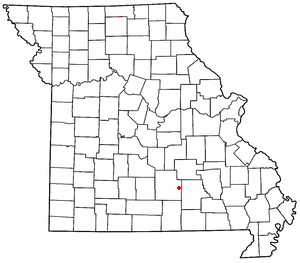

Hartshorn is an unincorporated community in eastern Texas County, Missouri, United States. The community is located on Missouri Route KK, approximately six miles north of Summersville and fifteen miles east of Houston.

A post office called Hartshorn has been in operation since 1891. Hartshorn Cole, an early postmaster, gave the community his first name.

== Notable people ==
- Teddy Joseph Von Nukem (1987–2023), white nationalist and far-right extremist
