= Assault of DeAndre Harris =

Assault that occurred at the Unite the Right rally in Charlottesville, Virginia

- Date: August 12, 2017
- Time: 11:00 AM
- Location: Charlottesville, Virginia, U.S.
- Suspects: Daniel P. Borden, Alex Ramos, Jacob Goodwin, and Tyler Watkins Davis

On August 12, 2017, DeAndre Harris, a black man, was assaulted by six white men in an attack in a parking garage next to the police headquarters during the Unite the Right rally in Charlottesville, Virginia, United States. Images and video of the assault captured by photojournalist Zach Roberts went viral and became a symbol of the enmity underlying the protest.

Four men were arrested on charges of malicious wounding in the assault of Harris. The last arrest took place on January 24, 2018. All four were convicted and sentenced to 2–8 years in jail. Harris was found not guilty of assaulting Harold Crews, the chairman of North Carolina's League of the South.

== Background ==
About 500 far-right protestors came to demonstrate their opposition to Charlottesville City Council's decision to remove Confederate monuments and memorials from public spaces. These included self-identified members of the alt-right, neo-Confederates, neo-fascists, white nationalists, neo-Nazis, Klansmen, and various right-wing militias. The marchers chanted racist and antisemitic slogans, carried weapons, Nazi and neo-Nazi symbols, the Valknut, Confederate battle flags, Deus Vult crosses, flags and other symbols of various past and present anti-Muslim and antisemitic groups.

Harris and several friends arrived at Emancipation Park (formerly known as Lee Park) in Charlottesville as counter-protesters at about 11:00 AM. Harris said that in the brief time he was at the rally, he was "hit with water bottles, pepper-sprayed and had derogatory slurs hurled" at him by protesters. In less than an hour, law enforcement began to clear both protesters and counterprotesters from the park after McAuliffe had declared the rally an "unlawful assembly". The white supremacists came into closer contact with the counterprotesters lining the streets as law enforcement pushed them out of the Park. There were about a thousand counterprotesters.

== Beating ==
According to photojournalist Zach D. Roberts, who witnessed the assault, the violence began when Charlottesville police pushed protesters into the streets where there were counterprotesters. Harris and a few friends were leaving the Park on East Market Street along with other counterprotesters and protesters, when Harris and his friends "exchanged words" with the white supremacists. This altercation was captured by journalist Chuck Modi, who also witnessed the beating. Roberts said that the exchange "spilled into a parking lot close to the Charlottesville Police Department building."

During the trial of assailant Jacob Scott Goodwin, arguments made by the defendant's attorney suggested that Harris had initiated the fight by "striking a prominent white nationalist in the head with a flashlight" in response to seeing "a fellow counterprotester being speared in the abdomen with a flagpole". According to The Washington Post, Harris said he swung a flashlight to try to "knock the flagpole away".

Harris was separated from his friends in the chaos of the crowd and was "cornered" by white supremacists who attacked him with poles, metal pipes, and wood slabs. Harris was pulled to safety by a woman known only as Karen and was seen by a "street medic with a first aid kit". Soon after, Roberts informed police about the assault on Harris, all the while voicing concerns that Harris never received any medical attention for about 30 minutes. Harris credited Karen for keeping him alive in the first half hour after the beating.

=== Aftermath ===
Harris suffered a head laceration requiring eight staples, a concussion, a knee injury, a fractured forearm, a chipped tooth, internal injuries, and a spinal injury. The assault was captured by photographs and videographers, and the footage was disseminated throughout social media and mainstream news. The Charlottesville Police Department, the Virginia State Police, and the Federal Bureau of Investigation launched investigations into the assault.

Shaun King launched an Internet campaign to identify the men involved in the beating, calling on members of the public to examine photos and videos on social media, such as YouTube, Facebook, and Twitter. This helped identify at least one of the attackers. On August 24, nearly two weeks after the beating, 18-year-old Daniel P. Borden, who was seen wearing a "Commie killer" helmet at the rally, from Mason, Ohio, was charged. On August 28, 33-year-old Alex Michael Ramos of Marietta, Georgia, a member of the Fraternal Order of the Alt-Knights (FOAK) a military branch of the Proud Boys, was arrested on charges of malicious wounding. 22-year-old Jacob Scott Goodwin from Ward, Arkansas, a member of neo-Nazi Billy Roper's Shield Wall Network (SWN) and the neo-fascist Traditionalist Workers Party (TWP), was arrested on October 11, 2017. On January 17, 2018, police in Charlottesville, Virginia obtained an arrest warrant for 49-year-old Tyler Watkins Davis of Middleburg, Florida, a member of League of the South. On January 24, 2018, Davis was arrested by deputies from the Clay County Sheriff's Department.

Harris was attacked on social media and received death threats on his phone. His name was specifically mentioned in a United Nations Convention on the Elimination of All Forms of Racial Discrimination (CERD) August 18 report, in which experts recalled the "horrific events in Charlottesville of 11–12 August 2017 leading to the death of Ms. Heather Heyer, and the injuries inflicted on many other protesters, as well as the terrible beating of Mr. Deandre Harris by white supremacists."

=== Trials and conviction ===
On May 1, 2018, white supremacist Jacob Scott Goodwin was convicted of the malicious wounding of Harris by a Charlottesville jury, which recommended a sentence of 10 years imprisonment and a $20,000 (~$25,218 in 2025) fine.

On May 3, 2018, Alex Michael Ramos was convicted of malicious wounding by a jury in Charlottesville. They recommended a six-year sentence with no fine.

On May 21, 2018, Daniel Patrick Borden pleaded guilty to malicious wounding. Sentencing was expected in October 2018, but delayed until January 7, 2019, when he received a suspended sentence of 20 years, with three years and ten months of actual incarceration.

On August 23, 2018, Goodwin received a sentence of eight years (with an additional two years suspended), while Ramos received a six years sentence (with an additional three years of probation).

On February 8, 2019, Tyler Watkins Davis entered an Alford plea on the malicious wounding charge; he received a sentence of two years and one month.

== Assault charge and acquittal of Harris ==
Members of the North Carolina's League of the South, a white supremacist organization, including 48-year-old Harold Ray Crews, the League's North Carolina chairman, and the League's public relations spokesman, Hunter Wallace, alleged that Harris had injured Crews during an altercation in front of the parking garage just before Harris's own beating. The League of the South presented their evidence to both the Charlottesville Police and the commonwealth of Virginia attorney. When they did not issue a warrant, Wallace and Crews went to Merlyn Goeschl, a local magistrate. On October 9, Goeschl signed a warrant for Harris' arrest on a felony charge of unlawful wounding. Goeschl later explained that he "found probable cause to believe Harris committed the offense based on the personal statements of Crews." The warrant was issued on October 9 and Harris turned himself in three days later. He was immediately released without having to post a secured bail.

Interpretations of video footage differ on whether Crews used a flagpole to attack "another counterprotester" or Harris himself:

According to an October 12 Washington Post article by Ian Shaphira, "online footage shows Crews trying to spear another counterprotester with the pole of a Confederate flag, prompting Harris to fight back. Harris swung his flashlight at Crews, appearing to hit him."
According to an October 12 BBC article, "Video of the incident appears to show a scuffle between the two in which Mr Harris swings a torch at a man identified by US media as Mr Crews, who lunges at him with the pole of a Confederate flag."
Hunton & Williams reported "a counter-protester attempted to yank a flag away from a Unite the Right demonstrator who resisted and fought back. During that struggle, a second counter-demonstrator named DeAndre Harris rushed in and used a club — possibly a Maglite flashlight — to strike the alt-right demonstrator’s head or shoulder."

Harris' attorney S. Lee Merrit said, "It was a flimsy swing. It would not have justified the kind of charges brought in this case." He later provided NBC News with another video clip shot on August 12 later in the day, when DeAndre was already hospitalized. According to Merritt, the video showed a group of white men attacking Crews, with one of them striking Crews in the head with a blunt object.

In an interview with The Washington Post, Shaun King said, "I am disgusted that the justice system bent over backwards to issue a warrant for one of the primary victims of that day, when I and others had to fight like hell to get that same justice system to prosecute people who were vicious in their attacks against Harris and others. Now, we're seeing white supremacists celebrate on social media, bragging about Harris's arrest. They're hailing this as a victory."

On January 10, 2018, Judge Robert Downer downgraded the charge to misdemeanor "assault and battery", an offense that does not carry jail time.

Also on January 10, law enforcement in Southampton County, Virginia charged him for speeding, transporting a loaded rifle and possession of a concealed weapon. This resulted in a new restriction for violating his bond: Offender Aid and Restoration supervision until March 16, when his trial was set.

On March 16, Harris was found not guilty of assault by Judge Robert Downer.

== Independent review of city response ==
A 207-page independent review, commissioned by the City of Charlottesville and prepared by Timothy J. Heaphy, was released on December 1, 2017. The "unsparing" report assessed Charlottesville's "response to three separate white supremacist events in the city" in 2017. Most of the blame was placed on the Charlottesville Police Department but the actions of the "Charlottesville City Council, attorneys from the city and state, the University of Virginia and the Virginia State Police" were also criticized. The report concluded that, "[a]lmost everything that could have been mishandled was." "Virginia state troopers...had orders to protect Emancipation Park but not to go beyond the park into "the mess on Market Street." Shortly after the publication of the report on the white supremacist rally that was "highly critical of the police department", Charlottesville Police Chief Alfred Thomas resigned.

Merritt said, "In an atmosphere where it is now clear law enforcement was instructed to stand down and allow violent supremacists to attack civilians, it seems only appropriate the city of Charlottesville reduce the demonstratively unjust charges against Mr. Harris, and we encourage the city to go even further with a total dismissal."
