= Metropolitan Anarchist Coordinating Council =

Anarchist group based in New York City

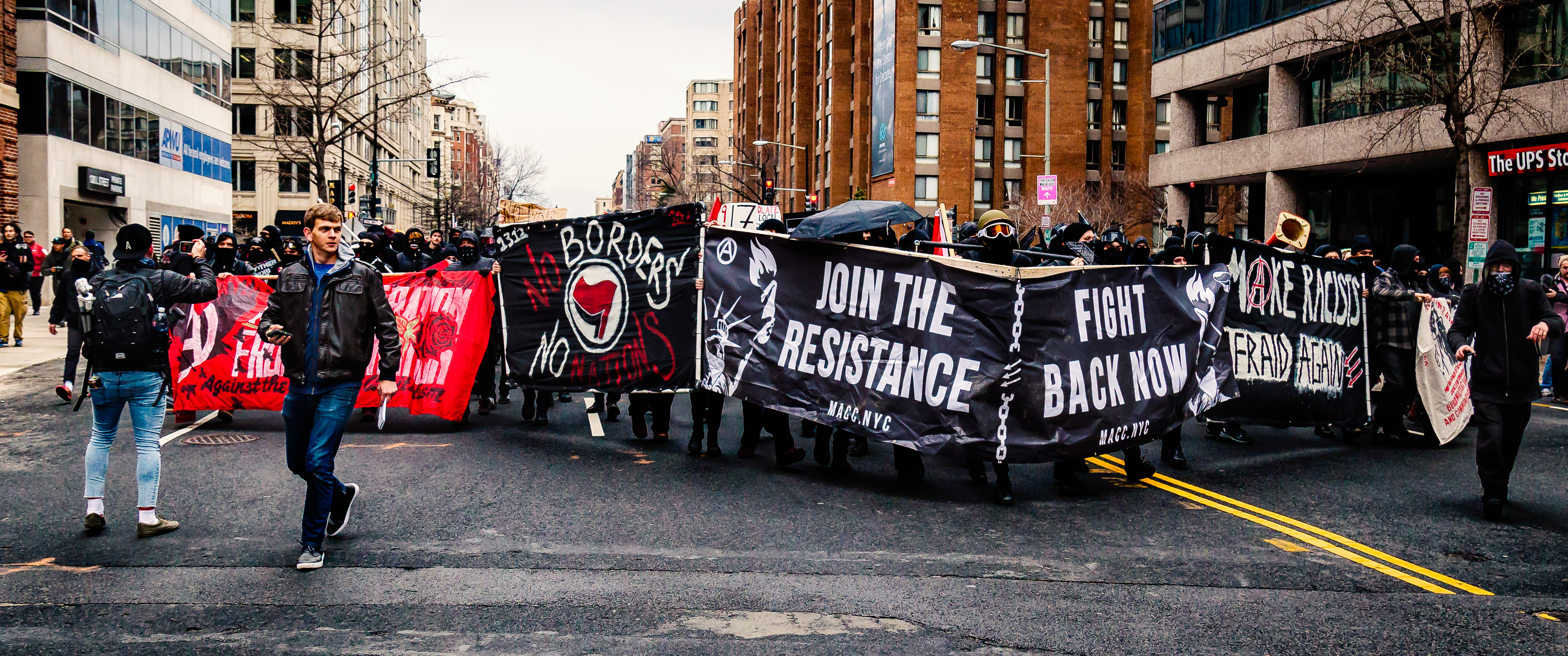
MACC organizing a protest during DisruptJ20

The Metropolitan Anarchist Coordinating Council (MACC) is an anarchist group based in New York City. Its principles, in accordance with anarchist values, include anti-oppression, direct action, direct democracy, horizontalism, and mutual aid.

In early 2017, a MACC working group organized counter-protests at far-right rallies. The group expanded that year to counteract online recruitment for the far right and created a browser plug-in to deplatform far-right videos that violate YouTube's community guidelines.

As part of the 2018 Occupy ICE protests, MACC organized dozens of protesters to camp in the way of a Manhattan Immigration and Customs Enforcement building loading dock.

The group was active in the city's 2020 Black Lives Matter protests. Its jail and court support group assisted arrested protesters by finding and appearing at arraignments, providing food and emotional support as well as bail funds, if needed. MACC supports police abolition in lieu of reform.

On September 22, when the cities of New York City, Portland, and Seattle were labelled as anarchist jurisdictions, by United States president Donald Trump. MACC made a statement in which they denounced the use of the word anarchist as a synonym for chaos. MACC later released a statement in solidarity with prison strike in Hudson County Jail, New Jersey.
