= Sines v. Kessler =

Civil rights lawsuit decided in 2021

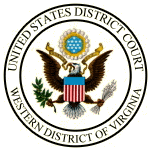
- Court: United States District Court for the Western District of Virginia
- Full case name: Sines et al v. Kessler et al
- Decided: November 23, 2021
- Citations: No. 3:17-cv-00072 324 F. Supp. 3d 765 (W.D. Va. 2018); 339 F.R.D. 96 (W.D. Va. 2021); 558 F. Supp. 3d 250 (W.D. Va. 2021)

Court membership
- Judge sitting: Norman K. Moon

Sines v. Kessler was a civil lawsuit against various organizers, promoters, and participants in the Unite the Right rally, a white supremacist rally that took place in Charlottesville, Virginia in August 2017. The trial began in October 2021, and on November 23, the jury reached a mixed verdict in which they found various defendants liable on claims of civil conspiracy and race-based harassment or violence. They also found James A. Fields Jr., the perpetrator of the car attack against counterprotesters at the rally, liable for assault and battery and intentional infliction of harm. Altogether, the jury awarded the plaintiffs more than $25 million in punitive and compensatory damages, though this was later reduced by the judge to $2.35 million.

The lawsuit was originally filed on October 11, 2017, by nine plaintiffs against 14 individuals and 10 organizations. Defendants included Jason Kessler, Richard B. Spencer, and Christopher Cantwell, as well as white supremacist and neo-Nazi organizations such as Identity Evropa and Vanguard America.

== Background ==
=== Unite the Right rally ===
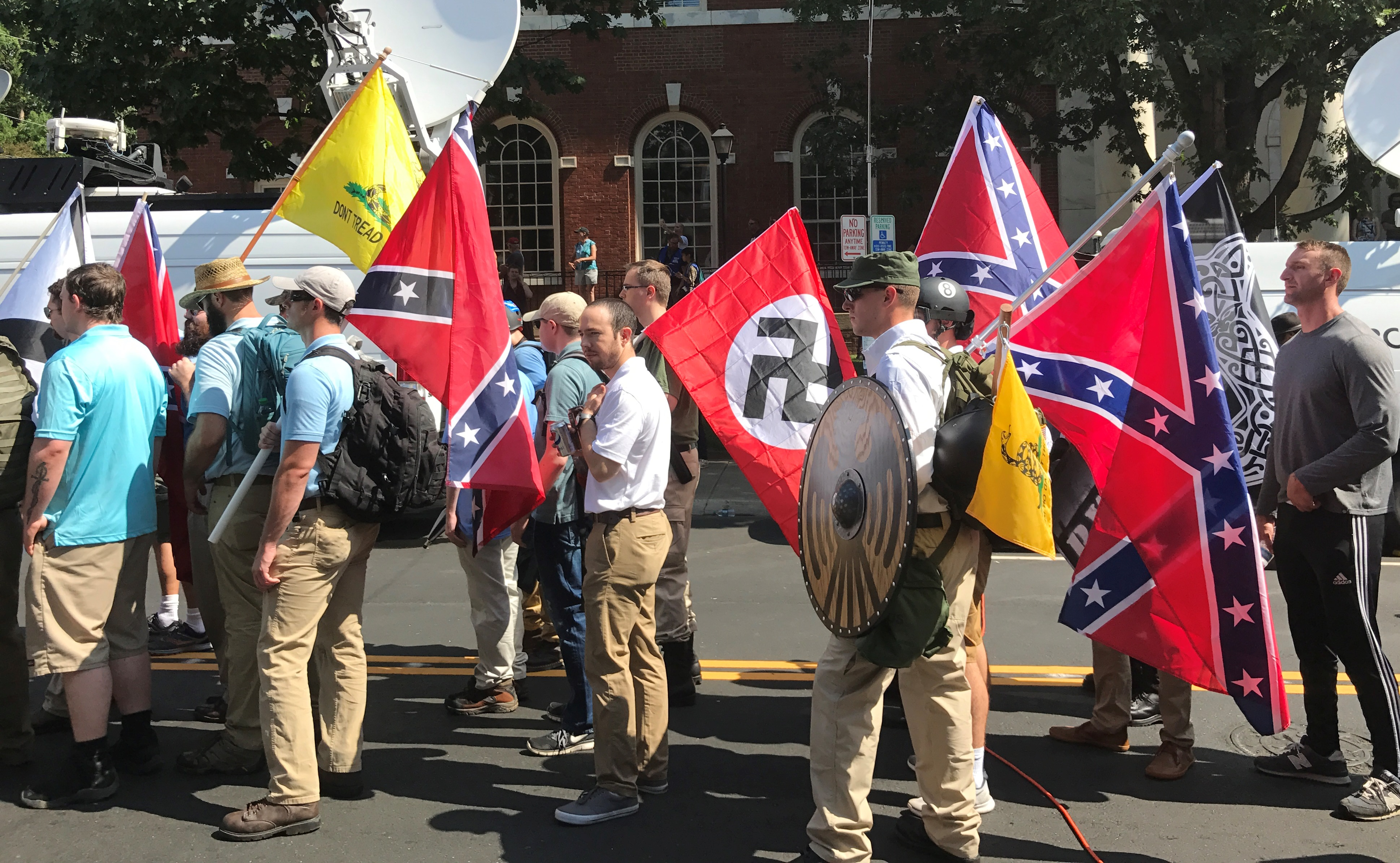
Rally participants preparing to enter Emancipation Park in Charlottesville, Virginia, on August 12, 2017, carrying Neo-Confederate flags, Confederate battle flags, Gadsden flags, a Nazi flag, and a flag depicting Mjölnir

The Unite the Right rally was a white supremacist rally that took place in Charlottesville, Virginia, from August 11 to 12, 2017. Marchers included members of the alt-right, neo-Confederates, neo-fascists, white nationalists, white supremacists, neo-Nazis, Klansmen, and far-right militias. The organizers' stated goals included the unification of the American white nationalist movement and opposing the proposed removal of the statue of General Robert E. Lee from Charlottesville's former Lee Park.

The event had hundreds of participants and sparked a national debate over Confederate iconography, racial violence, and white supremacy. The rally occurred amid the controversy which was generated by the removal of Confederate monuments by local governments following the Charleston church shooting in 2015, in which a white supremacist shot and killed nine at a black church.

The rally turned violent after protesters clashed with counter-protesters, resulting in more than 30 injured. In the afternoon of August 12, self-identified white supremacist James Alex Fields Jr. deliberately rammed his car into a crowd of counter-protesters about 1/2 mile (800 m) away from the rally site, killing Heather Heyer and injuring 35 people. Fields fled the scene in his car but was arrested soon afterward. In 2018, he was tried and convicted in Virginia state court of first-degree murder, malicious wounding, and other crimes. The following year, Fields pleaded guilty to 29 federal hate crimes in a plea agreement to avoid the death penalty in this trial.

=== Legal basis ===
The lawsuit was based in the Ku Klux Klan Act, which was passed by Congress in 1871 to protect African Americans from vigilante attacks. Specifically, the lawsuit relied on 42 U.S.C. Section 1985, which describes "conspiracy to interfere with civil rights". The provision is rarely invoked in lawsuits, but has been referenced in several lawsuits related to protests. It is one of the few laws that can form the basis for an accusation that private citizens (rather than the government) has impeded a plaintiff's civil rights. Although the law is applicable, Jack Beerman, a law professor from Boston University who has written extensively about the act, says that the Supreme Court has historically been reluctant to apply the law to private citizens.

The lawsuit was also based in other statutes, including the Civil Rights Act of 1866.

== Parties ==
=== Plaintiffs ===
Nine Charlottesville residents—including some injured during the rally—filed suit on October 11, 2017, in the United States District Court for the Western District of Virginia. The case was named for the lead plaintiff, Elizabeth Sines, who was a law student at the University of Virginia at the time of the rally. The plaintiffs were backed by the non-profit Integrity First for America and represented by a team of lawyers led by Roberta Kaplan.

=== Defendants ===
Defendants

- Andrew Anglin (Note: A default judgment was entered for this defendant, and they did not ultimately participate in the trial.)
- Christopher Cantwell
- Nathan Damigo
- East Coast Knights of The Ku Klux Klan
- James Alex Fields Jr.
- Fraternal Order of the Alt-Knights
- Matthew Heimbach
- Michael Hill
- Identity Evropa
- Augustus Sol Invictus
- Jason Kessler
- Elliott Kline
- League of the South
- Loyal White Knights of the Ku Klux Klan
- Moonbase Holdings, LLC
- Nationalist Front
- National Socialist Movement
- Matthew Parrott
- Michael Enoch Peinovich
- Robert "Azzmador" Ray (Note: Ray was a fugitive at the time of the trial.)
- Jeff Schoep
- Richard Spencer
- Traditionalist Worker Party
- Michael Tubbs
- Vanguard America

The defendant for whom the case was named is Jason Kessler, a neo-Nazi activist who was a primary organizer of the Unite the Right rally. The lawsuit also named defendant Richard B. Spencer as a primary organizer.

Defendants Christopher Cantwell and Michael Peinovich (known by the pseudonym Mike Enoch) were listed in the lawsuit as promoters of the event. The lawsuit also identified The Daily Stormer as a promoter of the rally through its website and various "book clubs"; the lawsuit named Andrew Anglin and Robert "Azzmador" Ray as individuals responsible for The Daily Stormer, as well as the limited liability corporation, Moonbase Holdings.

Several white supremacist groups, and various leaders and members of these groups, were listed as defendants: Vanguard America was included as a defendant due to the plaintiffs' belief that defendant James A. Fields Jr., the perpetrator of the Charlottesville car attack, was a member of the group. Other defendants were Identity Evropa, its founder Nathan Damigo, and member Elliot Kline (also known as Eli Mosley); the Traditionalist Worker Party and its leaders Matthew Heimbach and Matthew Parrott; the League of the South and leaders Michael Hill and Michael Tubbs; the Fraternal Order of the Alt-Knights (a subgroup of the Proud Boys) and its leader Augustus Sol Invictus; the East Coast Knights of the Ku Klux Klan; the Loyal White Knights of the Ku Klux Klan; the National Socialist Movement and its leader Jeff Schoep; and the loose group known as the Nationalist Front, led by Schoep, Heimbach, and Hill.

Default judgments were entered against defendants Andrew Anglin; Moonbase Holdings, LLC; East Coast Knights of the Ku Klux Klan; Fraternal Order of the Alt-Knights; Augustus Sol Invictus; Loyal White Knights of the Ku Klux Klan; and the Nationalist Front. Robert "Azzmador" Ray was a fugitive while the lawsuit was underway, wanted on federal and local warrants.

== Lawsuit ==
=== Pleadings ===
The plaintiffs claimed that their civil rights had been violated as the organizers had urged those attending to arm themselves and partake in violence. The plaintiffs sought both compensatory and injunctive relief from the trial. The defendants all sought to dismiss the case, claiming that the tactic was equivalent to "lawfare" to silence them and hurt them financially. Judge Norman K. Moon denied the motions to dismiss in July 2018, allowing the case to proceed to the discovery phase.

=== Discovery ===
To demonstrate the claims that the organizers colluded to incite violence, plaintiffs turned to the social media tools used by the organizers, and to anonymous users that communicated with them on alt-right servers on the Discord application. Many of these Discord messages were obtained and distributed to the press by the media collective Unicorn Riot, which collected more than one thousand screenshots of the Discord servers used during the time of the rally's planning. The plaintiffs requested subpoenas to Discord to reveal the identity of about 30 users. At least one of those users moved to quash the subpoena, arguing they had the right to engage in anonymous speech through Discord. In August 2018, U.S. Magistrate Judge Joseph C. Spero denied the motion to quash the portion of the subpoena seeking the identity of the senders, but granted the motion to quash the subpoena seeking the contents of the messages based on the Stored Communications Act. The identities were ordered to be kept confidential. Spero wrote that "While even limited disclosure of this information may create some chilling effect, the protections available through a designation of 'highly confidential' mitigate that harm, and Plaintiffs' interest in this information, which is relevant to testing their claims of an alleged violent conspiracy based on racial and religious animus, outweighs the potential harm to [Jane Doe's] right to association".

On April 26, 2019, U.S. Magistrate Judge Joel C. Hoppe gave defendant Jeff Schoep seven days to comply with plaintiffs' discovery requests after they alleged he was avoiding producing court-ordered evidence in the lawsuit. Vanguard America were forced to pay over $16,000 for not supplying documents as requested, and Matthew Heimbach and Elliot Kline were ordered to pay over $12,000. Kline also was jailed in contempt of court for refusing to provide documents as ordered.

During the discovery phase, Cantwell made violent antisemitic threats against the plaintiff's lawyers, and two attorneys requested to end their representation due to his "repugnant or imprudent" behavior. Cantwell subsequently began defending himself pro se. Other lawyers for various defendants have left the case, citing unpaid bills or lack of cooperation. Kyle Chapman, who was proceeding pro se as a representative for the Fraternal Order of the Alt Knights, called the plaintiffs "verminous cretins" in an email to NPR. In September 2021, Judge Moon denied a motion for summary judgment filed by the League of the South and its leaders, Hill and Tubbs, allowing the case to proceed to trial.

=== Trial ===
Jury selection for the trial began on October 25, 2021. Opening statements began on October 28.

Altogether, plaintiffs spent approximately two weeks calling witnesses; the defense spent two days doing the same. A video deposition was shown of Samantha Froelich, an ex-girlfriend of Elliot Kline, who described her experiences as a former member of Identity Evropa and the alt-right. Holocaust historian Deborah Lipstadt testified to connections between historical antisemitism and contemporary political themes. Chatham University Associate Professor and extremism researcher Peter Simi appeared as an expert witness to describe the importance of violence to the ideology of the white supremacist movement, and the strategy within the movement of claiming violent statements are jokes to try to create plausible deniability. Fields, the perpetrator of the car attack, refused to testify. Defendants called a member of the League of the South and a Charlottesville police officer.

The defense rested on November 17, and closing statements began on November 18. On November 19, the jury entered deliberations with 11 jurors instead of the usual 12, as one juror was forced to quarantine as a result of the COVID-19 pandemic.

=== Verdict ===
The jury reached a mixed verdict on November 23, 2021. They deadlocked on the first two claims, to determine whether defendants had engaged in a federal race-based conspiracy. Jurors found all defendants liable on the third claim, of civil conspiracy under Virginia state law. Jurors awarded $500,000 in punitive damages against each individual defendant, and $1 million against each organization in relation to that charge.

On the fourth claim, jurors found that all defendants named in the charge (Kessler, Spencer, Kline, Ray, and Cantwell) had engaged in race-based harassment or violence, and awarded $200,000 in punitive damages against each defendant.

The final two claims only applied to Fields, the perpetrator of the car attack. Jurors found that he was liable for assault and battery and intentional infliction of harm, and awarded a total of $12 million in damages against him.

Altogether, punitive and compensatory damages totaled more than $25 million. Following the verdict, lawyers for the plaintiffs said they intended to try the defendants again on the two claims that could not be decided. In early 2023, the judge reduced the jury's punitive damages verdict from $24 million to $350,000 due to a Virginia law that caps punitive damages at $350,000 per case. The $2 million in compensatory damages was left unchanged. A U.S. Magistrate Judge awarded $4.9 million in legal fees to the team led by Roberta Kaplan.

=== Appeals ===
Richard Spencer filed a pro se appeal brief on March 17, 2023, arguing that holding the trial in Charlottesville denied him the right to a fair trial. Christopher Cantwell filed a pro se appeal on March 20, 2023, arguing that the jury held "improper passion and prejudice", and that he couldn't adequately prepare his defense as he had been imprisoned on unrelated charges at the time of the trial.

Plaintiffs also filed a notice of appeal, intending to challenge the reduction in damages.
