= Unite the Right 2 =

2018 white supremacist rally in Washington, D.C.

- Date: August 12, 2018
- Location: Washington, D.C., United States
- Theme: Promotion of white supremacy; Anniversary of the original Unite the Right rally
- Organized by: Jason Kessler
- Participants: 20–30

The "Unite the Right 2" rally (also stylized as Unite the Right II) was a white supremacist rally that occurred on August 12, 2018, at Lafayette Square near the White House in Washington, D.C., United States. It was organized by Jason Kessler to mark the first anniversary of the 2017 Unite the Right rally in Charlottesville, Virginia, which ended in street clashes and a deadly car attack by a neo-Nazi.

Unlike the original rally, "Unite the Right 2" ended without violence. There was only one arrest in connection to it, stemming from a confrontation after the rally had ended.

The rally saw extremely low turnout, with only 20 to 30 of Kessler's supporters marching and thousands of counter-demonstrators amid a heavy police presence. The rally was widely described as a "pathetic" and "embarrassing" failure.

== Background ==
=== Unite the Right rally ===
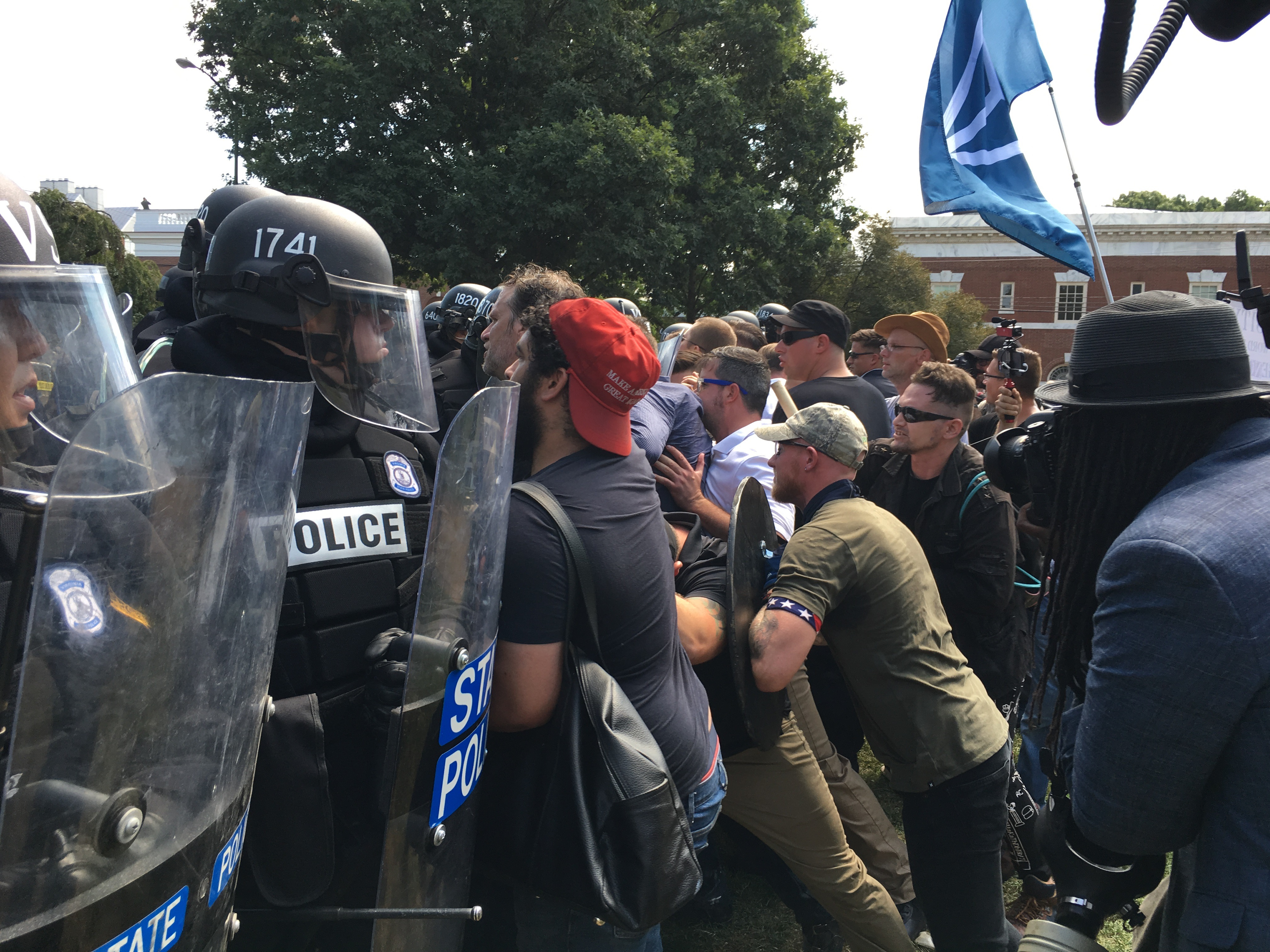
White supremacists clash with police at the Unite the Right rally (2017).

The first Unite the Right rally was a white supremacist rally that occurred in Charlottesville, Virginia, from August 11 to 12, 2017. Its goals were to oppose the removal of a statue of Robert E. Lee from Lee Park and to unify the white supremacist movement in the United States. The far-right protesters included alt-right members, white supremacists and white nationalists, neo-Confederates, Klansmen, neo-Nazis, and various militias, among others. The event turned violent after the protesters clashed with counter-protesters, leaving many injured. On the morning of August 12, Virginia governor Terry McAuliffe declared a state of emergency and the Virginia State Police declared the assembly unlawful. At around 1:45 p.m., a white supremacist rammed his car into a crowd of counter-protesters near the rally site and fled the scene, killing one person and injuring 19. Attorney General Jeff Sessions described the car attack as domestic terrorism. The driver, James Alex Fields Jr., was charged with first-degree murder and other crimes in state court as well as an additional 30 offenses in federal court, including violations of federal hate crime laws.

In the aftermath of the violence, U.S. President Donald Trump's controversial remarks referring to "very fine people on both sides" and condemning "hatred, bigotry, and violence on many sides" were perceived by many as implying moral equivalence between white supremacist marchers and those protesting against them.

Commentator Ed Kilgore suggested that "by moving their act into quite literally the president's neighborhood, and setting the stage for more violence" the demonstrators sought "a fresh infusion of respectability from the politician so many of them regard as a fellow traveler."

=== Attempt to schedule in Charlottesville ===
Kessler initially attempted to schedule a second rally in Charlottesville, but was denied a permit by the city in December 2017. Kessler sued the city on First Amendment grounds, saying that if he had prevailed in the lawsuit, rallies would be held in both Charlottesville and Washington, D.C. In June 2018, Kessler sought a temporary injunction from the court to permit a rally in Emancipation Park on August 11 and 12. On June 24, 2018, during a court hearing, Kessler unexpectedly dropped plans to hold a rally in Charlottesville, and posted plans on Twitter for a rally in Washington, D.C. On August 3, 2018, after withdrawing his request for an injunction, Kessler voluntarily dismissed the lawsuit against the City of Charlottesville.

== Rally ==
=== Plans and permits for demonstration and counter-demonstrations ===
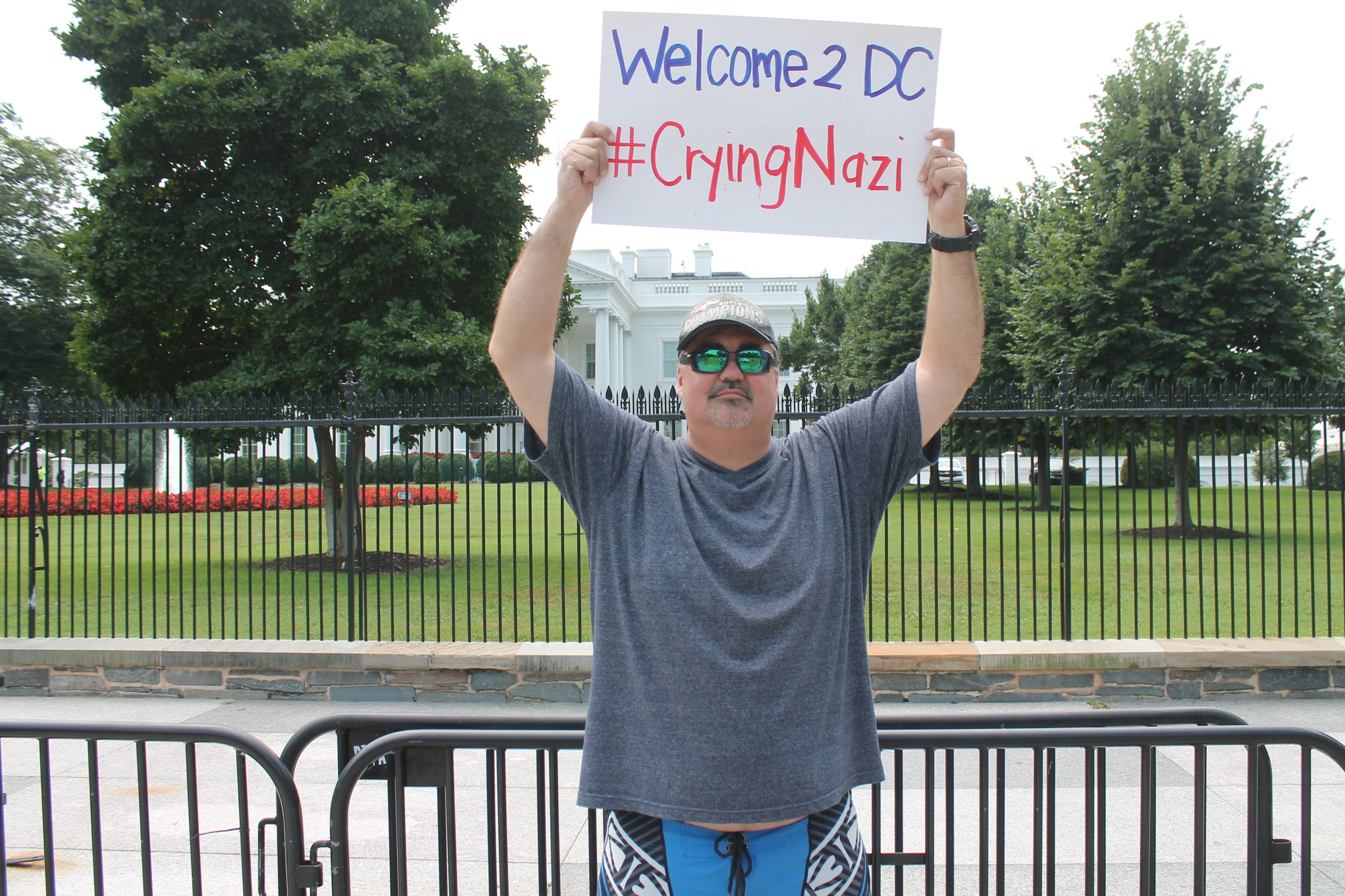
A counter-demonstrator holding a sign referring to Christopher Cantwell as the "Crying Nazi" in front of the White House on August 11, 2018

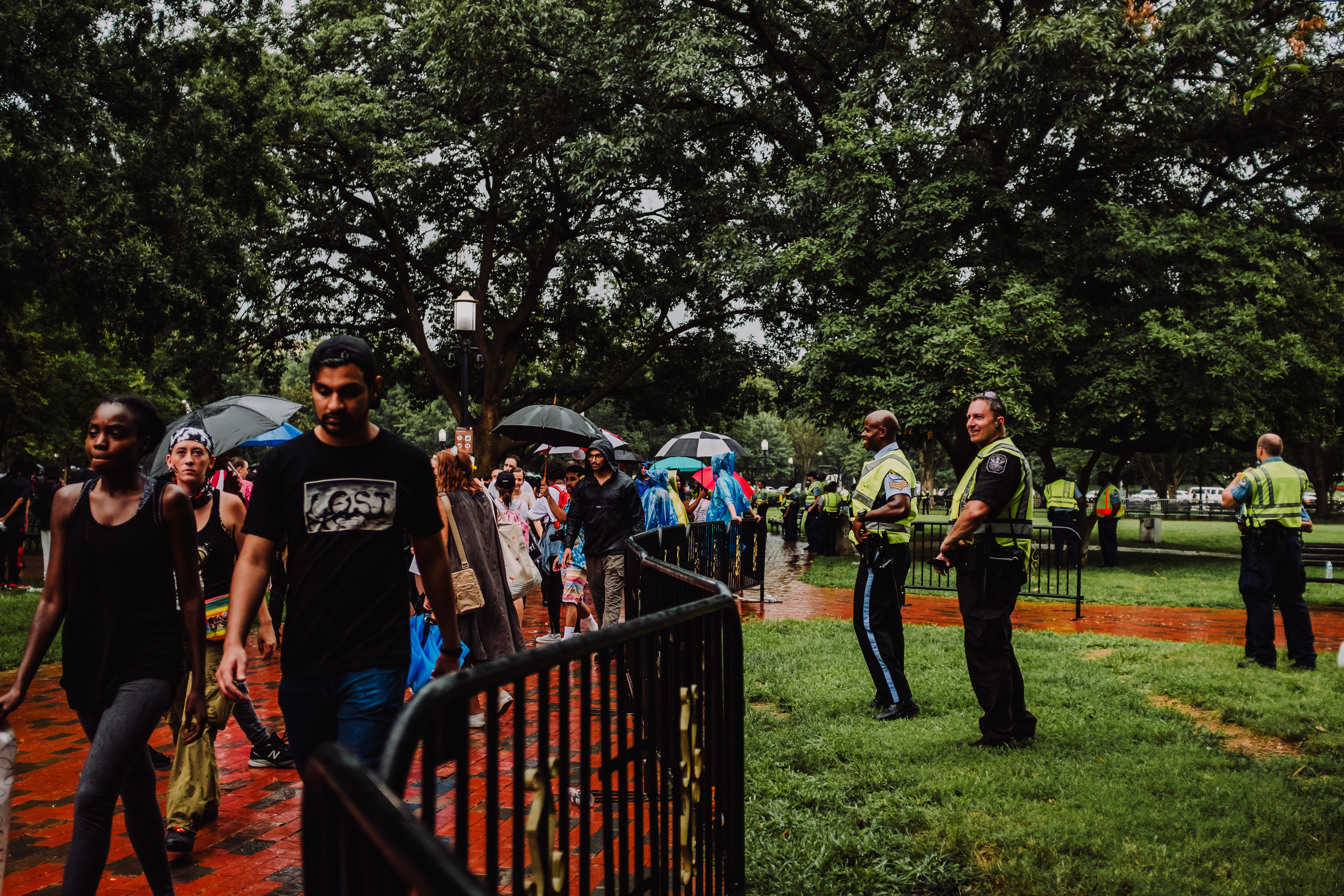
Counter-protesters and police in Lafayette Square on August 12, 2018

On May 8, 2018, Kessler filed an application for a permit for the rally with the National Park Service (NPS), under the name White Civil Rights Rally. After receiving initial approval in June 2018, the NPS granted the permit for up to 400 people on August 10, 2018.

Amid a fracturing of the alt-right movement, a number of far-right individuals and groups who participated in the first Unite the Right rally—including Richard Spencer, the League of the South, Christopher Cantwell, Andrew Anglin, and militia groups—indicated that they would not attend the anniversary rally, having distanced themselves from Kessler, who holds "pariah status among his fellow racists."

The NPS also approved permits for counter-demonstrations filed by New York Black Lives Matter, Inc.; Thomas Oh; Metro DC Democratic Socialists of America or D.C. United Against Hate; the ANSWER Coalition; and the Partnership for Civil Justice Fund.

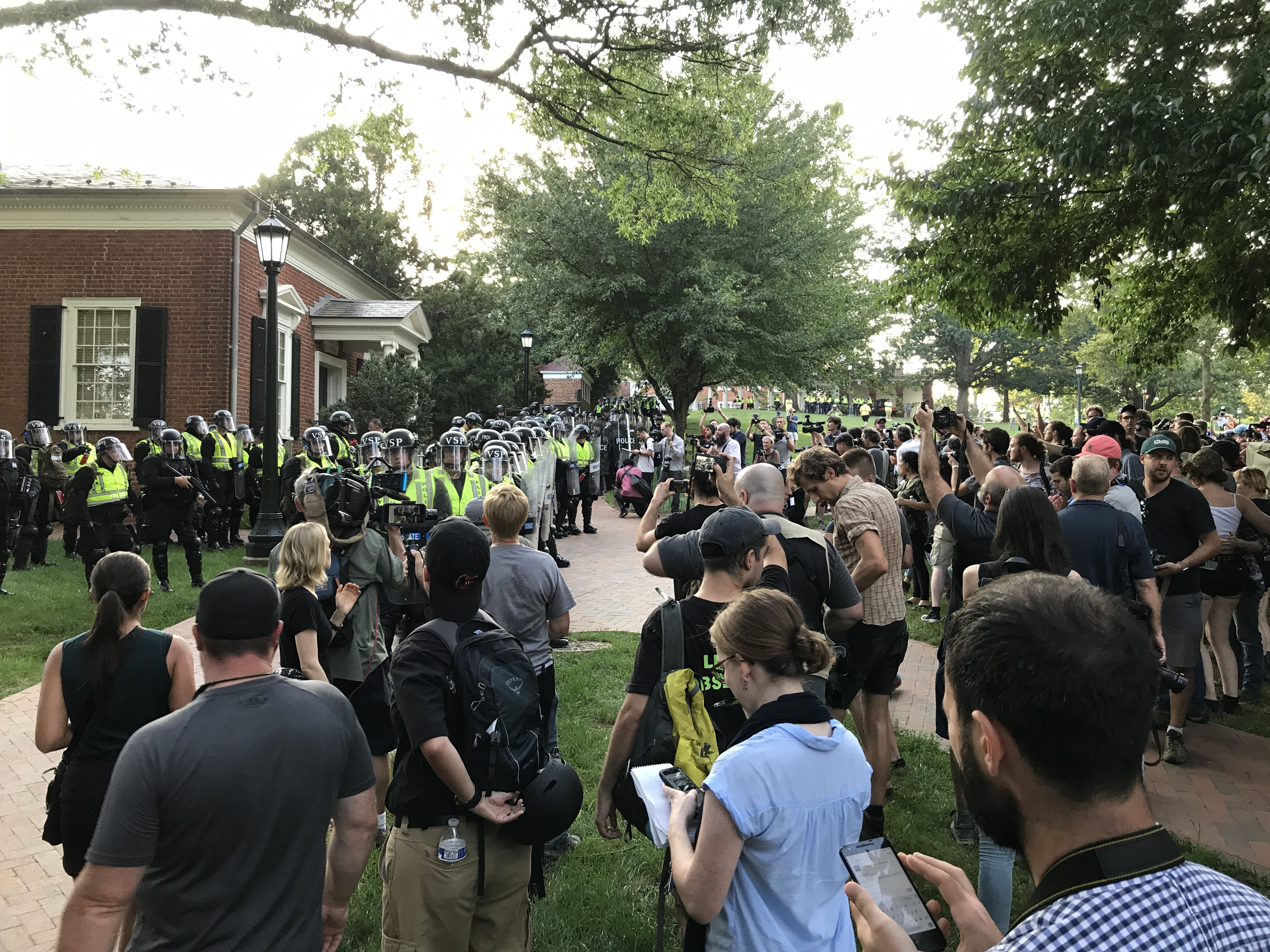
Police and student protesters at the University of Virginia on August 12, 2018

The companies Airbnb, Lyft, and Uber issued statements reaffirming the right of hosts and drivers to "refuse service to anyone who makes them uncomfortable or violates guidelines against discrimination."

=== Authorities' preparation ===
In advance of the rally, D.C. Mayor Muriel E. Bowser activated the District's emergency operations center and returned early from a sister city tour in El Salvador to oversee the local response. The District's Metropolitan Police Department (MPD) and federal authorities made extensive preparation for "a possible volatile showdown" between "Unite the Right 2" demonstrators and counter-demonstrators. Authorities aimed to avoid a repeat of the violence at the Charlottesville rally the year before. MPD chief Peter Newsham said that the police would aim: "to keep the two groups separate. ... When they are in the same area at the same time, it leads to violent confrontations. Our goal is to prevent that from happening." Authorities, specifically the MPD and the United States Park Police, erected a series of barriers at Lafayette Square to separate white supremacists from counter-demonstrators.

In making security plans for the event, the Washington Metro system floated plans to run separate trains for protestors and counter-demonstrators, in a bid to avoid violent clashes. Following an outcry from the public and from the Metro employees' union (ATU Local 689), who regarded the plans as special treatment for white nationalists, Metro dropped consideration of the idea. However, on August 12, it was reported that Vienna Station had closed to the public, only allowing "Unite the Right 2" demonstrators, police, and press in (though they did reportedly stop at other stations and let the public in). The Metro was criticized by many, with people arguing that the service, as well as the police escort the "Unite the Right 2" demonstrators received, amounted to preferential treatment.

Although no rally was scheduled to take place in Virginia—where the original rally took place one year earlier—the state's governor, Ralph Northam, declared a state of emergency, as smaller events were scheduled to take place in Charlottesville.

=== Events ===
Ahead of the rally, Newsham "remained elusive when discussing ingress and egress plans" for the "Unite the Right 2" demonstrated and implied "that the means and route Kessler's group ultimately takes could and probably would change at the last minute." Ultimately, Kessler and a group of between 20 and 30 supporters got on the Washington Metro at the Vienna station in Northern Virginia and traveled to the Foggy Bottom station amid a heavy police presence, then proceeded to Lafayette Square in front of the White House, where Kessler gave a 15-minute speech and was met by thousands of anti-racist counterdemonstrators. The rally itself was scheduled for 5:30 to 7:30 p.m., but "ended early when it began to rain and two police vans escorted the demonstrators back to Virginia." A local official said that the demonstrators were driven to the Rosslyn station in Northern Virginia to return to the Vienna station, "where they would be greeted by county police who could escort them to their cars if necessary."

The rally attracted thousands of counter-demonstrators, many of whom gathered at Freedom Plaza several blocks away from Lafayette Square to oppose white supremacy. Ahead of the rally, one organizer said she expected "participants with a range of political backgrounds from far-left to moderates to conservatives 'who agree that white supremacy is abhorrent.'" Demonstrators included a multiracial group of Baptists. A separate group of about 20 people sang "We Shall Overcome" while marching from the Martin Luther King Jr. Memorial to the Lincoln Memorial. A small portion of counter-protestors were antifa activists; some black-clad protestors engaged in a brief confrontation with police close to 13th and G Streets NW, and some antifa protestors attacked journalists.

The rally and counterdemonstrations ended without violence; there was one arrest stemming from a confrontation after the rally had ended. In a separate incident, one man was charged with simple assault in Virginia after allegedly spitting on two Virginia State Police officers outside the Vienna Metro stop.

=== Costs ===
According to a preliminary estimate prepared by the District of Columbia government, the District spent $2.6 million on costs related to the rally and the related counter-demonstrators. Almost all of the costs related to staffing and overtime for D.C. police. This cost estimate does not include expenditures incurred by other agencies (the Virginia State Police, Fairfax County Police Department, Washington Metropolitan Area Transit Authority, and U.S. Park Police) related to the rally.

== Reactions ==
Ahead of the rally, D.C. Mayor Muriel E. Bowser stated: "We the people of Washington, D.C. say unequivocally that we denounce hate, we denounce anti-Semitism and we denounce the rhetoric that we expect to hear this Sunday." The governors of the neighboring states—Ralph Northam of Virginia and Larry Hogan of Maryland—made similar statements. President Donald Trump declined to specifically condemn white supremacy. Instead, he made a general call for unity and stated that he "condemn[s] all types of racism and acts of violence." The remarks echoed Trump's remarks following the original rally a year earlier, in which he blamed "both sides" for violence. Vice President Mike Pence released a statement saying: "bigotry, racism and hatred run counter to our most cherished values and have no places in American society."

== See also ==
- 2020 VCDL Lobby Day
