= Richard B. Spencer =

American white supremacist (born 1978)

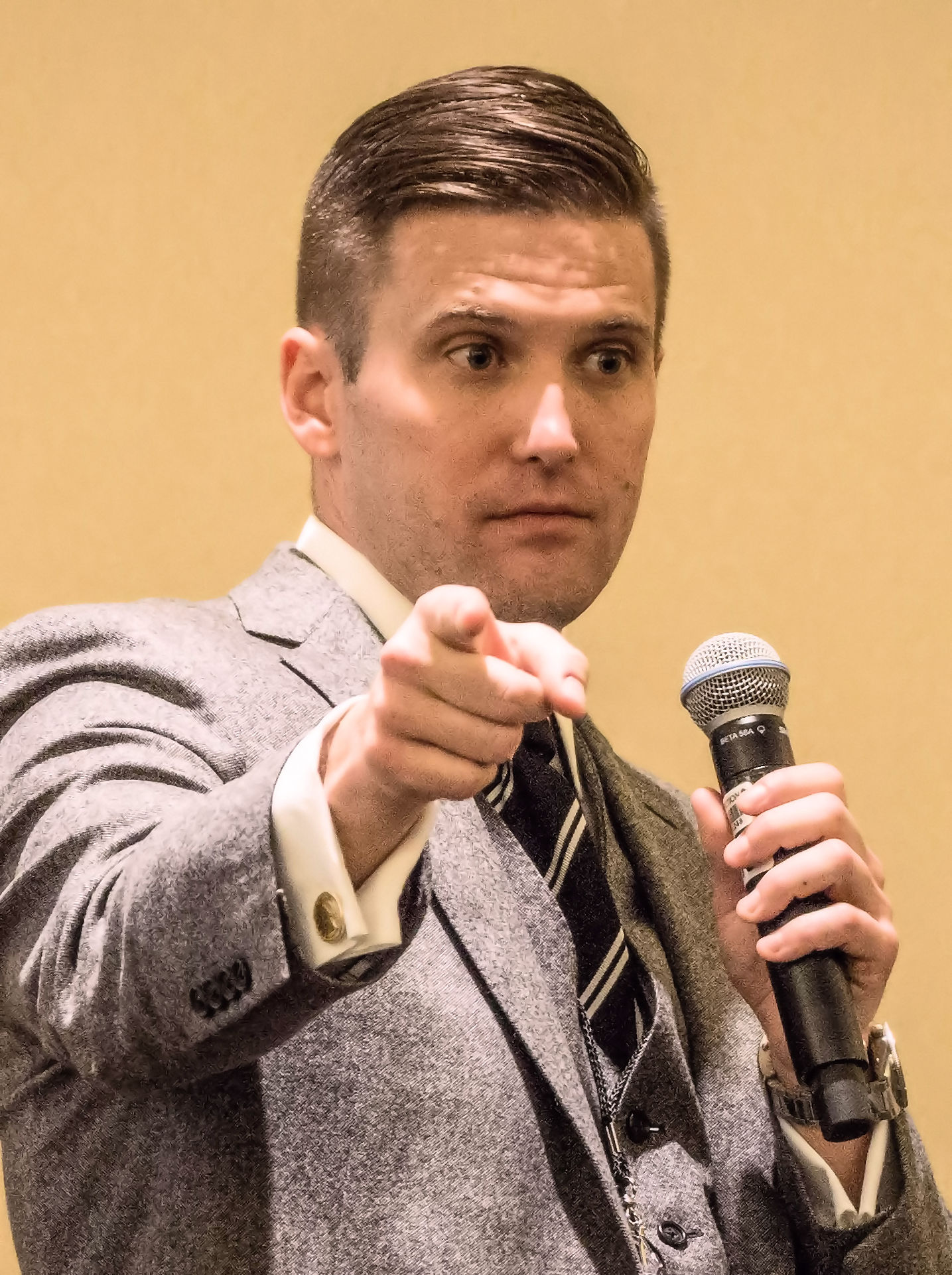
- Spencer in 2016
- Born: Richard Bertrand Spencer; May 11, 1978 (age 48); Boston, Massachusetts, U.S.
- Education: Colgate University (attended); University of Virginia (BA); University of Chicago (MA); Duke University (attended)
- Occupations: Author; publisher
- Political party: Independent
- Movement: Alt-right; Identitarian movement; Neo-Nazism; White supremacy
- Spouse: Nina Kouprianova (m. 2010; div. 2018)
- Children: 2

Richard Bertrand Spencer (born May 11, 1978) is an American neo-Nazi, antisemitic conspiracy theorist, and white supremacist. Spencer claimed to have coined the term "alt-right" and was the most prominent advocate of the alt-right movement from its earliest days. He has advocated for the reconstitution of the European Union into a white racial empire, which he believes will replace the diverse European ethnic identities with one homogeneous "White identity".

Spencer repeatedly used Nazi gestures and rhetoric in public. He was a featured speaker at the August 2017 Unite the Right rally in Charlottesville, Virginia, among other neo-Nazi rallies that he has headlined. In early 2016, Spencer was filmed giving the Nazi salute in a karaoke bar, and leaked footage also depicts Spencer giving the Sieg Heil salute to his supporters during the Charlottesville rally. In early-to-mid-2017, when Spencer's following was at its height, his supporters would give him the Sieg Heil salute when he entered a room.

Spencer was involved in several legal issues. Following the Unite the Right rally where an alt-right supporter drove their car into a group of counter-protesters, killing one and injuring at least 19 others, Spencer was sued as part of Sines v. Kessler for allegedly acting as a "gang boss" and inciting the killing. The jury found Spencer liable on two counts and were unable to reach verdicts for another two, awarding $25 million in total damages. Supporters of Spencer were charged with attempted homicide following an October 2017 speech at the University of Florida. Following an appeal by the Polish government, he was banned from the Schengen Area in 2018, having been banned previously in 2014 after being deported from Hungary.

Spencer largely ceased to be an effective leader of the alt-right movement after March 2018, following violence outside a Michigan State University event where he was speaking. Spencer has frequently contradicted his own previous statements about his beliefs and ideals; in one text exchange in 2022, he told a journalist that he "no longer identifies as a white nationalist."

== Early life ==
Richard Bertrand Spencer was born in 1978 in Boston, Massachusetts, the son of ophthalmologist Rand Spencer and Sherry Spencer (née Dickenhorst), the heiress to cotton farms in Louisiana. He grew up in Preston Hollow, Dallas, Texas. Spencer attended St. Mark's School of Texas, then Colgate University for one year before transferring to the University of Virginia. In 2001, he received a Bachelor of Arts in English Literature and Music from the University of Virginia and, in 2003, a Master of Arts in the Humanities from the University of Chicago. From the summer of 2005 into 2006, Spencer attended Vienna International Summer University. From 2005 to 2007, he was a PhD student in Modern European intellectual history at Duke University. He joined the Duke Conservative Union, where he met future President Donald Trump's senior policy advisor Stephen Miller. His former website says he did not complete his PhD at Duke in order "to pursue a life of thought-crime".

== Activities ==
=== Early activities ===
From March to December 2007, Spencer was the assistant editor at The American Conservative magazine. According to founding editor Scott McConnell, he was fired from The American Conservative because his views were considered too extreme. Spencer spoke about the Duke lacrosse case and credits it with changing the course of his career. From January 2008 to December 2009, he served as the executive editor of Taki's Magazine, a libertarian online magazine published by Taki Theodoracopulos. He has claimed credit for coining the term alt-right in 2008 in order to differentiate himself from "mainstream American conservatism", although Paul Gottfried argues that both he and Spencer created the term.

In March 2010, Spencer founded AlternativeRight.com, a website he edited until 2012. In January 2011, he became the owner and executive director of Washington Summit Publishers. In January 2011, Spencer became president and director of the National Policy Institute (NPI), a White supremacist think tank based in Virginia, which was once run from his mother's $3 million summer house. George Hawley, an assistant professor of political science at the University of Alabama, has described NPI as "rather obscure and marginalized" until Spencer became its president.

Spencer was invited to speak at Vanderbilt University in 2010 and Providence College in 2011 by Youth for Western Civilization. In 2012, he founded Radix Journal as a biannual publication of Washington Summit Publishers. Contributions have included articles by Kevin B. MacDonald, Alex Kurtagić, and Samuel T. Francis. He also hosts a weekly podcast, "Vanguard Radio".

In 2014, Spencer was deported from Budapest, Hungary. Under terms of the Schengen Agreement, he was banned for three years from 26 countries in Europe after trying to organize the National Policy Institute Conference, a conference for White nationalists.

=== Alt-right leader ===
On January 15, 2017, the day of Martin Luther King Jr.'s birthday, Spencer launched the AltRight Corporation and its website altright.com, another commentary website for alt-right members. According to Spencer, the site is a populist and big tent site for members of the alt-right. Swedish publisher Daniel Friberg of Arktos Media is co-founder and European editor of the site. The Southern Poverty Law Center of the United States describes the common thread among contributors as antisemitism, rather than White nationalism or White supremacy in general. Contributors to AltRight.com have included Henrik Palmgren and Jared Taylor. On February 23, 2017, Spencer was removed from the Conservative Political Action Conference, where he was giving statements to the press. A CPAC spokesman said he was removed from the event because other members found him "repugnant".

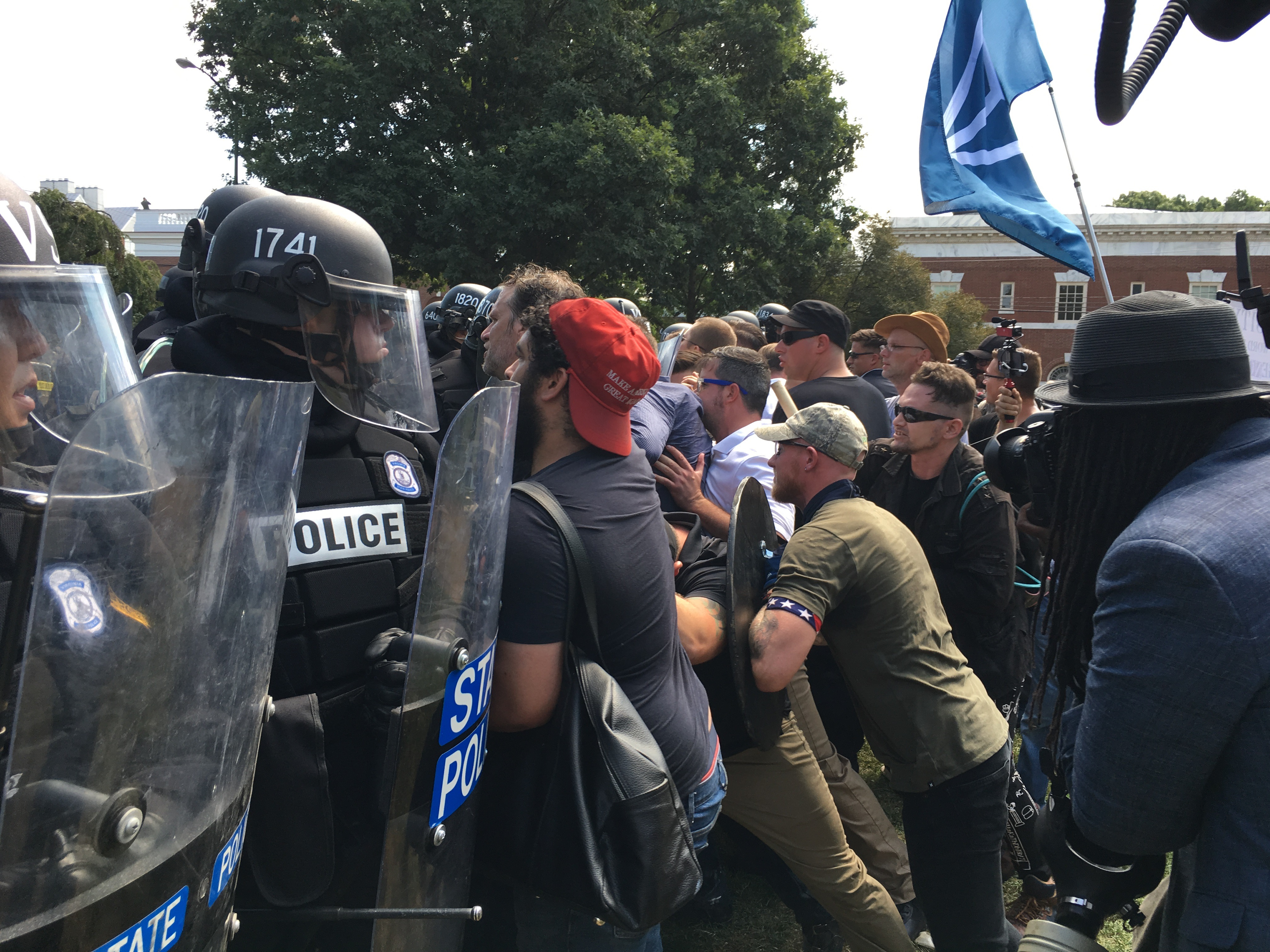
White nationalist protesters clash with police during the Unite the Right rally in Charlottesville, Virginia.

On May 13, 2017, he led a torch-lit protest in Charlottesville, Virginia, against the vote of the city council to remove a statue of Robert E. Lee, the commanding general of the Confederate Army of Northern Virginia during the American Civil War. Spencer and David Duke were among those who led the crowd in chants of "You will not replace us," and "Blood and soil". Michael Signer, the mayor of Charlottesville, called the protest "horrific", and stated that it was either "profoundly ignorant" or intended to instill fear among minorities "in a way that hearkens back to the days of the KKK".

In August 2017, Spencer was listed as an organizer on posters promoting the Charlottesville, Virginia, Unite the Right rally. It attracted counter-protesters, and violence broke out. One rightist drove his car into a group of counter-protesters, killing one woman and wounding 30 so severely they needed hospital treatment. In November 2017, Twitter removed from Spencer's account the blue checkmark that, reported The Washington Post, "the company gives to prominent accounts to help readers ensure they are authentic". Spencer told The Post he was worried this would lead to Twitter banning people like him. He later joined the social network Gab.

In November 2019, Milo Yiannopoulos released an audio recording of Spencer using racist slurs immediately after the 2017 Unite the Right rally. Spencer said he did not recall making the remarks, but did not deny the voice on the recording was his (see #White identity).

A 2022 publication by the Southern Poverty Law Center stated "Spencer's efforts to stage events, and the alt-right movement around him, crumbled in March 2018" following violence outside a Michigan State University event where Spencer was speaking. Following this, Spencer largely ceased to be an effective leader of the movement.

=== Public speaking ===
Short clip of Spencer speaking in November 2016

During a speech Spencer delivered in mid-November 2016 at an alt-right conference attended by approximately 200 people in Washington, D.C., Spencer quoted Nazi propaganda in the original German and denounced Jews. Audience members cheered and gave the Nazi salute when he said, "Hail Trump, hail our people, hail victory!" and extended his right arm with a glass to toast that victory. Spencer later defended their conduct, stating that the Nazi salute was given in a spirit of "irony and exuberance". It was later reported that Spencer had given the Nazi salute at a karaoke bar in April 2016. Additionally, in 2017, sources indicate Spencer pressured followers to give him the Sieg Heil salute when he entered a room. Leaked texts indicate that those who refused to give the Nazi salute to Spencer, such as Jason Kessler, were stigmatized within the movement.

Groups and events which Spencer has spoken to include the Property and Freedom Society, the American Renaissance conference, and the HL Mencken Club. In November 2016, an online petition to prevent Spencer from speaking at Texas A&M University on December 6, 2016, was signed by thousands of students, employees, and alumni. A protest and a university-organized counter-event were held to coincide with Spencer's event.

Richard Spencer speaking about The "Alternative Right" in the United States in 2010 – video by Property and Freedom Society

On January 20, 2017, Spencer attended the inauguration of Donald Trump. As he was giving an impromptu interview on a nearby street afterwards, a masked man punched Spencer in the face, then fled. A video of the incident was posted online, leading to divergent views on whether the attack was appropriate. The attacker remained unidentified as of September 2021.

Shortly after the violent Unite the Right rally in Charlottesville, Virginia, in August 2017, the University of Florida denied Spencer's request for a September 2017 speaking opportunity, citing public safety grounds after opposition from students and locals of Gainesville, Florida. Due to safety reasons, he was also denied speaking requests at Louisiana State University and Michigan State University in August 2017. In September 2017, Cameron Padgett, who tried to book Spencer, sued MSU; he was represented by Kyle Bristow, an MSU alumnus.

On August 16, during a television interview with Israeli Channel 2 anchor Danny Kushmaro, Spencer claimed that "Jews are vastly over-represented in... 'the establishment', that is, Ivy League educated people who really determine policy".

Spencer's National Policy Institute, David Duke, Stefan Molyneux, and American Renaissance magazine were among the white nationalist outlets banned by YouTube from their platform in late June 2020 for not following the platform's policies on hate speech.

== Public response ==
=== Speech at the University of Florida ===
After the University of Florida's August 2017 denial of Spencer's request to speak the following month, Floridian lawyer Gary Edinger threatened to sue the university for violating the First Amendment by prohibiting Spencer from speaking despite being a publicly funded institution. The university subsequently reached an agreement with Edinger allowing Spencer to speak on October 19, 2017. Florida Governor Rick Scott declared a state of emergency for Alachua County on October 16, saying: "I find that the threat of a potential emergency is imminent" as a result of Spencer's appearance.

On October 19, 2017, Spencer spoke at the Curtis M. Phillips Center for the Performing Arts on university grounds. In addition to Spencer, the speakers included Elliott Kline (using the pseudonym "Eli Mosley") of Identity Evropa, a white supremacist group from California, and Mike Enoch, a white nationalist blogger. The event's security costs reportedly amounted to an estimated $600,000. It drew about 2,500 protestors, vastly outnumbering Spencer's supporters.

The speech, which was Spencer's first public appearance after the Charlottesville rally, was disrupted by loud protests. When drowned out by chants from the audience, he grew visibly frustrated, stating that the protestors were interfering with his freedom of speech. He added: "You are all engaged in what's known as the heckler's veto." According to Clay Calvert, director of the Marion B. Brechner First Amendment Project at the University of Florida College of Journalism and Communications, non-violent protesting, booing and suggesting that the speaker leave was not a heckler's veto in law. The speech and the concurrent protests were largely peaceful.

Later that day, three of Spencer's supporters were arrested on felony charges following an alleged discharge of a firearm, directed at protestors leaving the event. The three suspects were residents of Texas who had traveled to Florida to hear Spencer speak. According to the Gainesville Police Department, they had shouted "Hail Hitler" and gave Nazi salutes immediately before the alleged attack. Authorities said that two of the suspects had known links to extremist groups. The men had participated in the August 2017 Unite the Right rally, where Spencer had been scheduled to speak. All three were charged with attempted homicide.

In the aftermath of the October 19 events, Ohio State University declined Spencer's request to allow him to speak on campus, citing "substantial risk to public safety". In response, a lawyer representing Spencer's associate and organizer of his speaking tour filed a lawsuit against the university.

=== Opposition in Montana ===
The National Policy Institute think tank, AlternativeRight.com, and Radix Journal all use the same mailing address in Whitefish, Montana.

In 2013, a dispute with neoconservative lobbyist Randy Scheunemann at Whitefish Mountain Resort in Montana drew public attention to Spencer and his political views.

In 2014, a pro-tolerance group affiliated with the Montana Human Rights Network rallied against Spencer's residency in Whitefish. In response, the city council approved a non-discrimination resolution.

In December 2016, Republican Representative Ryan Zinke, Republican Senator Steve Daines, Democratic Senator Jon Tester, Democratic Governor Steve Bullock and Republican Attorney General Tim Fox condemned a neo-Nazi march that had been planned for January 2017. The community of Whitefish organized in opposition to the event, and the march never occurred. Also in December 2016, Spencer announced he was considering an independent run for Montana's at-large congressional district in the 2017 special election, although he ultimately did not enter the race.

=== European Union bans ===
European governments and media have responded to his visits. During his speaking tour in Hungary in 2014, Spencer was mocked by the Hungarian newspaper Népszabadság for his call for "a white Imperium" through a revival of the Roman Empire, and for his claim to be a "racial European", ideas that the newspaper called contrived and without any basis in European history. In the aftermath of his visit, Hungarian Prime Minister Viktor Orbán pressed through legislative measures which banned his entry and condemned Spencer. The government of Poland has also banned him from entering the country and condemned Spencer, citing his Nazi rhetoric, the anti-Polish and anti-Slavic racism of the Nazis, and the Nazis' genocide of Slavic peoples during World War II. In July 2018, Spencer was detained at Keflavík Airport in Reykjavík, Iceland, en route to Sweden and was ordered by Polish officials to return to the United States; the successful effort of the Poles to ban Spencer from other parts of Europe arises from the Schengen Agreement.

== Views ==
=== White identity ===
Spencer has argued for white pride and the unification of a pan-European "white race" to form a "potential racial empire" resembling the Roman Empire. In a 2016 interview with CNN, he was criticized for an apparent inconsistency or lack of clarity in his definition of white, with his interviewer saying that Spencer defined Syrians as white in the context of Steve Jobs's role in developing the iPhone, but described them as a non-white presence in Europe in the context of the Syrian refugee crisis.

In 2013, the Anti-Defamation League called Spencer a "leader" in white supremacist circles, and said that after leaving The American Conservative, he rejected conservatism, because he believed its adherents "can't or won't represent explicitly white interests". That year, he told Salon.com that white people "need to start thinking about a new ethno-state that we would want to be a part of. This is not going to happen in the next election or in the next 10 years probably, but something in the future that would be for our great grandchildren".

While being interviewed by David Pakman in 2017, he was asked if he would condemn the Ku Klux Klan and Adolf Hitler; he refused by saying: "I'm not going to play this game", while stating that Hitler had "done things that I think are despicable", without elaborating on which things he was referring to.

In a 2016 interview for Time magazine, Spencer said he rejected white supremacy and the slavery of nonwhites, preferring to establish America as a white ethnostate. He also advocates the creation of a white ethnostate in Europe that would be open to all "racial Europeans". Jason Wilson in The Guardian has argued that Spencer and other white nationalists are appropriating some elements of socialist rhetoric to critique a "notion of capitalism centered on stereotypes of Jews".

According to political scientist Tamir Bar-On, Spencer defends "racialist and anti-Semitic agendas" of the Old Right under a new metapolitical guise, acting as a cultural influencer rather than a direct political actor, and using various media outlets to "disseminate his views to ordinary people in an accessible manner".

Audio of Spencer speaking in Charlottesville in August 2017 was leaked by Milo Yiannopoulos in November 2019, in which Spencer reacted to the aftermath of the Unite the Right rally and the death of Heather Heyer; in the recording, Spencer says: "We are coming back here like a hundred fucking times. I am so mad. I am so fucking mad at these people. They don't do this to fucking me. We are going to fucking ritualistically humiliate them. I am coming back here every fucking weekend if I have to. Like this is never over. I win! They fucking lose! That's how the world fucking works. Little fucking kikes. They get ruled by people like me. Little fucking octaroons ... my ancestors fucking enslaved those little pieces of fucking shit. I rule the fucking world. Those pieces of fucking shit get ruled by people like me. They look up and see a face like mine looking down at them. That's how the fucking world works. We are going to destroy this fucking town."

=== Ethno-nationalism ===
According to the Southern Poverty Law Center, Spencer has advocated for a white homeland for a "dispossessed white race", and called for "peaceful ethnic cleansing" to halt the "deconstruction" of what he describes as "white culture". To this end, he has supported what he has called "the creation of a White ethnostate on the North American continent", an "ideal" that he has regarded as a "reconstitution of the Roman Empire". Spencer claims to be a "white Zionist" and praised Israel's 2018 Jewish Nation-State Law, saying: "Jews are, once again, at the vanguard, rethinking politics and sovereignty for the future, showing a path forward for Europeans." His position was described as disingenuous because the alt-right in general was not supportive of Zionism upon, at the minimum, a cursory examination of right-wing websites, described insufficient evidence for inextricably linking the ideology to the racist-right. However, finding viable paths for both support and condemnation of Israel by anti-Semites through viewing support for the Israeli government's policies as being distinct from or inherent to Jewry respectively, with regard to Spencer, Canadian historian Derek Penslar found his characterization of the Nation-State Law as a "path forward for Europeans" to be a similar trend to authoritarian regimes' in Hungary and Poland policies since 1948 to both embrace Israel and have ambivalence, if not hostility toward diaspora Jews, accomplished through whitewashing their persecutions of Jews in World War II, "yet admir[ing] Israel for its commitment to ethnonationalism, its reluctance to admit immigrants alien to the dominant nationality, and its military strength."

Prior to the UK vote to leave the EU, Spencer expressed support for the multi-national bloc "as a potential racial empire" and an alternative to "American hegemony", stating that he has "always been highly skeptical of so-called 'Euro-Skeptics'".

=== Nazi rhetoric ===
Spencer has made frequent use of Nazi rhetoric and gestures in his public speeches. He called Donald Trump's 2016 presidential election "the victory of will", a phrase evoking the title of Leni Riefenstahl's Triumph of the Will (1935), a Nazi-era propaganda film. Spencer urged his supporters to "party like it's 1933," the year Hitler came to power in Germany. In the weeks following, Spencer quoted Nazi propaganda and denounced Jews.

At a conference Spencer held celebrating Trump's election, he mentioned the "mainstream media" in those terms: "or perhaps we should refer to them in the original German: Lügenpresse", meaning 'lying press' or 'press of lies', a term frequently used by Joseph Goebbels in Nazi propaganda. Spencer ended his speech with: "Hail Trump, hail our people, hail victory!", and a number of his supporters gave the Nazi salute and chanted in a similar fashion to the Sieg Heil chant. Spencer also admires George Lincoln Rockwell, the founder of the American Nazi Party, for using "shock as a positive means to an end".

During an interview with Nick Fuentes after the assassination of Charlie Kirk, Spencer claimed that the Republican Party "fumbled Charlie Kirk's death, which could have been a Reichstag fire of sorts."

=== Donald Trump ===
Spencer supported Donald Trump in the 2016 presidential election. Following Trump's appointment of Steve Bannon as chief White House strategist and senior counselor, Spencer said Bannon would be in "the best possible position" to influence policy.

By 2018, however, Spencer had distanced himself from Trump, saying on Twitter that "the Trump moment is over, and it's time for us to move on." The Southern Poverty Law Center reported that, around the same time, the white nationalist movement as a whole was dissatisfied with Trump's presidency, particularly because they believed Trump had failed to put a stop to non-white immigration into the US.

In a July 2019 interview on CNN, he called Trump's tweet about four congresswomen (telling them to "go back" to where they came from) "meaningless", as he believed Trump was practicing a "con game" in not clearly developing a white nationalist agenda. He stated that Trump was merely providing "tweets that are meaningless and cheap and express the kind of sentiments you might hear from your drunk uncle while he's watching Hannity."

In 2020, following the assassination of Iranian general Qasem Soleimani, Spencer said that he regretted voting for Trump. In August of that year, Spencer said he would be voting for Joe Biden and the straight Democratic ticket in the 2020 election. "The MAGA/Alt-Right moment is over. I made mistakes; Trump is an obvious disaster; but mainly the paradigm contained flaws that we now are able to perceive. And it needs to end," Spencer wrote. "So be patient. We'll have another day in the sun. We need to recover and return in a new form." The Biden campaign renounced his support.

Spencer endorsed Kamala Harris in the 2024 presidential election, claiming that "Donald Trump and the MAGA movement bring nothing but stupidity and chaos" and that he realised "if we fully implement what they [Trump and his allies] are talking about, it's going to be a catastrophe for everyone".

=== Gender roles ===
During the 2016 United States presidential election, Spencer tweeted that women should not be allowed to make foreign policy. He also stated in an interview with The Washington Post that his vision of America as a white ethnostate includes women returning to traditional roles as childbearers and homemakers. In October 2017, when asked his opinion on American women having the right to vote, he said: "I don't necessarily think that that's a great thing" after stating that he was "not terribly excited" about voting in general. In his 2024 endorsement of Kamala Harris, he said, "Women on average are as smart as men, if not smarter than men on average … I have total confidence in Harris and her administration as competent administrators. That's never really been an issue."

Spencer opposes same-sex marriage, which he has described as "unnatural" and a "non-issue", commenting that "very few gay men will find the idea of monogamy to their liking". Despite his opposition to same-sex marriage, Spencer barred people with anti-gay views from the National Policy Institute's annual conference in 2015.

=== Health care ===
Spencer supports legal access to abortion, in part because he believes it would reduce the number of black and Hispanic people, which he says would be a "great boon" to white people. Spencer also supports a national single-payer health care system because he believes it would benefit white people.

=== Religion ===
Spencer is an atheist. He believes that the Christian church previously had held some pragmatic value, because Spencer believes that it helped unify the white population of Europe. He opposes traditional Christian values as a moral code, due to the fact that Christianity is a universalizing religion, rather than an ethnic religion. Spencer references his views on Christianity as being influenced by the German philosopher Friedrich Nietzsche. Citing Nietzsche's criticism of anti-Semitism and nationalism, Scott Galupo writing for The Week, Sean Illing for Vox, and Jordan Harris for The Courier-Journal have described Spencer's interpretation of Nietzsche's philosophy as incorrect. Spencer's Radix Journal has promoted paganism, running titles such as "Why I am a pagan". Spencer has also described himself as a "cultural Christian".

=== Geopolitics ===
Spencer states he voted for Democrat John Kerry over incumbent Republican George W. Bush during the 2004 United States presidential election, because Bush stood for "the war".

Spencer criticized President Trump's administration for escalating tensions between the U.S. and Iran. In January 2020, Spencer tweeted: "To the people of Iran, there are millions of Americans who do not want war, who do not hate you, and who respect your nation and its history. After our traitorous elite is brought to justice, we hope to achieve peace, reconciliation, and forgiveness."

Spencer has advocated for the US pulling out of NATO, and called Russia the "sole white power in the world" in 2016. His former partner, Nina Kouprianova, under her pen name Nina Byzantina referred to herself as a "Kremlin troll leader" and regularly aligned to Kremlin talking points, with ties to Aleksandr Dugin, a far-right ultranationalist Russian leader in the Eurasianism movement and writer of Foundations of Geopolitics. The webzine founded by Spencer in 2010, called Alternative Right, accepted direct contributor pieces from Dugin. Kouprianova has translated several books written by Dugin. The books were later published by Spencer's publishing house, Washington Summit Publishers. However, he has since reversed his stance on Russia, and has strongly supported Ukraine and NATO since the 2022 Russian invasion of Ukraine, and described Ukraine as his number one issue in the 2024 United States presidential election that caused him to vote for Kamala Harris.

=== Libertarianism ===
In the late 2000s, Spencer was involved in the libertarian movement, supporting libertarian Republican presidential candidate Ron Paul and hosting him at his discussion club, the Robert Taft Club. Spencer later disavowed libertarianism as incompatible with white nationalism, and in 2017 he came into conflict with libertarians after reportedly attempting to "crash" an International Students for Liberty conference.

=== Later self-description ===
Spencer has frequently contradicted his own previous statements about what he believes and how he identifies himself ideologically. In a single text exchange in 2022, he told a journalist for Jezebel that he "no longer identifies as a white nationalist." In June 2022, he described himself on Bumble as "politically moderate".

== Influences ==
According to political scientist Tamir Bar-On, "Spencer's key intellectual influences are largely those thinkers concerned with winning the 'cultural war' against egalitarianism, liberal democracy, capitalism, socialism, and multiculturalism," citing Nietzsche, the German Conservative Revolution (including Carl Schmitt, Ernst Jünger, and Martin Heidegger), French New Right theorists like Alain de Benoist and Guillaume Faye, along with other far-right figures such as Julius Evola, Francis Parker Yockey, Aleksandr Dugin, and "US right-wingers with a penchant for race-driven politics or anti-Semitism" like Sam Francis, Jared Taylor, and Kevin B. MacDonald.

== Legal issues ==
=== Sines v. Kessler ===
In June 2020, Norman K. Moon, the federal district judge presiding over Sines v. Kessler, a civil rights lawsuit that stemmed from the violence at the Unite the Right rally in 2017, allowed Spencer's lawyer, John DiNucci, to withdraw from the case, on the grounds that Spencer owed DiNucci a significant amount in legal fees, and also was not cooperating with him in preparing the case; Spencer thereafter represented himself. At the time of DiNucci's withdrawal, Spencer also faced a $500 fine and two weeks in a county jail in Montana if he did not pay over $60,000 he owed to the guardian ad litem representing his children's interests in Spencer's ongoing divorce proceedings there. Ultimately, Spencer avoided going to jail after settling the debt.

On November 23, 2021, the jury reached a mixed verdict in the case. Along with the other defendants, Spencer was found liable on two counts; civil conspiracy under Virginia state law, and race-based harassment or violence. The jury deadlocked on the remaining two charges of conspiracy to commit racially motivated violence, and whether defendants had knowledge of the conspiracy and failed to prevent it from taking place. Jurors awarded more than $25 million in total damages, with Spencer personally liable for $700,000 in punitive damages. Spencer stated he would appeal the judgement, saying the "entire theory of that verdict is fundamentally flawed." Roberta Kaplan meanwhile said that the plaintiffs' lawyers plan to refile so that a new jury can decide on the deadlocked claims.

== Personal life ==
In 2010, Spencer moved to Whitefish, Montana. He says he splits his time between Whitefish and Arlington, Virginia, although he has said he has lived in Whitefish for over 10 years and considers it home. As of 2017, Spencer was renting an apartment in Alexandria, Virginia. He moved out in August 2018. Prior to his marriage, Spencer's dating history included Asian women, which he has said predates his white nationalism, though this evaluation is disputed.

Spencer married Nina Kouprianova, a Russian-Canadian with Georgian roots, in 2010, with whom he has two children. He separated from Kouprianova in October 2016. In April 2017, Spencer said he and his wife were not separated and were still together.

In October 2018, Kouprianova accused him, in divorce documents, of multiple forms of abuse. Kouprianova provided hours of recordings and text messages to the press in order to substantiate her allegations. Court documents alleged emotional abuse, financial abuse, and violent physical abuse, including when Kouprianova was four months pregnant, and frequently in front of their children. According to media reports, the recordings and text messages show Spencer telling his wife that he will "fucking break [her] nose," encouraging her to commit suicide, and apologizing for previous incidents of physical abuse. A caregiver to the children testified in court about Spencer's abuses towards both her and Kouprianova. Spencer denied all allegations made against him, and was not charged with a crime.
