= Jason Kessler =

American white supremacist and far-right political activist

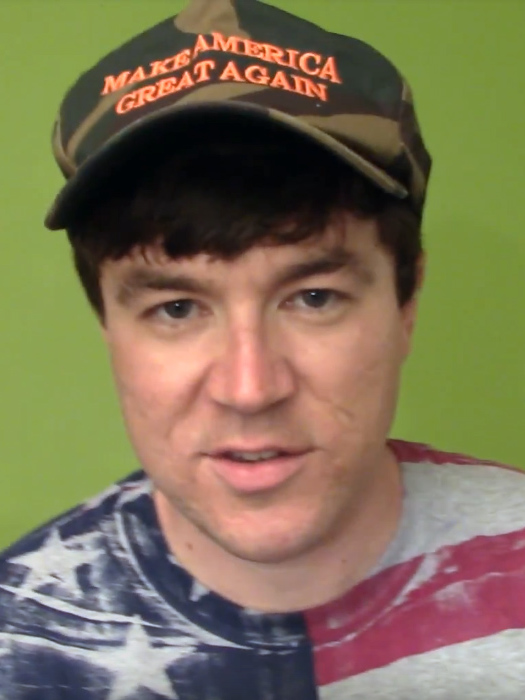
- Kessler wearing a Make America Great Again hat, c. 2017
- Born: September 22, 1983 (age 43); Charlottesville, Virginia, U.S.
- Education: University of Virginia (BA)
- Occupation: Alt-right activist
- Years active: 2015–present
- Known for: Unite the Right rally
- Movement: Alt-right; Far-right; White nationalism Neo-Nazism

Jason Eric Kessler (born September 22, 1983) is an American white supremacist, and antisemitic conspiracy theorist. Kessler organized the Unite the Right rally held in Charlottesville, Virginia, on August 11–12, 2017, and the Unite the Right 2 rally held on August 12, 2018.

Kessler is a supporter of neo-Nazism, far-right politics, and the alt-right.

== Background ==
Jason Kessler graduated from the University of Virginia with a Bachelor of Arts in psychology in 2009. Prior to his involvement in political extremism, Kessler wrote that he was employed in various working class jobs as a dishwasher, gym technician, truck driver and handyman.

Up to 2008, Kessler was a supporter of Democrats and held liberal views. He voted for Barack Obama. He also engaged in activism with the Occupy movement before being dismissed for attempting to register homeless individuals. According to a public Facebook post by former college friend, Jenny Rebecca, Kessler lived for a time in government-subsidized housing with a roommate who was described as an African Muslim.

In late 2015, Kessler began his original blog JasonKessler.net. The site was used to publish a noir crime novel, Badland Blues, as well as a work of poetry, Midnight Road.

In November 2016, he revealed lewd and offensive tweets made by Charlottesville vice-mayor and councilman Wes Bellamy, who is also a teacher at Charlottesville's Albemarle High School. Bellamy first drew criticism from Kessler when he called a press conference to call for the removal of the Robert E. Lee statue in Charlottesville in March 2016. In December, Kessler began circulating a petition demanding that Bellamy resign or be removed from office. During the ensuing investigations, Bellamy voluntarily resigned from his teaching position at Albemarle High School in December 2016.

In January 2017, while attempting to gain signatures for his petition, Kessler was arrested for misdemeanor assault after punching a man in the face. He pleaded guilty and was sentenced to 50 hours of community service and 30 days of suspended sentence. A charge of perjury was filed but subsequently dropped.

In April 2017, Kessler was contracted to write two pieces for The Daily Caller. He wrote another piece in May about the first protests in Charlottesville over the statue of Lee. Kessler also wrote several posts for the anti-immigrant white nationalist site VDare. One of Kessler's posts claimed that the government was waging genocide against white people by policies that cause low Caucasian birth rates.

After ProPublica contacted The Daily Caller about Kessler's ties to white supremacist groups, the outlet severed its ties with Kessler, and its Executive Editor Paul Conner defended his editorial judgment.

Kessler was sworn in as a member of the far-right organization the Proud Boys. Proud Boys founder Gavin McInnes said that he kicked Kessler out of the group once his views on race became known.

== 2017 Unite the Right rally ==
Video posted to YouTube by Kessler on August 11, 2017, after obtaining permission for the Unite the Right rally

Video posted to YouTube by Kessler on August 12, 2017, after the rally from his motel room in Charlottesville.

Kessler was one of the organizers of the Unite the Right rally on August 12, 2017. The rally was a protest of the removal of the statue of Robert E. Lee, a cause Kessler had taken up a year earlier when he began his crusade against Bellamy. Kessler was also involved in a smaller protest of the removal of the statue on May 14, 2017, which ended in a torch-lit march. At this event, he was arrested for failure to obey an officer's commands. On July 11, Kessler appeared at town hall to promote his rally and distanced himself from another rally that was held by the Loyal White Knights of the Ku Klux Klan.

On July 25, Kessler and most speakers scheduled to attend the rally were described by the Anti-Defamation League (ADL) as alt-right leaders. The ADL's director said that Kessler was listed because of both his statements and his activities. Kessler responded by calling the ADL hypocritical for "attacking uppity whites when they support the ethno-state of Israel" and saying he was "happy to be considered the enemy of the ADL".

On August 7, the city manager attempted to change the location of the rally, away from Emancipation Park towards McIntire Park. The city manager confirmed that Kessler had a First Amendment right to protest but stressed the city's need to protect public safety. On August 10, the Rutherford Institute and the Virginia state branch of the ACLU supported Kessler in an injunction lawsuit, later known as Kessler v City of Charlottesville, in the United States District Court. They pointed out that "Two other groups that oppose Kessler's message, which have called on thousands of protesters to attend, have been granted permits by the city for downtown parks close to Emancipation Park on August 12." Arguments were heard in Judge Glen Conrad's courtroom on the afternoon of August 11. The court enjoined the city from revoking Kessler's permit to conduct a demonstration at Emancipation Park on August 12, and the rally went ahead.

The rally on August 12 turned violent and resulted in the death of Heather Heyer when one of the rally attendees drove at high speed into a crowd of counter-protestors several blocks from the rally. On the day following the rally Kessler attempted to hold a news conference in front of Charlottesville City Hall which was quickly overtaken by protesters. However, before ending the short news conference, Kessler stated, "I disavow any political violence and what happened yesterday was tragic." He also posted videos online in which he blames the city for the violence and death.

On August 18, 2017, Kessler contradicted his previous statement by tweeting: "Heather Heyer was a fat, disgusting Communist. Communists have killed 94 million. Looks like it was payback time." The next morning, Kessler repudiated the tweet and blamed Ambien, Xanax, and alcohol for the tweet. He received criticism for the tweet from other white nationalists, including Richard B. Spencer and influencer Baked Alaska. Kessler subsequently deleted his Twitter account. Hacker and internet troll Andrew Auernheimer, a.k.a. weev, later claimed that he hacked Kessler's Twitter account.

Kessler was allowed to move to Ohio in October 2018. Earlier that month, Kessler was arrested on suspicion of doxing after local anti-racist activist Emily Gorcenski was swatted and reported the incidents to the police.

On September 6, 2018, a jury in Charlottesville ordered Jeffrey Winder to pay a fine of $1 and no jail time for the misdemeanor assault charge against Kessler that took place on August 13, 2017. Winder and his attorney James Abrenio appealed his original February 2018 guilty finding, which included a 30-day jail sentence.

== 2018 Unite the Right rally ==
In November 2017, Kessler applied for a permit to hold a rally in Charlottesville in August 2018, on the anniversary of the first march. In December 2017, the city of Charlottesville denied the permit, writing that Kessler's application "likely underestimates the number of participants" and that "no reasonable allocation of city funds or resources" could guarantee a violence-free event. Kessler sued the city, and in June 2018, Kessler sought a temporary injunction from the court to permit a rally in Emancipation Park on the anniversary. On June 24, 2018, during a court hearing, Kessler unexpectedly dropped plans to hold a rally in Charlottesville, and posted plans on Twitter for a rally in Washington, D.C. On August 3, 2018, after withdrawing his request for an injunction, Kessler voluntarily dismissed the lawsuit against the City of Charlottesville.

Kessler later applied for and obtained a permit to hold a "Unite the Right 2" anniversary rally in Lafayette Park in Washington, D.C., across from the White House. In addition to Kessler, the former politician and Ku Klux Klan leader David Duke was set to address the rally participants.

However, other far-right individuals and groups who participated in the first Unite the Right rally – including Richard B. Spencer, the League of the South, Christopher Cantwell, Andrew Anglin, and militia groups – indicated that they would not attend the anniversary rally, having distanced themselves from Kessler, who holds "pariah status among his fellow racists".

In late August, live stream video surfaced of Kessler in which he reveals that due to numerous lawsuits filed against him, he has moved in with his parents. Kessler's father can be heard in the video berating him and demanding that he stop recording white supremacist content in his room.

== Sines v. Kessler ==
In October 2017, Kessler was named as a defendant in a case brought by nine Charlottesville residents following the Unite the Right rally in August 2017. Kessler was the first named defendant in the case due to his role as a primary organiser of the Unite the Right rally. The trial was originally scheduled for late 2020, but was postponed due to the COVID-19 pandemic. The trial began on October 25, 2021, and the jury reached a verdict on November 23. Kessler was found liable on two counts: civil conspiracy under Virginia state law, and engaging in race-based harassment or violence.

== See also ==
- Antisemitism in the United States
- Far-right politics in the United States
- Racism in the United States
- Radical right (United States)
