= Elliott Kline =

American white supremacist (born 1991)

Elliott Kline in a 2018 New York Times interview

Elliott Kline (born 1991), also known as Eli Mosley, is an American neo-Nazi and military impostor. He is the former leader of Identity Evropa, and was a prominent organizer in the alt-right movement between 2017 and 2018. He was also a key figure behind the August 2017 Unite the Right rally in Charlottesville, Virginia, which was one of several neo-Nazi rallies that Kline helped organize.

The New York Times revealed in February 2018 that Kline had lied about his military service. Specifically, Kline had pretended to be a combat veteran of Iraq when in fact he had been stationed in Pennsylvania throughout his time in the military. Following the revelation of his lie, Kline withdrew from political activism.

== Early life ==
Kline grew up in Reading, Pennsylvania. He graduated from Wilson High School in 2010 then attended several colleges before dropping out without obtaining a degree. He later joined the Pennsylvania National Guard, where he served for about six years.

== Alt-right activism ==
Kline's pseudonym of Eli Mosley was inspired by British fascist Oswald Mosley. Kline joined the Proud Boys in 2016. He helped organize the 2017 white supremacist Unite the Right rally. After Kline condemned a tweet by Jason Kessler, who wrote that the counterprotester killed at the rally in a car attack deserved to die, Kessler tweeted that, "There is an individual who has done a coordinated smear job on me, from within the movement; that person is Eli Mosley, Elliott Kline. From the beginning he was fucking things up."

Kline became the head of Identity Evropa in August 2017. At the same time, Kline took a position as a writer for the neo-Nazi Daily Stormer, for which he promoted racial hatred and conspiracy theories about Jews.

In order to bolster his reputation, throughout his time in the alt-right movement Kline claimed that he had deployed to and fought in Iraq, when in fact his unit never left Pennsylvania during his service. The lie was exposed in a February 2018 New York Times report, and Kline subsequently withdrew from political activism.

== Legal issues ==
In October 2017, Kline was named as a defendant in Sines v. Kessler, a case brought by nine Charlottesville residents against various organizers, promoters, and participants in the Unite the Right rally. Kline was jailed in January 2020 for contempt of court after ignoring orders to produce records, including credentials for his email and social media accounts. He was held at the Albemarle–Charlottesville County Regional Jail for about a week. The trial was originally scheduled for late 2020, but was postponed due to the COVID-19 pandemic. The trial began on October 25, 2021. During the trial, plaintiffs showed a video deposition of Samantha Froelich, an ex-girlfriend of Kline's, who described her experiences as a former member of Identity Evropa and the alt-right. The jury reached a partial verdict on November 23. Kline was found liable on two claims: civil conspiracy under Virginia state law, and engaging in race-based harassment or violence.

== See also ==
- Alt-right
- Antisemitism in the United States
- Far-right politics in the United States
- Racism in the United States
- Radical right (United States)
