= Unicorn Riot =

American independent nonprofit media collective

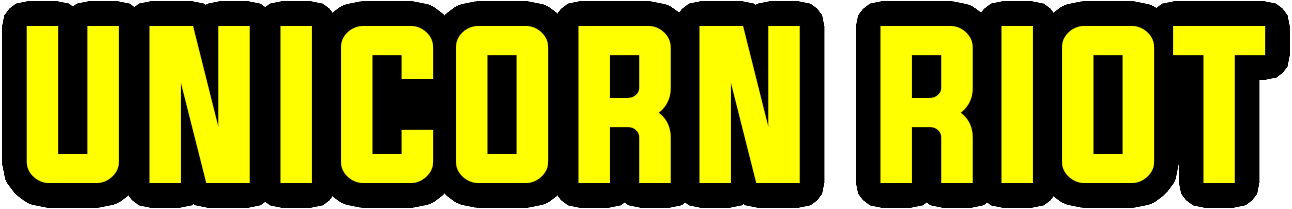
- Founders: Niko Georgiades; Andrew Neef; Lorenzo Serna; Dan Feidt; Christopher Schiano; Pat Boyle; Ray Weiland; et al.
- Type: Nonprofit organization Journalism
- Legal status: 501(c)(3)
- Headquarters: St. Paul, Minnesota
- Official language: English
- Website: www.unicornriot.ninja

Unicorn Riot is a decentralized, nonprofit, left-wing media collective that originated online in 2015. The group is known for reporting on far-right organizations and sources of racial and economic injustice in the US. The non-hierarchical media organization operates in the US cities of Boston, Denver, Minneapolis/St. Paul, and Philadelphia as well as in South Africa. They produce live streams of political rallies and protests and are funded by viewer donation and grants.

== Structure ==
Unicorn Riot currently has around 10 members, based in Boston, Denver, Minneapolis, Philadelphia and South Africa. The media collective is non-hierarchical and makes decisions based on consensus. The organization is frequently described as left-wing.

Unicorn Riot has maintained a channel on livestream.com since May 2015. Besides creating live video of protests, the media collective also engages in investigative journalism, producing web series, video packages, blogs, and podcasts. They have published documents obtained through open records requests, including a copy of the Denver Police Department Crowd Management Manual. They also produce the weekly news show Deprogram. Unicorn Riot releases its content under a Creative Commons license.

== History ==
The founding members of Unicorn Riot met while filming direct actions in support of Tar Sands Blockade and Occupy Wall Street. Some had previously worked for online news outlets and had grown frustrated with news organizations that failed to publish their work. The founders of Unicorn Riot started meeting in Minneapolis in the fall of 2014. Among the founders were Lorenzo Serna, Andrew Neef, Niko Georgiades, Pat Boyle, and Ray Weiland. Unicorn Riot claims to seek to "amplify the voices of people from marginalized communities" and to broadcast and bring context to stories that are not picked up by the mainstream media. Early on, they documented the Ferguson protests following the shooting of Michael Brown. During the next year, Unicorn Riot registered as an educational 501(c)(3) nonprofit organization.

Unicorn Riot journalists are often embedded in protests, and film from the front lines. Members of the media collective have been repeatedly targeted for arrest by law enforcement officers and often have their cameras and equipment confiscated. Their press credentials have also been challenged by the police. In 2022, Unicorn Riot was classified as a member of the news media by Minnesota's Fourth District Court as part of Energy Transfer LP v. Greenpeace International.

== Activities ==
=== Black Lives Matter protests ===
Unicorn Riot has documented a number of rallies and protests related to the Black Lives Matter movement. Following the November 2015 shooting of Jamar Clark in Minneapolis, Unicorn Riot maintained a live stream of the occupation of the Minneapolis Police Department's 4th Precinct station. The media collective also documented the protests that took place following the shooting of Philando Castile, including blockages of interstate freeways.

=== Denver homeless encampments ===
In Denver, Colorado, Unicorn Riot live streamed the removal of homeless encampments, including an eviction that took place during a blizzard on the morning of December 15, 2015.

=== Dakota Access Pipeline protests ===
During the protests against the Dakota Access Pipeline, Unicorn Riot was one of the first media groups to be present when Standing Rock Sioux tribe members set up the Sacred Stone Camp on April 1, 2016. The media collective has maintained a near continuous presence at the pipeline protests. Video from Unicorn Riot showing a crowd of protesters being sprayed with water cannons during sub-zero temperatures was used to contradict police reports that the cannons were only being used to put out fires. Four Unicorn Riot reporters were arrested in September and October 2016. Chris Schiano and Georgiades were arrested on September 13 as they were filming protesters who had locked themselves to equipment being used to construct the pipeline. Reporter Lorenzo Serna was arrested in both North Dakota and Iowa, and reporter Jenn Schreiter was arrested in October while reporting on a lockdown at a DAPL construction site in Iowa.

=== Unite the Right rally ===
Unicorn Riot had documented several of the chat rooms in the Discord application prior to the Unite the Right rally in August 2017, which led to violence between alt right groups and counter-protesters, including the death of one person. The group subsequently released this material, which was used to identify the anonymous users on Discord who were involved with violence at the rally.

=== Documentary film ===
Unicorn Riot produced a feature-length documentary film about the resistance to the Dakota Access Pipeline entitled Black Snake Killaz: A #NoDAPL Story. The film was premiered on November 17, 2017 at the Parkway theater in Minneapolis, Minnesota, and released online free of charge for educational purposes via Unicorn Riot's website on November 18, 2017.

=== Gab ===
In October 2018, Unicorn Riot discovered that on Gab, individual users on the platform led by alt-right figure Brittany Pettibone organized on the video game chat and voice room platform Discord and that some of the discussions centered on antisemitism and achieving "ethno-nationalism."

=== Identity Evropa/American Identity Movement (IE/AIM) ===
In March 2019, Unicorn Riot leaked more than 770,000 Discord messages from Identity Evropa's (IE) national server called "Nice Respectable People Group" as well as that of Nicholas J. Fuentes' America First, James Allsup's The Nationalist Review, and the group's Slack server. The leaks revealed that Identity Evropa was attempting an entryist campaign into the Republican Party such as one member meeting with Billy Ciancaglini (party candidate for the Mayor of Philadelphia), sympathizing with Representative Steve King of Iowa and others seeking to join College Republican clubs. Several members were doxed, and the group was rebranded American Identity Movement (AIM), as part of a public relations effort to avoid scrutiny.

=== Shutdown of brown coal infrastructure in North Rhine-Westphalia, Germany ===
Unicorn Riot livestreamed the "Ende Gelände" direct action protests in Germany, whose aim is to shut down brown coal fossil fuel infrastructure in North Rhine-Westphalia. Ende Gelände (roughly translated to "Here no further") achieved this by entering the brown coal pit mine and blocking the brown coal transport railroad track.

=== Murder of George Floyd ===
After the May 2020 murder of George Floyd, Unicorn Riot began doing a series of live streams on Twitter and YouTube of the protest and riot in Minneapolis and Saint Paul. Unicorn Riot has had a history of working in the Twin Cities and covering police brutality and other violence.

=== Patriot Front ===
The Guardian reported on 28 January 2022 that more than 400 gigabytes of private Patriot Front chat logs on Rocket.Chat had been obtained and published by Unicorn Riot. The logs reveal efforts to expand membership, with the founder Thomas Rousseau writing "We are absolutely desperate for new people. We've been in the 220's to 230's membership rut for nearly a full year". The group can be seen attempting to inflate its numbers and importance, outlining plans to create fake social media accounts pretending to be bystanders to marches, and posting deceptive material on Twitter, Reddit and 4chan, as well as direct messaging traditional media outlets and rejoicing when it is mentioned in the news. The leaders frequently scold members for not participating in events.
