= Identity Evropa =

Neo-Nazi group in the United States

Identity Evropa American Identity Movement
- The Dragon's Eye, the group's symbol as Identity Evropa
- Other name: AmIM, AIM, IE (formerly)
- Leaders: (Founder) Nathan Damigo (2016 – Aug. 2017); Elliot Kline (Aug. – Nov. 2017); Patrick Casey (Nov. 2017 – Nov. 2020)
- Founded: March 2016
- Dissolved: November 2020
- Country: United States
- Headquarters: Washington D.C.
- Ideology: Neo-Nazism; White supremacism; White nationalism; Alt-right; Identitarianism
- Political position: Far-right
- Status: Dissolved
- Size: roughly 800 in July 2018
- Website: www.identityevropa.com https://www.americanidentitymovement.com/

Identity Evropa (/juːˈroʊpə/) was an American far-right, neo-Nazi, neo-fascist, and white supremacist organization established in March 2016. It was rebranded as the American Identity Movement in March 2019. In November 2020, the group disbanded. Leaders and members of Identity Evropa, such as former leader Elliot Kline, praised Nazi Germany and pushed for what they described as the "Nazification of America".

The white supremacist slogan "You will not replace us" originated from the group. In an attempt to boost its numbers, Identity Evropa allied itself with the broader alt-right and identitarian movements and the group targeted college campuses and students in particular by distributing slogans on fliers, posters, and stickers. According to the Southern Poverty Law Center (SPLC), Identity Evropa was one of several groups which contributed to the growth of white supremacism in the United States during the 2010s, with the organization being designated by it as an influential hate group during its four-year existence.

In March 2018, it was reported that the group was seeing steep declines in membership. The collapse was similarly seen in other alt-right groups, and was attributed to a widespread public backlash against white supremacist organizations that occurred after the 2017 Unite the Right rally. In March 2019, following a leak of the group's Discord messages published by the non-profit left-wing media collective Unicorn Riot, Patrick Casey, the group's leader, rebranded the group with the new name "American Identity Movement" with an Americana aesthetic, despite initially claiming they were unrelated organizations.

The Identity Evropa organization distances itself from "Les Identitaires", the identitarian nationalist movement that emerged in France in 2003. While the latter is a French movement that also includes far-right approaches and nationalism, their focus is on French nationalism and, in addition to anti-Islam their ideology consists of anti-Americanism, as they see the United States and Islam as the two primary imperialistic threats to Europe.

== History ==
The organization's founder, Nathan Damigo (/dəˈmɪɡoʊ/), is a self-described member of the identitarian movement. Damigo grew up in San Jose, California, and was a member of the U.S. Marine Corps from 2004 to 2007. In November 2007, Damigo robbed a La Mesa, California, taxicab driver at gunpoint, believing that the man was Iraqi. Damigo was convicted of armed robbery and was incarcerated for a year in county jail and four years in state prison. He said of the event that "it's something that I'm certainly not proud of," attributing his behavior to "major issues" after returning from Iraq.

In prison, Damigo began to read works by far-right figures, including David Duke. He was also influenced by J. Philippe Rushton and Nicholas Wade. After being released from prison in 2014, Damigo led the National Youth Front, the youth wing of the American Freedom Party. The group was classified as a hate group by the SPLC and Anti-Defamation League, with the SPLC reporting that it was founded by "racist Southern California skinheads that aims to deport immigrants and return the United States to white rule." The National Youth Front later disbanded. Damigo founded Identity Evropa in March 2016. His activities with "racist organizations" has been disavowed by his father.

In the aftermath of the Unite the Right rally, the leadership position passed onto Elliot Kline, aka Eli Mosley. The group participated in the planning for the October 19, 2017 speech by Richard B. Spencer, a white supremacist, at the University of Florida, where Mosley also spoke. In addition to Spencer and Mosley, the speakers included Mike Enoch, a white nationalist blogger. The event drew about 2,500 protesters, vastly outnumbering Spencer's supporters.

== Re-branding as "American Identity Movement" ==
In March 2019, the non-profit left-wing media collective Unicorn Riot released more than 770,000 messages leaked from Discord channels related to the group. The leaks had been published on the "Discord Leaks platform" established by Unicorn Riot. Within the leaked chat logs, members of the groups are discovered to have laid out plans to "infiltrate" local Republican parties and win public offices, plans to influence local media to garner positive coverage, as well as plans for rebranding the group's racism and antisemitism with the "identitarian" label and innocuous-sounding slogans such as "Make America Beautiful Again". The Southern Poverty Law Center commented that the group's rebrands "offers further cover to smuggle white nationalist views into mainstream politics", and that its attempts to influence media for spreading propaganda and recruiting were "often successful". Shortly after the leak, Patrick Casey said that the group "has been retired" and announced the formation a new group, "American Identity Movement". The SPLC commented that the new group will continue Identity Evropa's efforts at "quietly working to normalize their ideas within the Republican Party." After the leak, Discord removed Identity Evropa chat channels from the platform. The group switched to Slack, but was again removed shortly. Zelle stated that they would investigate and remove associated accounts, after journalists informed the platform that Identity Evropa was using it to raise funds. Legal documents filed to the Arizona Corporation Commission under the AIM front group "Foundation for American Society" was found to have used Identity Evropa's email address.

The group's logo after it was re-branded

The leak of Identity Evropa's Discord messages led to journalists and antifascist activists exposing the identities of many of its members. Following the leak, an investigation by HuffPost reported that seven Identity Evropa members were also currently serving in the U.S. armed forces and were actively disseminating Identity Evropa materials in their communities. According to military spokespersons, several of them were being investigated by their military branches. A Chesterfield County Police officer in Virginia who was working as a school resource officer at a local high school was also identified as a pledge coordinator for Identity Evropa. The officer was suspended from his position, and the Chesterfield police chief began the process for him to be fired per state law. In April 2019, a teacher at Valley Christian School near San Jose, California was placed on paid leave while the school investigated allegations he was a member of the group, based on leaked chat logs. In the same month, a master sergeant of the U.S. Air Force's 50th Space Wing was being investigated by the military as a possible member, again based on leaked chat logs. The sergeant had allegedly posted photographs of himself applying group stickers, holding banners, and painting Identity Evropa's logo on an underpass in Colorado Springs. Also in April, a 19-year-old National Guard recruit from Chaska, Minnesota and a member of the group, was recalled from basic training and investigated by the Minnesota National Guard.

In late April 2019, Unicorn Riot published several audio recordings of the group's weekly meetings. These audio recordings reveal that, despite Casey's claim that American Identity Movement is not a rebrand of Identity Evropa, the two are in fact the same group. Matthew Warner, the group's second-in-command, admitted in the recordings that Identity Evropa's membership list and dues payments directly carry over to the AIM, and reiterated that the group would only accept non-Jewish White Americans. After the Discord leak, the groups has used stricter vetting processes in an attempt to prevent future leaks, where members are required to make two Skype calls and one in-person meeting before being given "sensitive information" such as the location of the group's new headquarter in Washington D.C.. After the rebrand, Identity Evropa continued its attempts to coordinate its members to edit the group's Wikipedia page into more favorable terms. Leaders of the group expressed fear that the existing page for IE would simply be renamed into AIM, which would foil the groups's rebranding attempts. In the recordings, Casey urged members to rebrand their social media accounts as well, saying that the groups's new Americana aesthetic would help its members avoid being held accountable for their membership. Discussing the group's strategy, Casey said in the recordings that the group would appeal to the "boomer patriot crowd", and would ideally exploit political crises to seize control of the United States government, and replacing it with a white-only "identitarian" regime.

== Fake Antifa Twitter account ==
In June 2020, during the George Floyd protests, Identity Evropa set up a false flag account on Twitter purporting to represent the antifascist movement antifa. The account urged violence, with comments such as "Tonight's the night, Comrades ... Tonight we say 'Fuck The City' and we move into the residential areas... the white hoods.... and we take what's ours." According to a spokesperson for Twitter, it was not the first time that Identity Evropa had created such fake accounts. Before the account was closed down by Twitter, it had been cited by United States law enforcement officials as an example of left-wing radicals attempting to foment violence. A comment on the account was re-posted on Instagram by Donald Trump Jr., who commented about antifa, "They're not even pretending anymore." John Cohen, a former senior Department of Homeland Security official, said, "Time and time again we have seen public figures, media personalities and even government officials amplifying disinformation and extremist rhetoric intended to inspire violence. ... A great step in deescalating the violence currently facing the Nation would be for this to end." Facebook also took action against supposed antifa accounts, and had prevented the Twitter postings from being distributed on its platform.

In 2017, Data & Society, a non-profit research organization, documented how fake antifa accounts are used to damage the movement, writing, "Various white supremacist groups have consistently tried to damage Antifa's reputation in the media by 'doxing' protesters (releasing their personal information) or impersonating them online ... Throughout 2017, right-wing manipulators utilized parody to discredit Antifa, taking advantage of available Twitter handles and public confusion about the organization and their motives."

== Views ==
Identity Evropa is a neo-Nazi and white supremacist group; the organization espouses white supremacist and white separatist views. The group endorses racial segregation. It "bills itself as a 'generation of awakened Europeans' who 'oppose those who would defame our history and rich cultural heritage'". Damigo describes it as "an identitarian organization" and says that the group's aim is to "act as a fifth column, over time shifting the edifice of our political establishment" in favor of what he describes as "pro-white" interests. Identity Evropa's spokesman and director of administration, Reinhard Wolff, states that Identity Evropa is engaged in a "culture war" in an effort to create a "90 percent white" America.

The white supremacist slogan "You will not replace us" originated from the group, according to the Anti-Defamation League, after Damigo and other members of Identity Evropa appeared on camera chanting the words during LaBeouf, Rönkkö & Turner's HEWILLNOTDIVIDE.US project at New York's Museum of the Moving Image in February 2017.

Identity Evropa excludes Jews from membership because Damigo regards Jews as non-white. Only those "of European, non-Semitic heritage" may join the group. Damigo claims that "Jewish power, Jewish influence" has "been extraordinarily negative for people of European heritage". He has refused to say whether he acknowledges the Holocaust.

The Anti-Defamation League has labeled Identity Evropa a white supremacist group, and the Southern Poverty Law Center (SPLC), which tracks extremist groups in the United States, has designated it as a hate group. Their campus-centric advertising posters depict photos of classical Greek sculptures of men overlaid with various short slogans which urge whites to embrace cultural elitism. Mark Potok, a senior fellow at the SPLC, states, "Identity Evropa is merely the latest iteration of the white-supremacist movement. Although you might think, based on their propaganda, that they're all about Plato and Aristotle and Socrates, in fact they're merely a gussied-up version of the Klan." Anna North, writing in The New York Times, states that the group promotes racism under the guise of white racial pride and cultural identity for those who are of European ancestry.

== Activities ==
In December 2016, the group had roughly 200 members. In a February 2017 interview, Damigo claimed a membership of 300. The group has distributed fliers on dozens of college campuses including the University of Virginia, Virginia Tech, Lynchburg College, Liberty University, University of Massachusetts Amherst, UCLA, San Diego State University, University of California, San Diego, Penn State, Ohio State, and the University of Washington. According to an ADL count, Identity Evropa was by far the most active white supremacist group on college campuses in 2017, responsible for 158 of the 346 incidents nationwide of the posting of white supremacist propaganda fliers. These fliers typically show photos of classical and neoclassical sculpture. According to art critic Ben Davis, the random use of dissimilar photos demonstrates a poor understanding of European culture and art history.

At Ohio State, the group has considered seeking recognized student organization status. The group's "#ProjectSiege" aims to "siege" college campuses with literature in order to combat what Damigo describes as a "false anti-white narrative" by professors, whom Damigo calls "charlatans."

In late 2016, Damigo and Identity Evropa members traveled to Washington, D.C., for a post-election conference hosted by the white supremacist National Policy Institute, at which keynote speaker Richard B. Spencer and several other attendees rendered a Nazi salute.

During the 2017 Berkeley protests, Damigo punched a young woman, captured on video that subsequently went viral. Footage showed Damigo punching the woman in the face, then running away into the crowd. The attack prompted calls for Damigo's arrest or expulsion from Cal State Stanislaus, where he is a student; the university subsequently said that it was investigating Damigo.

Damigo has been identified as a leader in the August 2017 Unite the Right rally. A news source that has interviewed him states that "Damigo has made these rallies a key driver for recruiting new members of the group". Additionally, Peter Cvjetanovic, one of the members of Identity Evropa, was dubbed as the "angry torch guy" in the Unite the Right rally.

On July 28, 2018, around 45 members of Identity Evropa, some dressed as construction workers, demonstrated outside the Mexican consulate in Manhattan, New York City, holding large letters that spelled out "Build the Wall". The government of Mexico said it had written a diplomatic note to the State Department protesting the incident. Later that day, a group of several dozen Identity Evropa members hung a banner in Fort Tryon Park in Upper Manhattan. The banner, which said "Stop the invasion, end immigration", overlooked the Henry Hudson Parkway. The response of the Washington Heights and Inwood communities was to hold a "vigil against hate" at the same site on July 31.

On February 9, 2019, eleven Identity Evropa members went to the University of Utah's Block U carrying colored smoke flares and a banner that read, "End immigration!" Patrick Casey stated that the action was in response to the University's condemning of the organization earlier in the year, after it had posted stickers around the campus. Police were called, but the members left before they arrived.

On April 27, 2019, hours after the Poway synagogue shooting in California, around ten members of Identity Evropa disrupted a book discussion event at the Politics and Prose bookstore at Washington D.C. The book discussed at the event was Dying of Whiteness by Jonathan Metzl, which discusses how working class white Americans who were attracted by the Trump administration's promises end up having a greater risk of illness and a shorter life expectancy as a result of its policies. Members of the group interrupted Metzl's speech using a bullhorn, said "You would have the white working class trade their homeland for handouts. But we, as nationalists and identitarians, can offer the workers of this country a homeland, their birthright, in addition to health care, good jobs and so forth.", and chanted "This land is our land" while walking through the bookstore, before exiting ten minutes later. Washington D.C. mayor, Muriel Bowser, condemned the Poway shooting and the bookstore disruption in a tweet, denouncing the former as "horrific act of hate and antisemitism" and the latter as "ignorance and hate".

The 2019 leaks also disclosed that the organizations were targeting college conservatives, attempting to convert them to their ideology.

== Dissolution ==
Casey announced the dissolution of American Identity Movement (AIM) in a statement posted online on November 2, 2020.

== See also ==
- Christian Identity
- Far-right politics#United States
  - Far-right subcultures#United States
- Fascism in North America#United States
  - Fascism in the United States
- Ghost skin
- List of fascist movements
  - List of fascist movements by country
- List of Ku Klux Klan organizations
- List of neo-Nazi organizations
- List of organizations designated by the Southern Poverty Law Center as hate groups
- List of white nationalist organizations
- Nazism in the Americas
- Neo-nationalism
- Radical right (United States)
- White backlash#United States
- White genocide conspiracy theory
- White nationalism#United States
  - White nationalism in the United States
- White supremacy#United States
  - White supremacy in the United States
