= Roberta Kaplan =

American lawyer (born 1966)

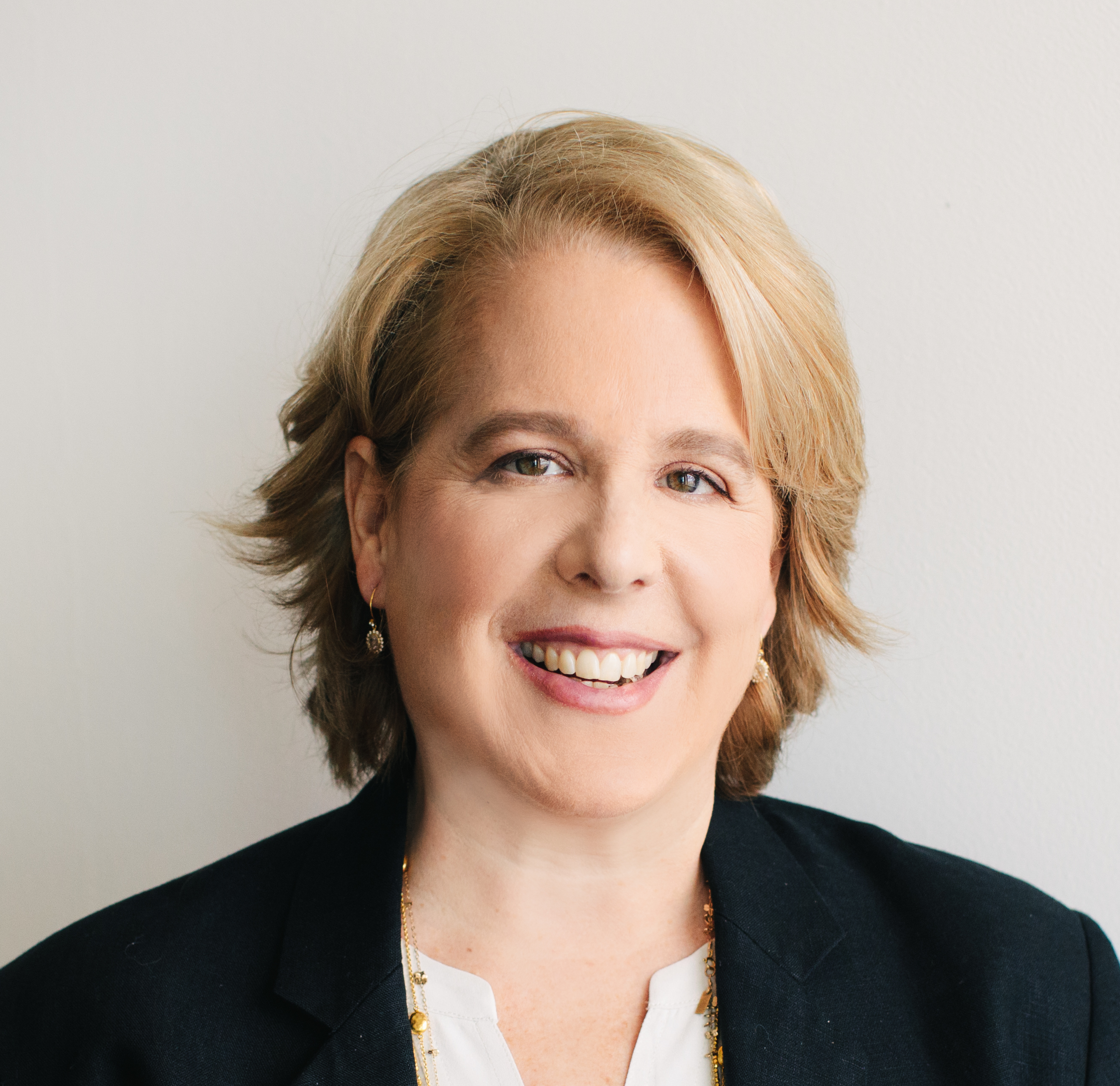
- Kaplan in 2018
- Born: Roberta Ann Kaplan; 1966 (age 59–60); Cleveland, Ohio, U.S.
- Education: Harvard University (BA); Columbia University (JD)
- Known for: United States v. Windsor; Sines v. Kessler; E. Jean Carroll v. Donald J. Trump
- Spouse: Rachel Lavine (m. 2005)
- Children: 1

Roberta Ann Kaplan (born 1966), also known as Robbie Kaplan, is an American lawyer focusing on commercial litigation and public interest matters. Kaplan successfully argued before the Supreme Court of the United States on behalf of LGBT rights activist Edith Windsor, in United States v. Windsor, a landmark decision that invalidated a section of the 1996 Defense of Marriage Act and required the federal government to recognize same-sex marriages. She was a partner at Paul, Weiss, Rifkind, Wharton & Garrison before starting her own firm in 2017. In 2018, she co-founded the Time's Up Legal Defense Fund.

== Early life and education ==
A native of Cleveland, Ohio, Roberta Kaplan grew up in a Jewish household. She graduated from Hawken School in Gates Mills, Ohio, in 1984. LGBTQ scholar and activist Aaron Belkin was Kaplan's high school friend and prom date. She earned a B.A. in Russian history and literature from Harvard University in 1988. While in college she spent a semester abroad in Moscow and "discovered a passion for political activism when she became active in the movement to free Soviet Jewry". She received her J.D. from Columbia Law School in 1991.

== Career ==
Kaplan served as a law clerk for Mark L. Wolf of the U.S. District Court in Massachusetts. While clerking for Judith Kaye, of the New York Court of Appeals, she assisted Kaye with a number of academic articles. Kaplan's scholarly articles include "Proof versus Prejudice" (2013).

Kaplan joined the law firm Paul, Weiss, Rifkind, Wharton & Garrison LLP in 1992 and made partner in 1999. She has served on the board and as chair of the board of the Gay Men's Health Crisis, which created the Roberta Kaplan Legal Center to provide free legal services.

In July 2017 Kaplan left Paul Weiss to start her own practice Kaplan Hecker & Fink LLP, a law firm dedicated to commercial litigation and public interest matters. She departed her firm in June 2024, creating a new partnership, Kaplan Martin, with litigator Timothy S. Martin and others.

=== United States v. Windsor ===
In 2009, Kaplan agreed to represent Edith Windsor pro bono. Windsor's wife, Thea Spyer, had died two years after they wed in Canada, leaving Windsor her sole heir. Because their marriage was not recognized under existing U. S. federal law, Windsor received an estate tax bill of $363,053. Windsor went to gay rights advocates seeking redress, but could find no one to take her case. She was referred to Kaplan, who later recalled, "When I heard her story, it took me about five seconds, maybe less, to agree to represent her." Kaplan had been co-counsel on the unsuccessful bid for marriage equality in New York state in 2006.

On June 26, 2013, the U.S. Supreme Court issued a 5–4 decision declaring Section 3 of the Defense of Marriage Act to be unconstitutional. Subsequent to Windsor, the Supreme Court ruling in Obergefell v. Hodges (2015) struck down all remaining state and federal laws against same-sex marriage across the United States. Kaplan wrote about United States v. Windsor in the book Then Comes Marriage.

=== Sines v. Kessler ===
In 2017, Kaplan and co-counsel Karen Dunn filed a civil lawsuit on behalf of students, clergy members and local residents against 15 individual defendants and associated groups for damages following alleged injuries sustained at the 2017 Unite the Right rally in Charlottesville, Virginia. The lawsuit is based on the Ku Klux Klan Act and according to The New York Times, the defendants are "an array of neo-Nazis, white identitarians and old-line pro-Confederates."

=== Time's Up ===
In 2018, Kaplan co-founded the Time's Up Legal Defense Fund with Tina Tchen. The fund has raised more than $24 million to provide legal defense for sexual violence victims, especially those who experienced misconduct in the workplace and led 780 attorneys and 50 cases under way. In 2019, Kaplan and Tchen later co-founded HABIT, an anti-sexual harassment advisory.

On August 9, 2021, Kaplan resigned from her role as chairwoman of Time's Up, after she was named in the report released on August 3, 2021, by New York Attorney General Letitia James that followed the investigation of sexual harassment allegations against New York Governor Andrew Cuomo, and after an open letter from a group of former Time's Up staffers and clients to the board of Time's Up was published. The report alleged Kaplan was involved in an effort to discredit a woman who had accused Cuomo of sexual harassment.

=== E. Jean Carroll defamation lawsuits ===
Kaplan represents writer E. Jean Carroll, who filed a defamation lawsuit against Trump on November 4, 2019. According to The Washington Post, Kaplan claimed "she intends to prove that Trump acted with 'malice,' meaning that he knew his statements were false or showed reckless disregard for the truth."

The lawsuit was moved from state to federal court when the US Department of Justice moved to take over Trump's defense (a motion that was denied in October 2020). Kaplan said she welcomed pursuing the lawsuit in federal court. Although the Department of Justice appealed that decision, Kaplan told reporters, "we are confident that the Second Circuit will affirm the District Court’s comprehensive and well-reasoned opinion."

Kaplan represented Carroll in her civil trial E. Jean Carroll vs. Donald J. Trump, that began on April 25, 2023, in federal court at the United States District Court for the Southern District of New York. The jury found in favor of Carroll on May 9, 2023, and awarded her damages of $5 million after finding Trump liable for sexual abuse and defamation. On January 26, 2024, after a second defamation trial against Donald Trump that was limited only to the question of damages for statements Trump made while president, a different jury awarded Carroll $83.3 million in compensatory and punitive damages.

=== Mary Trump v. Donald Trump et al. ===
On September 24, 2020, Kaplan and her firm filed a lawsuit with the New York Supreme Court in Manhattan, on behalf of plaintiff Mary L. Trump, accusing President Donald Trump and his siblings, Maryanne Trump Barry and Robert Trump, of decades of financial fraud and civil conspiracy.

== Works ==
- Roberta A. Kaplan, with Lisa Dickey. Then Comes Marriage: United States v. Windsor and the Defeat of DOMA. New York: W. W. Norton, 2015. ISBN 9780393248678

== Awards and recognition ==
- Forty Most Influential Lawyers under Forty, National Law Journal (2005)
- 100 Most Influential Lawyers, Above The Law (2013)
- Litigator of the Year, American Lawyer (2013)
- National Public Service Award, Stanford University (2013)
- Honorary Doctorate, Johns Hopkins University (2014)
- Lifetime Achievement Award, New York Law Journal (2015)
- In June 2019, to mark the 50th anniversary of the Stonewall riots, an event widely considered a watershed moment in the modern LGBTQ rights movement, Queerty named her one of the Pride50 "trailblazing individuals who actively ensure society remains moving towards equality, acceptance and dignity for all queer people".
- 2019 recipient of Gay Men's Health Crisis Joan H. Tisch Award for Community Service and Philanthropy
- Crain's 2019 Most Powerful Women in New York
- George A. Katz Torch of Learning Award (TOL) (2023)

== Personal life ==
Kaplan is openly gay. In September 2005, Kaplan married her partner, Rachel Lavine, in Toronto, Canada. Kaplan is Jewish.
