= Loyal White Knights of the Ku Klux Klan =

White supremacist and antisemitic hate group

- Legal status: Active
- Headquarters: Pelham, North Carolina, U.S.
- Leader: "Imperial Wizard"; Chris Barker
- Affiliations: Ku Klux Klan
- Volunteers: ~100 members

The Loyal White Knights of the Ku Klux Klan is a group styled after the original Ku Klux Klan (KKK). Formed around 2012, it aims to "restore America to a White, Christian nation founded on God's word".

The organization presents itself as part of a "new KKK". By rejecting the hate group label, it proclaims itself a "non-violent pro-white civil rights movement", mostly known for organizing and participating in white supremacist rallies, and spreading racist, antisemitic, anti-immigrant, homophobic and Islamophobic propaganda. Unlike the Protestant second Ku Klux Klan (1915–1944), the group unites white-supremacist Christians of different denominations. It is however somewhat stricter than other contemporary KKK chapters in accepting only "native-born white American Citizen[s …] of Christian Faith" who "believe in White Supremacy and 100% Americanism."

== Activism ==
In a 2014 recruiting campaign, the group left flyers near cars as well as in driveways in predominantly white neighborhoods of Texas, Louisiana, Illinois, Pennsylvania, South Carolina, and Georgia.

In July 2015, members of the Loyal White Knights, which is currently considered the largest KKK chapter, and members of the Trinity White Knights protested against the removal of the Confederate flag from the South Carolina State House in Columbia, South Carolina, in the wake of the Charleston church shooting. Their rally in front of the State House was also attended by members of other KKK chapters, members of the Neo-Nazi National Socialist Movement, and Christian fundamentalists. According to press reports, protesters waved Nazi flags, and chanted racial slurs before they clashed with black counter-protesters.

Chris Barker, the group's "Imperial Wizard" was noted as the organizer of a "White lives matter" demonstration on March 2, 2016, in Anaheim, California, when KKK members attacked counter-protesters, triggering a fight when a KKK member stabbed a counter-protester with a flagpole. His compatriot William E. Hagen AKA Will Quigg, the "California Grand Dragon West Coast King Kleagle" of the Loyal White Knights and as such in charge of the area from Texas to the Pacific, was attacked. Brian Levin, a professor and the director of the Centre for the Study of Hate and Extremism at California State University, San Bernardino, intervened, saving Quigg from further harm. Quigg proceeded to play down the Holocaust and he also blamed Jews for what he called "white cultural genocide". Quigg supported Donald Trump early in the primaries of the 2016 United States presidential election. However, in March 2016, Quigg changed his endorsement to Hillary Clinton, claiming that she has a "hidden agenda", although questions have been raised by Snopes over the sincerity of his endorsement. The group has faced internal conflicts and leadership changes, for instance there have been instances where announcements regarding leadership were made and then retracted, indicating some level of disorganization.

In 2017, members of the group participated in the Unite the Right rally in Charlottesville, Virginia alongside the Confederate White Knights of the Ku Klux Klan, the alt-right, neo-Nazis, white nationalists/supremacists, Southern nationalists/neo-Confederates, Identitarians, the Proud Boys, and members of various militia groups. Earlier on July 8, 50 members of the Loyal White Knights of the Ku Klux Klan had held a rally in Charlottesville which was denounced by hundreds of counter-protesters. In July 2017, Chris Barker was interviewed by Univision's Ilia Calderón. During the interview, he called Calderón a racial slur and stated that his group was going "to burn you out". In reference to immigrants, He also stated: "We killed 6 million Jews the last time (a reference to the Holocaust). Eleven million is nothing" (referencing the illegal immigrant population of America).

Also in 2017 around Valentine's Day, members distributed fliers inviting people to join the chapter. These flyers were left on driveways as well as in yards around Grand Junction, Colorado.

According to the Anti-Defamation League, the Loyal White Knights managed to distribute propaganda to more than fifteen states, and averaged 79 Klan fliering incidents per year.

== Criminal activity and arrests ==
A number of members from the Loyal White Knights have been arrested for various crimes. In August 2015, a federal jury convicted Klan member Glendon Scott Crawford from Galway, New York, for plotting to kill Muslims and then president Barack Obama with a self-made radiation weapon. His arrest came after he was reported by members of two local synagogues that Crawford had approached to fund and plan his attack. In December 2016, Crawford was sentenced to 30 years of prison and lifetime supervised release for attempting to produce and use a radiological dispersal device, conspiracy to use a weapon of mass destruction, and distributing information relating to weapons of mass destruction. He is the first US citizen to be found guilty of attempting to build and use a radiological dispersal device.

On December 6, 2016, Loyal White Knights founder Christopher Eugene Barker and the California Grand Dragon William Ernest Hagen were arrested in December 2016 for the stabbing incident in Barker’s home in Yanceyville, North Carolina which left one Klansman wounded. On April 7, 2017, a Superior Court jury found William Hagen guilty for assault with a deadly weapon and criminal threats.

On August 28, 2018, Klansman Justin Adams was fined for littering after he was detained by authorities for spreading posters and Klan propaganda in the urban area of Roxboro.
