= Christopher Cantwell =

American neo-Nazi (born 1980)

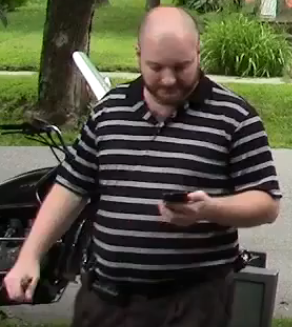
- Cantwell in 2014
- Born: Christopher Charles Cantwell; November 12, 1980 (age 45)
- Other name: The Crying Nazi
- Occupations: Podcast and radio host, writer, far-right provocateur
- Notable work: Radical Agenda
- Status: Incarcerated, awaiting trial
- Convictions: Interstate transmission of extortionate threats (18 U.S.C. § 875); Interstate transmission of threats to injure property or reputation (18 U.S.C. § 875)
- Penalty: 3 years and 5 months imprisonment

Christopher Charles Cantwell (born November 12, 1980) is an American white supremacist, neo-Nazi, antisemitic conspiracy theorist, and federal informant.

A member of the broader alt-right movement, Cantwell earned attention during and immediately after his participation in the August 2017 Unite the Right rally in Charlottesville, Virginia. Cantwell was featured prominently in a Vice News Tonight documentary about the rally and its participants, in which he is shown threatening to kill protesters, wielding rifles and a handgun, and joining fellow antisemitic conspiracy theorists in marching with tiki torches, chanting "Jews will not replace us!"

Shortly after the rally, Cantwell published a video in which he wept while sharing that he had learned there was a warrant for his arrest. The video went viral, with some observers noting the discrepancy between the emotional video and the tough persona Cantwell had projected in the Vice documentary. He has since been widely referred to and ridiculed as "The Crying Nazi".

In July 2018, Cantwell was convicted after pleading guilty to two counts of misdemeanor assault and battery for pepper spraying two people at the rally. On September 28, 2020, Cantwell was found guilty on one felony count of transmitting extortionate communications and one felony count of threatening to injure property or reputation. Cantwell was sentenced to three years and five months in prison on February 24, 2021. The charges stemmed from Telegram messages Cantwell sent to a member of a rival neo-Nazi group, in which he threatened to rape the man's wife in front of his children if he did not give Cantwell information about the identity of another member of the group.

In 2021, Cantwell and others were found liable for civil conspiracy and racially motivated harassment or violence in Sines v. Kessler, a federal civil suit against organizers, promoters, and participants in the Unite the Right rally.

== Early life ==
Cantwell grew up in Stony Brook, New York. His father was an air traffic controller, IRS agent and the owner of a landscaping business. His mother is a homemaker. His maternal grandmother was opera singer Lillian Trotta, née Ventimiglia, who sang under the stage name Lillian Raymondi. Cantwell has claimed his mother suffered sexual abuse at the hands of her father during her childhood. He has a younger brother as well as a half-brother and a half-sister, the latter two stemming from a previous relationship of his father. His younger brother has been involved in gang violence and was serving a prison sentence in 2019. Cantwell attended Ward Melville High School in East Setauket, New York, but left school and did not graduate. He received his GED while serving his first jail sentence in 2000.

In 2012, Cantwell moved to Marlborough, New Hampshire, before returning to New York in 2013 and relocating to Keene, New Hampshire in 2014.

Cantwell has worked as a landscaper, an overnight technical support provider, and later started his own computer consulting business.

== Broadcasting and writing ==
Cantwell writes essays on his personal blog about topics including white supremacy, alt-right politics, libertarianism, and the men's rights movement. He has written for and republished essays about the men's rights movement to A Voice for Men, a men's rights and antifeminist website. In 2013 and 2014, he wrote and republished his anti-police essays as a volunteer for Cop Block, a police accountability organization.

Cantwell co-hosted the anarcho-capitalist radio show Free Talk Live but was suspended in 2015 after tweeting a racial slur against an African American person who criticized him. He was later removed from the position permanently.

Meanwhile, in December 2013, Cantwell began what he originally called Some Garbage Podcast, disseminated through YouTube and elsewhere, and in April 2015, renamed it Radical Agenda, subtitled "a show about common sense extremism". By calling compatriots who recorded the conversations and posted them on his blog, Cantwell continued to broadcast from jail while he was incarcerated in August–December 2017 on charges related to the Unite the Right rally. In January 2019, Cantwell created a more toned-down version of Radical Agenda called Outlaw Conservative. On April 9, 2019, Cantwell published a blog post announcing that he had been "neglecting to deal with some serious personal problems for a very long time", and that he needed to "stop, avoid recording devices, and pull [himself] together." Cantwell told the Southern Poverty Law Center that he had decided to step away from broadcasting because "Jews" had taken an "emotional toll" on him and that he needed to "[step] away from the microphone to avoid another 'Crying Nazi' moment". Cantwell returned to broadcasting and writing by June of the same year.

After he was released from prison in December 2022, Cantwell created an online fundraiser on the GiveSendGo Christian crowdfunding website, where he wrote that he was living in a halfway house and had been "left ... impoverished and exhausted" by his legal battles.

Both his personal website as well as the website of his podcast "Radical Agenda" went offline in January 2025, roughly a month and a half before his arrest for strangling a neighbor.

=== Social media suspensions ===
On August 16, 2017, Facebook said it had shut down Cantwell's Facebook and Instagram profiles due to statements he made in connection with the Unite the Right rally. The following day it was reported that Cantwell had been banned from online dating service OkCupid after a woman reported receiving a message from him after seeing him in the Vice News Tonight segment. In a blog post published on August 17, 2017, Cantwell wrote, "I have been shut out of nearly every financial and communications system I once had available. PayPal, Venmo, Dwolla, and Stripe all disabled my accounts. I was shut out not only of Facebook, Instagram, Twitter, and MailChimp, but now even my online dating profiles at OkCupid, Match.com, and Tinder have all been disabled." On March 18, 2019, the far-right social network Gab tweeted a statement that they had indefinitely banned an unnamed "controversial user" for making two "inflammatory political posts". Cantwell posted on his blog that he believes he was the one who was banned, after he discovered his profile had been blanked and he was unable to log in, and it was later confirmed the banned user was Cantwell.

A December 2017 episode of the Radical Agenda podcast featured a conversation between Cantwell and Andrew "weev" Auernheimer, a white supremacist, Internet troll, and the webmaster of The Daily Stormer. In the episode, Auernheimer called for the mass murder of Jewish children. Shortly after, GoDaddy announced that they would no longer host the Radical Agenda website after finding it in violation of their policies against encouraging and promoting violence.

Cantwell wrote of the difficulties he was facing due to his suspensions in a private Telegram group in October 2018, saying, "My inability to grow [Radical Agenda] by being on other platforms, my inability to make money, is threatening to bankrupt me and end the show".

== Ideology and politics ==
Cantwell has described himself as a member of the alt-right, a fascist, and a libertarian. The Anti-Defamation League includes Cantwell in its list of alt-right figures, and the Southern Poverty Law Center has profiled Cantwell, describing him as "an anti-Semitic, Alt-Right shock jock and an unapologetic fascist, who spews white nationalist propaganda with a libertarian spin".

By Cantwell's own account, he was originally "radicalized" to libertarianism in 2009 after listening to a presentation by former Libertarian presidential candidate Michael Badnarik. In 2009 he announced he would be running as a Libertarian Party candidate for the U.S. House of Representatives in New York's 1st District, but he did not collect enough signatures to get on the ballot. He has been repeatedly expelled from libertarian organizations because of his violent and racist views.

Cantwell has held strong anti-police views, including advocating for violence against police officers. In a June 2012 Facebook post about police hypothetically attempting to pull over a driver, he said, "It is my honest opinion that this driver would be morally justified in shooting that police officer at the moment the [police car's] lights go on." He was later removed from the Free State Project and banned from their events for this and other statements the group found to violate the libertarian non-aggression principle. Cantwell has posted photographs of himself dressed as a police officer who had been shot in the forehead for a 2014 Halloween party, and later that year he applauded the man who killed two police officers in New York City.

Cantwell went to Keene, New Hampshire to be part of the protest group Free Keene, which is associated with the Free State Project. In 2014, Cantwell was one of three members of what Stephen Colbert called the "Free Keene Squad" who were featured in a mocking segment on The Colbert Report, which lampooned them as "brave patriots [who] are fighting back… against government overreach" by harassing "meter maids". Ian Freeman, a leader of "Free Keene", later stated that Cantwell's violent anti-police rhetoric had been excluded from Free Keene.

Over time, Cantwell has focused less on anti-police and anti-government positions, saying "I have become convinced that our problems are a lot more racial than anything... the police are not my biggest problem right now." In March 2018, white supremacist and Internet troll Andrew Auernheimer, known online as weev, leaked a screenshot of an online conversation with Cantwell. In reply to a message from Auernheimer condemning other people for talking to police, Cantwell is shown saying "I talked to cops too, gonna talk to the feds soon most likely". Auernheimer replied to Cantwell to say "that's fucking shitty scumbag behavior," and in the post accompanying the screenshot criticizes Cantwell for being "an admitted government informant" and describes the behavior as incompatible with Cantwell's calls for revolt. Soon after the leak, Cantwell published a blog post confirming that he was working with the government and claiming that he was doing so in an effort to get retribution at Antifa. The confirmation that he was working with law enforcement was met with anger from some members of the far-right.

Although Cantwell endorsed Donald Trump for president in January 2016, he has said that he hoped for a leader who was "a lot more racist than Donald Trump" and who "does not give his daughter to a Jew" (referring to Ivanka Trump's marriage to Jared Kushner).

=== Unite the Right rally ===
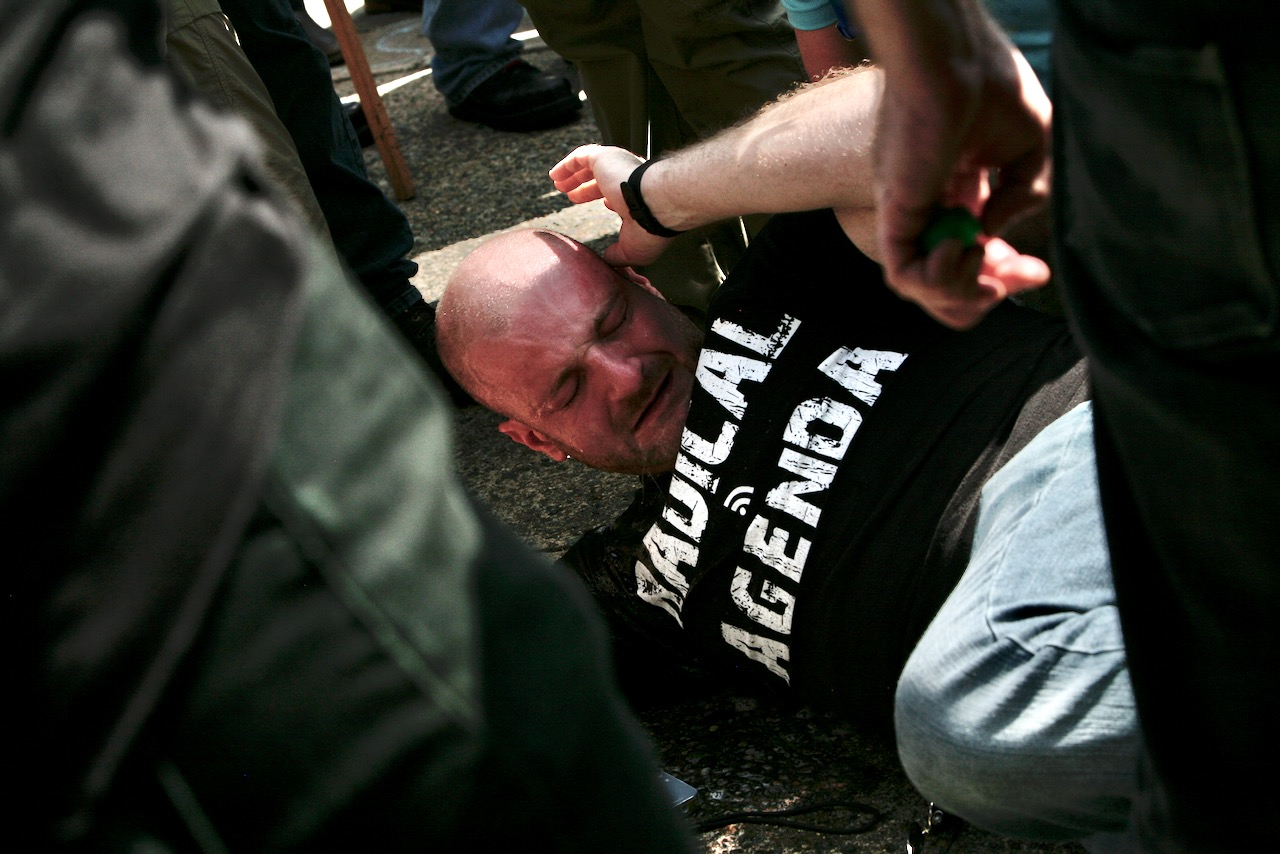
Christopher Cantwell, pictured after being pepper-sprayed at the Unite the Right rally in August 2017

Cantwell participated in the Unite the Right rally held in Charlottesville, Virginia, on August 11–12, 2017. He was featured prominently in "Charlottesville: Race and Terror", an episode of Vice News Tonight about the rally and the groups who were present. He is first pictured marching through the University of Virginia campus among a group of white supremacists carrying tiki torches and chanting "Jews will not replace us." He later is shown bragging about carrying guns, working out, and "trying to make [himself] more capable of violence," later saying "We're not nonviolent. We'll fucking kill these people if we have to." In the same interview, he called the murder of Heather Heyer "more than justified", claiming "the fact that none of our people killed anybody unjustly, I think, is a plus for us", and threatened that "a lot more people are gonna die before we're done here, frankly."

== Legal issues ==
In 2000, at age 19, Cantwell pleaded guilty in Suffolk County, New York to driving while intoxicated (DWI), criminal possession of a weapon, and criminal possession of stolen property. He later told the Southern Poverty Law Center's Hatewatch, "I was involved in so much bullshit when I was a teenager, honestly, that like what I got caught for was the least of the shit I did." He received a second DWI charge in 2009, and when he announced his candidacy for the U.S. House of Representatives he was facing a possible felony conviction and four years in jail for receiving two DWIs within ten years in New York.

=== Criminal charges related to Unite the Right ===
Following the 2017 Unite the Right rally, Cantwell was indicted in Albemarle County, Virginia, on three felony assault charges stemming from the August 11 torchlit march: two counts of illegal use of tear gas and one count of malicious bodily injury with a caustic substance.

On August 16, 2017, Cantwell published a video of himself weeping while speaking about the warrant for his arrest, and his fears that he might be killed by police. The video went viral and earned him the nickname of "The Crying Nazi." Cantwell turned himself in to police on August 24 and was transported to Charlottesville, where he was initially ordered to be held without bond. He was indicted on the tear gas charges in December, and paid $25,000 bail with funds donated by supporters on the white supremacist and neo-Nazi crowdfunding websites Hatreon and GoyFundMe.

In March 2018, Cantwell was charged with public swearing and intoxication in Loudoun County, Virginia. He ultimately pleaded guilty to this misdemeanor and paid $116 in fees and court costs. Separately, prosecutors accused Cantwell of attempting to intimidate witnesses to the August assaults via his social media accounts, and the court imposed more stringent terms on Cantwell's bond.

In November 2017, at the preliminary hearing for the felony assault case, the unlawful bodily injury charge was dismissed, with the court ruling that "so many people had pepper spray that night that some attacks could not be definitively attributed to Cantwell." In July 2018, Cantwell entered into a plea agreement with prosecutors in which he pleaded guilty to two counts of misdemeanor assault and battery for pepper spraying two people at the rally. He was sentenced to two concurrent jail sentences of one year with all but seven months suspended, and he was released from jail. As part of the sentence, Cantwell was required to leave Virginia within eight hours of the sentencing and was banned from returning to the state for five years. He was also banned from publicly discussing the two people he attacked at the rally. Two days after the sentencing, Cantwell made a thinly veiled reference to the two victims in a social media post in which he boasted about "gassing" them. Cantwell pleaded guilty to violating of the terms of his pre-trial release by making the social media posts, and was fined $250.

=== Sines v. Kessler ===
In October 2017, Cantwell was listed as a defendant in Sines v. Kessler, the federal civil lawsuit against various organizers, promoters, and participants of the Unite the Right rally. Cantwell was listed in the lawsuit as a "promoter" of the event.

Cantwell was originally represented by attorneys Elmer Woodard and James Kolenich. The two attorneys twice asked to be dismissed from the case; first over nonpayment, and a second time after Cantwell sent threatening messages to one of the plaintiffs' attorneys. After the second request was granted, Cantwell proceeded to represent himself pro se. In January 2020, he wrote and filed a plea which included a long quote from Adolf Hitler, whom Cantwell described only as a "famous 20th-century statesman".

The trial was originally scheduled for late 2020, but was postponed due to the COVID-19 pandemic. The trial began on October 25, 2021, and the jury reached a verdict on November 23. Cantwell and all other defendants were found liable for civil conspiracy under Virginia state law, and ordered to pay $500,000 in punitive damages. Cantwell was also among the defendants found liable for racially motivated harassment or violence. The jury were deadlocked on the remaining two claims, which argued he and other defendants had engaged in a federal conspiracy to commit racially motivated violence.

Cantwell filed a pro se appeal on March 20, 2023, arguing that the jury held "improper passion and prejudice", and that he couldn't adequately prepare his defense as he was imprisoned on unrelated extortion charges.

=== Extortion and threats against a rival white supremacist ===
Cantwell was involved in a feud with members of the Bowl Patrol, a loose group of white supremacists who name themselves after the bowl haircut of Dylann Roof, the perpetrator of the 2015 white supremacy-motivated Charleston church mass shooting. In April 2018, Cantwell had been the first guest on the Bowl Patrol's new podcast, but over the following months he fell out with the group and became a target of prank calls to his podcast, fake accounts pretending to be him, and music videos making fun of him. Cantwell made violent threats towards the group, and followed through on threats to contact law enforcement, including the FBI, about pranks perpetrated by its members. Prosecutors later alleged that Cantwell emailed law enforcement more than 50 times over a four-month period in 2019. In June 2019, Cantwell threatened a member of the Bowl Patrol who went by the pseudonym "CheddarMane", saying he would rape his wife in front of his children and contact child protective services (CPS) about CheddarMane's alleged drug use if he did not provide Cantwell with information on the identity of "Vic Mackey", another pseudonymous Bowl Patrol member. According to prosecutors, Cantwell followed through with the threat to contact CPS. In September 2019, Cantwell met with the FBI thinking he was helping form a case against the Bowl Patrol members. However, the FBI were actually forming a case to prosecute Cantwell for his June threats. Unrelated to Cantwell's attempt to identify the anonymous user, in July 2020 the Sacramento, California Sheriff's Office identified "Vic Mackey" as Andrew Casarez, a resident of Orangevale, California and obtained a gun violence restraining order against him.

On January 23, 2020, Cantwell was arrested by the FBI and charged with extortion over interstate communications and making threatening interstate communications in relation to the threats made against CheddarMane. Court filings also alleged that several days before his arrest, Cantwell used Telegram to threaten an attorney working on a lawsuit against him and others involved with the Unite the Right rally.

During Cantwell's arrest, officers recovered seventeen firearms and other weapons from his residence and vehicle. Cantwell remained in jail from the time of his January arrest until trial, after the judge sided with prosecutors who argued that he was a risk to public safety. He was set to go to trial in March 2020, but the trial date was postponed to September 15, 2020. On July 8, Cantwell was indicted on additional charges of cyberstalking and threatening to injure property or reputation. The federal trial began on September 22, 2020, and on September 28, 2020, Cantwell was found guilty on one count of transmitting extortionate communications and one count of threatening to injure property or reputation, and found not guilty of the cyberstalking charge. Prosecutors asked for Cantwell to be sentenced to 51 months in prison; Cantwell's defense attorneys requested he be sentenced to time served for the thirteen months he spent in jail since his arrest. Judge Paul Barbadoro sentenced Cantwell to 41 months in prison on February 24, 2021, as well as two years of supervised release following completion of the prison sentence. Cantwell appealed the conviction to the First Circuit Court of Appeals in October 2021, which upheld the convictions in April 2023. Cantwell was released from custody in December 2022.

=== Strangulation charge ===
Cantwell was arrested on March 2, 2025, and charged with one count of felony strangulation as well as simple assault and criminal mischief.
