= Bausman =

Bausman is a surname. Notable people with the surname include:

- Andreas Bausman (fl. 1750s), builder of the Bausman Farmstead, an historic home and farm located in Lancaster County, Pennsylvania
- Charles Bausman (born 1964), American-born Russian activist and neo-Nazi affiliate
- Frederick Bausman (born 1825), early coal mining operator in Allegheny County, Pennsylvania
- Frederick Bausman (judge) (1861–1931), justice of the Washington Supreme Court
- Karen Bausman (born 1958), American architect

== See also ==
- Bausman Mine, 19th-century coal mine in the Pittsburgh area
- Bausman, Pennsylvania, unincorporated community in Lancaster County, Pennsylvania
