= Russia Insider =

Russian propaganda website

- Website type: News and opinion
- Available in: English, Russian
- Founder: Charles Bausman
- Editors: Charles Bausman, David Curry and Riley Waggaman
- Website: russia-insider.com
- Advertising: Yes
- Commercial: Yes
- Registration: Optional
- Launched: September 2014; 12 years ago
- Current status: Active

Russia Insider is a news website that was launched in September 2014 by American expatriates living in Russia. The website describes itself as providing an alternative to how Russia is portrayed in the Western media. Other sources have described it as being "pro-Russian," "pro-Kremlin", advocating and pushing antisemitism and featuring false or misleading content.

== Foundation and funding ==
Russia Insider was founded in 2014 by Charles Bausman, an expatriate who had lived in Moscow for nearly 30 years and had been dissatisfied with what he perceived as the Western media's coverage of the Russia-Ukraine crisis. (Note: Charles Bausman (born 1963 or 1964) is the son of Evelyn Bausman (died August 2018) and Jack Bausman (1924, Lancaster, Pennsylvania, - 9 June 2016, Stamford, Connecticut), who graduated from Harvard in 1950, became a reporter for the Associated Press for forty years during the Cold War and was the bureau chief in Moscow for four years beginning July 1968 covering Richard Nixon's trip to Moscow from 22–30 May 1972 during détente. Charles Bausman visited the Soviet Union as a child during his father's time as a reporter in the USSR. Raised in Greenwich, Connecticut, he graduated from Phillips Exeter Academy, Wesleyan University with a degree in history and attended Columbia University studying business. He is a fluent Russian speaker. After graduation in the late 1980s, he moved to Russia and was an expatriate living in Russia for nearly thirty years where he worked briefly for NBC News and worked for several Russian private equity firms in agribusinness with Russians who "were the forerunners of the oligarchs," but filed for bankruptcy in 1999. In 2012, he was a director of investor relations with the agribusiness firm AVG Capital Partners. Until 2018, he was a regular commentator on RT (formerly Russia Today). Following the January 6 putsch at which he claimed he attended as a journalist covering the event, he allegedly fled from the United States and relocated to Russia where Konstantin Malofeev had Bausman appear on Tsargrad TV several times. His older sister Mary-Fred Bausman-Watkins died in May 2022. He has a brother. His wife Kristina Bausman is from Mednogorsk.) Bausman described the website as "citizen journalism" and stated that it has no relation to and is not funded by the Russian government. Its deputy editor is Riley Waggaman and its director of operations and human resources is David Curry.

In late 2015, Ukrainian writer and political activist Anton Shekhovtsov who investigates the European radical right and its connections to Russia, asserted that Bausman had sought funding from Russian oligarch Konstantin Malofeev, who is reportedly close to the Kremlin, citing emails leaked by Anonymous International in which Alexey Komov acted as an intermediary. In an article for Haaretz in January 2018, Shekhovtsov wrote that the website was "originally launched to attack Ukraine after its former president Viktor Yanukovych was ousted and fled to Russia, by accusing the new Ukrainian authorities of fascism and anti-Semitism".

Writing for ThinkProgress in 2018, Casey Michel similarly asserted that "a series of leaked emails showed site founder and editor Charles Bausman requesting funding from Konstantin Malofeev. [...] As Bausman wrote to one of Malofeev's associates, 'I still need money!!'" The solicitation to Malofeev was cited as evidence of Russia Insider's connection to the European far-right. The website itself has said it is dependent on crowdfunding, indicating that from 2014 to January 2018 it had received $300,000. The Daily Beast has said Bausman denies receiving money from Russian oligarchs.

== Assessment ==
The website has been criticized for its pro-Kremlin stance, accused of being among "pro-Kremlin propaganda sites" by Newsweek, and called "pro-Kremlin" by BBC News and the Slate website, being further accused of disseminating "false or misleading content" by the RAND Corporation. It is considered by the Euractiv website to be alongside "several highly visible partisan outlets such as RT (formerly Russia Today), Ruptly and Sputnik". Russia Insider is also known for posting the same content as clarityofsignal.com and RT. Bausman has himself been invited to speak on Russian state owned TV Russia-1 and RT.

Russia Insider has been considered to have right bias and mixed factual reporting. An article by Michael Edison Hayden for the Southern Poverty Law Center (SPLC) website in September 2021 described Russia Insider as being "infused with overtly fascist and antisemitic content."

== Antisemitic articles ==
On January 15, 2018, Russia Insider published an editorial by Bausman entitled "It's Time to Drop the Jew Taboo" in which he described the hostility to Putin's Russia as "largely a Jewish phenomenon", alleged a "strict taboo in the media of criticizing Jews as a group, and announced that "from now on, the pages of Russia Insider will be open to articles which fairly and honestly address the influence of Jewish elites, including pointing out when it is malevolent, which it often is". He claims that the red terror was a Jewish pogrom against the Russian people. Haaretz said the manifesto alleged "Jewish pressure groups" were responsible for "most of the deadly turmoil in the world over the last 30 years".

Vladislav Davidzon, contributing to the American Tablet magazine, described the article as "a lengthy anti-Semitic manifesto" writing that the article "contained a comprehensive litany of the most vile accusations against Jews dating back more than one hundred years". Another Tablet writer, Yair Rosenberg, said on Twitter: "This pro-Putin site's manifesto is basically a Nazi screed in 2018. It reads exactly the same way: 'We must go after the Jews or we will face societal calamity'." The article has been translated into several languages and has reportedly been described by the American white nationalist Richard B. Spencer as "a major event."

RT issued a statement on January 20, 2018, in response to the controversy: "RT categorically and unequivocally condemns the disgusting hate speech promoted by the recent Russia Insider article, its author, and the platform as a whole, and rejects any association to such". RT asserted the station had blacklisted Bausman two years earlier. Russia Insider has reproduced RT content. When asked by The Daily Beast, Google said "when a copyright holder notifies us of a video that infringes their copyright, we remove the content promptly in accordance with the law". RT material remained on the Russia Insider website.

In 2020, the SPLC found Russia Insider shared the same Google Analytics account as National-Justice.com (National Justice) and Truthtopowernews.com (Truth to Power News), the later founded by Bausman in early 2020. All of these websites share the same domain name which is mentioned near the end of their source code and possess by-lines in common with The Right Stuff, a White Nationalist website.

== See also ==
- Antisemitism in Russia
- Media of Russia
- Racism in Russia
