= Coincidence detector =

Coincidence detector or coincidence detection can refer to:

- Coincidence circuit, a device that can detect simultaneous electric signals
- Coincidence detection in neurobiology, the detection of temporally close but spatially distributed input signals
- Coincidence Detector (app), a web browser extension which automatically highlight names of individuals of Jewish background.
