= Konstantin Malofeev =

Russian businessman (born 1974)

- Константин Малофеев
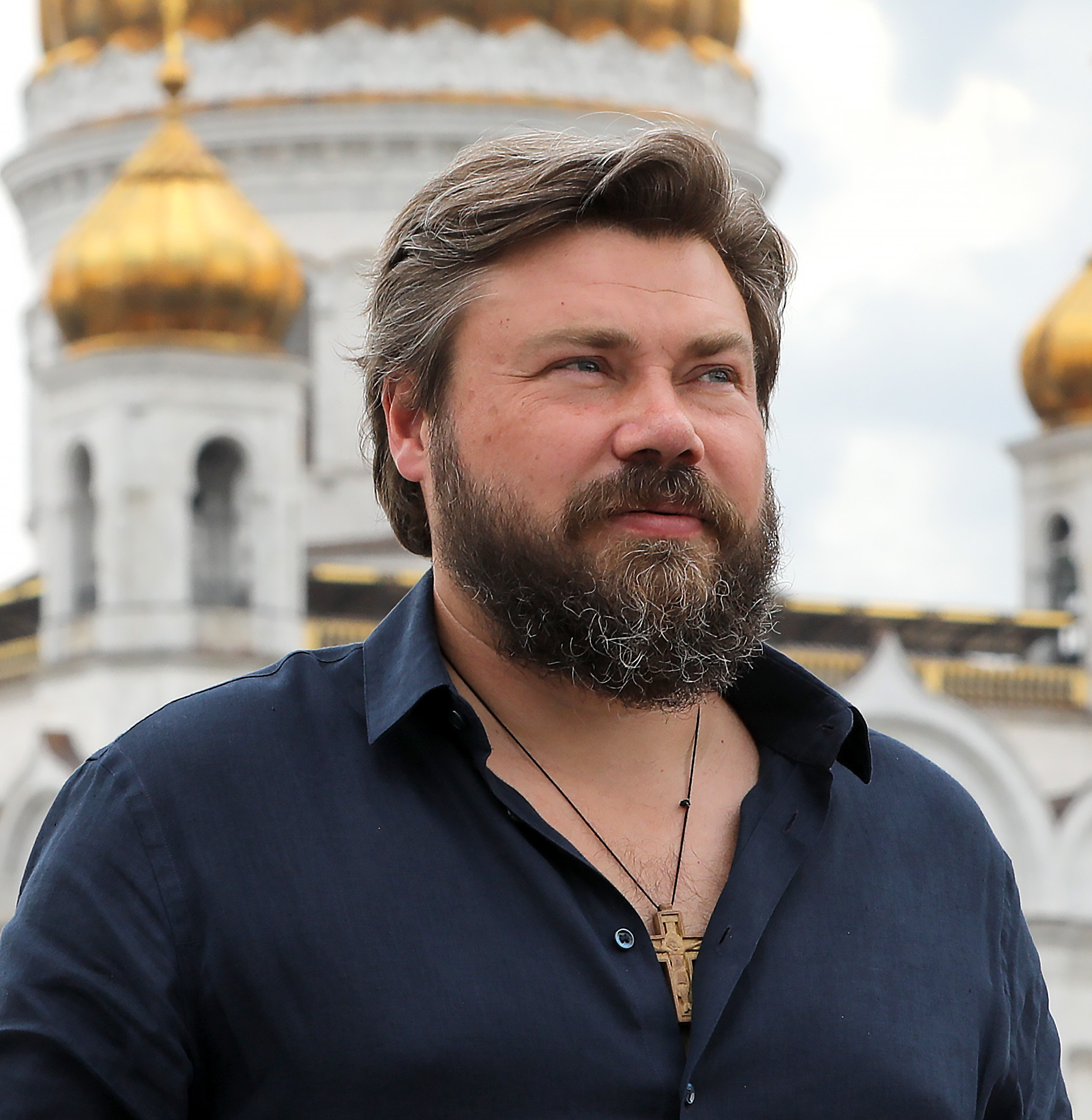
- Malofeev in 2020
- Born: 3 July 1974 (age 52); Pushchino, Russian SFSR, Soviet Union
- Education: Moscow State University
- Occupation: Businessman
- Known for: Chairman of Tsargrad TV
- Board member of: Tsargrad TV; Double-Headed Eagle Society
- Spouse: Irina Vilter
- Children: 3

Konstantin Valeryevich Malofeev (Russian: Константин Валерьевич Малофеев, born 3 July 1974) is a Russian media mogul and the chairman of the non-governmental and pro-monarchist organisation called the Society for the Development of Russian Historical Education "Double-Headed Eagle". He is the chairman of the media group Tsargrad, dedicated to Russian Orthodox Christianity and supporting Russian president Vladimir Putin. He is a co-founder of the international investment fund Marshall Capital Partners, member of the board of trustees of the non-profit organization Safe Internet League and chairman of the Saint Basil the Great Charitable Foundation.

== Early life and education ==
Malofeev was born on 3 July 1974, in the town of Pushchino in the Moscow Oblast where he attended school and art college. In 1996, he graduated with a law degree from Moscow State University. His father Valery Mikhailovich is an astrophysicist and head of the laboratory for the Department of Plasma Astrophysics at the Pushchino Radio Astronomy Observatory. His mother Raisa Zinurovna is a programmer and general director of the St. Basil the Great Charitable Foundation of which Malofeev is the chairman.

In the early 1990s, Malofeev, Alexander Provotorov (born 7 November 1974, Moscow), and Dmitry Skuratov, who is Yuri Skuratov's son and was two years younger in his studies than Malofeev and, through his sister Alexandra Yurievna Skuratova (born 18 August 1981), is the brother in law of Provotorov, were all close friends at Moscow State University. After graduation both Provotorov and Malofeev worked together at Renaissance Capital until its default in 1998. In June 2013, Dmitry Skuratov became the managing director of the Malofeev associated Marshall Capital Partners fund.

== Career ==
Malofeev began his career in 1996 in the investment bank Renaissance Capital and after it held various senior positions with Interros, MDM Bank and other investment banks and groups. From 2002 to 2004, he was the Head of Corporate Finance at MDM Bank, a leading Russian investment bank where he successfully built-up the bank's mergers and acquisitions practice.

Founded in 2005 by Malofeev, Marshall Capital is a Russian investment group focusing on equity and direct investments in telecommunications, media and technology, as well as real estate and agriculture. Late in 2014, Marshall Capital passed under the management of the fund CFG Capital (France), a private European investor focused on investment projects in Russia and the CIS. The partnership agreement created a joint business CFG Marshall with the overall size of the planned investments of more than €2 billion.

On 10 February 2009, Malofeev, who allegedly was countering the influences of Alisher Usmanov by acting as the money man supporting the interests of Igor Shchyogolev through Malofeev's Marshall Capital, became a member of the Board of Directors of Svyazinvest OJSC while it was closely associated with Igor Shchyogolev, when Shchogolev was the Director of the Information Department of the Ministry of Telecom and Mass Media of the Russian Federation from 2008 to 2012, and which led to the union of Svyazinvest with Rostelecom. (Note: Allegedly, Arseny Mironov (Russian: Арсений Станиславович Миронов; born 8 February 1973, Lubny, Poltava Oblast, Ukrainian Soviet Socialist Republic, USSR) insured that Igor Shchogolev became acquainted with Malofeev who was a childhood friend of Mironov.) (Note: Anton Khozyainov (Russian: Антон Алексеевич Хозяинов; born on 14 October 1974), who was a former Senior Vice President of Rostelecom OJSC and through him allegedly Rostelecom's financial flows passed as he allegedly was Alexander Provotorov's "wallet" and the executor of schemes send budget funds to the accounts of companies whose beneficiary was Provotorov.)

Malofeev is the chairman of the board of directors of Tsargrad (Imperial City), a platform used by such people as conspiracy theorist Alex Jones and far-right political analyst Aleksandr Dugin. Malofeev is also the president of and a supervisory board member of Tsargrad's affiliated think tank Katehon (Russian: Катехон). In 2016, a non-profit foundation in Moscow was established for the Eurasian Dialogue (Russian: «Евразийский диалог») with support from Konstantin Malofeev's Analytical Center Katehon (Russian: «Аналитический центр «Катехон») and Andrey Klimov's Interdisciplinary Institute for Regional Studies (MIRI) (Russian: «Межотраслевой институт региональных исследований» («МИРИ»)) which Klimov's wife Olga is a co-owner. Additionally, Malofeev has ties to the American religious right. He hired former Fox News employee Jack Hanick to help launch Tsargrad TV. (Note: Through Malofeev, Steve Bannon allegedly sees Aleksandr Dugin as an ally against liberalism.)

With French businessman and eurosceptic politician Philippe de Villiers, Malofeev plans to build two Russian history related theme parks; one in Moscow and one in Yalta.

He is the founder of the largest Russian private foundation, St. Basil the Great Charitable Foundation and a member of the board of trustees of the January 2011 established non-profit partnership "Safe Internet League" (a Russian non-governmental organization created to censor so-called "dangerous Internet content"), and the Chairman of the supervisory board of College St. Basil the Great, founded by him in 2007.

Konstantin Malofeev has faced multiple legal actions and sanctions due to his alleged involvement in violating U.S. and EU sanctions. In April 2022, the U.S. indicted him for conspiring to evade sanctions by financing pro-Russian media networks. His assets were seized as part of enforcement actions. The EU also sanctioned him for activities undermining Ukrainian sovereignty.

In response to the 2026 Iran war initiated by the Trump administration, Malofeyev suggested that U.S. actions pose a significant security threat to both Russian and European interests.

== Politics ==
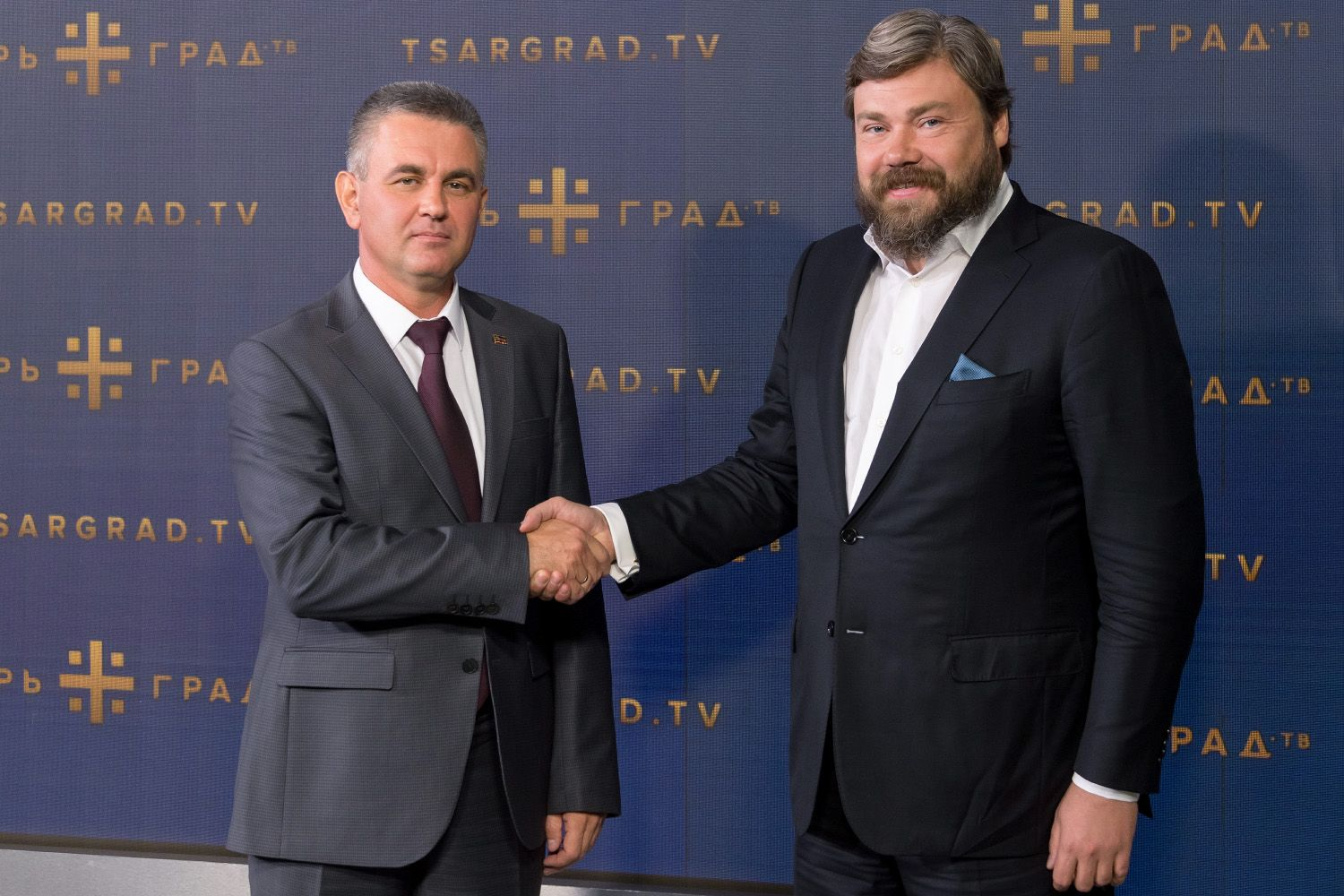
Malofeev with Transnistrian President Vadim Krasnoselsky in 2019

On 17 October 2012, Malofeev announced his candidacy and on 18 November was elected to the Council of Deputies of Znamenskoye Rural Settlement of Ugransky District in Smolensk Oblast, winning a majority of the vote (74.85%). His election took place despite the Vyazem regional court in Smolensk having annulled Malofeev's candidacy and removed him from the ballot on charges of electoral corruption. The court concluded that Malofeev had offered to pay 500 roubles for each vote committed to him.

== Legal issues ==
In 2007, VTB Capital plc, a subsidiary of VTB Bank began a legal case against Marshall Capital and Malofeev concerning a loan by "Russagroprom" Ltd. of US$225 million for the purchase of six dairy plants and three associated companies from "Nutritek". VTB Capital questioned the accuracy of the valuation of the dairy plants and the relationship between Marshall Capital and Malofeev, with both Russagroprom and Nutritek, asking the Court to place a world freezing order on Malofeev's assets. In turn, VTB Capital's own due diligence procedures prior to the acquisition were brought under scrutiny.

In a Judgment at the Supreme Court of the United Kingdom on 6 February 2013, Marshall Capital and Malofeev were fully acquitted of all allegations made by VTB Capital. VTB Capital was also criticised by the judge for its due diligence practices and its "apparent failures" and "inappropriate ... protracted wrongful continuation" of its world freezing order.

In July 2014, Ukraine opened a criminal case against Malofeev; he was accused of financing "illegal military groups" in Eastern Ukraine who at the time fought against the Ukrainian army.

On 12 February 2015, Russian law enforcement searched apartments of Malofeev and his business partner Dmitry Skuratov related to the VTB case.

=== International sanctions ===
Since 2014, Malofeev and his companies are designated to the lists of individuals sanctioned during the 2014 pro-Russian unrest in Ukraine maintained by the European Union, United States, and Canada

In September 2019, the Bulgarian government banned him from entering the country for ten years over an alleged spying conspiracy aimed at turning the country away from its pro-Western orientation and further toward Moscow.

In April 2022, the United States Department of Justice indicted Malofeyev on the charge of evading IEEPA sanctions.

=== John "Jack" Hannick ===
Allegedly, John "Jack" Hannick, who was a former Fox News producer that helped Malofeev establish Tsargrad TV, supported Malofeev's interests by evading sanctions.

== Involvement in the war in Donbas ==
The European Union, the United States and Ukraine have accused Malofeev of trying to destabilize and financing separatism in Ukraine. According to EU Regulation No 826/2014 from 30 July 2014, Malofeev is closely linked to Russian separatists in Eastern Ukraine and Crimea. He was the former employer of Alexander Borodai, the Prime Minister of the self-proclaimed Donetsk People's Republic. Malofeev was also former employer of Igor Girkin, a former FSB colonel who provided security services to Malofeev's visits to Kyiv and Crimea in the weeks before the annexation of the latter by Russia.

Igor Girkin later reappeared as the leader of the separatist insurgency in the town of Slovyansk, and subsequently as the self-proclaimed Minister of Defense of the self-proclaimed Donetsk People's Republic. In May 2014, during the separatists' occupation of Slovyansk led by Girkin, the Ukrainian security services SBU intercepted a phone call, in which a person with the same first and patronymic names as Malofeev's, and a voice similar to his own, provides tactical military intelligence to Girkin and praises him for a recent ambush attack on Ukrainian anti-terrorism troops.

In February 2015, the Russian investigative newspaper Novaya Gazeta published a document, which the newspaper alleged was a strategy for fomenting unrest in, and annexing Crimea, as well as other areas in South-Eastern Ukraine. The newspaper's editor-in-chief has publicly stated that the unnamed sources which leaked the alleged strategy, have informed the paper that Malofeev and his team had authored the document in February 2014. Also in 2014 hacker group Shaltay Boltay published leaked emails of George Gavrish, a nationalist closely cooperating with Alexander Dugin, suggesting a wide range of financial support flowing from Malofeev's conservative funds to radical nationalist political movements in Europe. In May 2014, Malofeev organized a meeting in Vienna with FPÖ, Ataka and Front National. A majority of that funding is funneled through the Saint Basil the Great Charitable Fund operated by Malofeev.

While all of Malofeev's initiatives in Ukraine were, formally, privately organized and funded, intercepted phone calls between him and his lieutenants on the ground in Ukraine, as well as hacked email correspondence, showed that he closely coordinated his actions with the Kremlin, at times via the powerful Orthodox priest Bishop Tikhon whom Malofeev and Putin (in their own words) share as spiritual adviser; at other times via direct coordination between Malofeev and Putin's advisers Vladislav Surkov and Sergey Glazyev, but also via Malofeev's close collaboration with the Kremlin-owned Russian Institute for Strategic Studies (RIIS), chaired by former KGB/SVR General Leonid Reshetnikov. In addition, a recent email hack suggests that at least one employee of Malofeev's participated in non-public sessions of the Russian government.

== Personal life ==
Malofeev was married to Irina Mikhailovna Vilter, a lawyer at Monastyrsky, Zyuba, Stepanov & Partners. They have three children: Kirill (born 1995), Natalia (born 1999), and Tatiana (born 2011).

Malofeev is the orthodox godfather of the children of Igor Shchyogolev who is the former Minister of Communications, an alleged KGB officer and now adviser to Vladimir Putin as his internet czar.

In 2024, he was reported to be in a romantic relationship with Maria Lvova-Belova, the Presidential Commissioner for Children's Rights in Russia, whom the International Criminal Court issued an arrest warrant for over her alleged role in the deportation of Ukrainian children to Russia during the Russo-Ukrainian War. The two reportedly married at the Villa Rotunda (Russian: Вилла Ротонда) restaurant, which is one of the most expensive wedding venues in the Moscow region, in the elite village of Deauville (Odintsovo district) (Russian: Довиль (Одинцовский район)) (Note: Deauville (Odintsovo district) (Russian: Довиль (Одинцовский район)) was formerly a NKVD dacha and a departmental rest house of the Central Committee of the CPSU in the Yudinsky rural district (Russian: Юдинский сельский округ) which existed from 1994 to 2006.) in Moscow Oblast on Natalia's Day (Note: (Russian: Натальиного дня, или попросту Наталья Овсяница)) or 8 September 2024.

== Social activity ==
Malofeev is involved in a number of projects, providing funding, both personally and through Marshall Capital.

In January 2007, Malofeev co-founded St. Basil the Great Grammar School, providing traditional Russian schooling.

In July 2007, he established the Russian Society of Philanthropists for the Protection of Mothers and Children. One of the society's initial programmes, The Heart of the Child, funds treatment for children with congenital heart defects in specialist Russian clinics.

In June 2010, the Society was renamed the Charitable Foundation of St Basil the Great. Its focus is to improve children's health, develop education and training, as well as constructing, restoring and financially supporting the development and growth of the Russian Orthodox Church. The Foundation is involved in over 30 programmes across Russia including support for the relocation of the children of Donbass and other displaced Ukrainian children due to the Russo-Ukrainian War.

Since 2011, Malofeev has been chairman of the board of Saint Basil the Great Charitable Foundation and member of the board of trustees of the "Safe Internet League" non-profit partnership which created the original draft of Internet censorship law in Russia.

In May 2014, he hosted an assembly of European conservatives and anti-gay supporters in Vienna.

== See also ==
- GRU Unit 29155
