= Charles Bausman =

American expatriate and Russian Propagandist (born 1963)

- Born: 1964 (age 61–62); Greenwich, Connecticut, U.S.
- Education: Columbia University
- Spouse: Kristina Bausman

Charles Bausman (born 1964) is a Russian activist, and American expatriate previously living in Russia. He is a publisher of Russia Insider, an antisemitic website that portrays itself as an alternative to Western narratives of news.

Bausman has connections with neo-Nazi group The Right Stuff and attended the January 6 United States Capitol attack. Bausman moved to Russia as a self-proclaimed political refugee following January 6 attack. He makes regular appearances on Russian State media.

== Early life and education ==
Charles Bausman, born 1964, was raised in Greenwich, Connecticut, he graduated from Phillips Exeter Academy, Wesleyan University with a degree in history and attended Columbia University studying business. Charles Bausman visited the Soviet Union as a child during his father's time as a reporter in the USSR.

== Expatriate in Russia ==
After graduation in the late 1980s, Charles Bausman lived in Russia for nearly thirty years where he worked briefly for NBC News. Bausman worked for several Russian private equity firms in agribusinness with Russians who "were the forerunners of the oligarchs," but filed for bankruptcy in 1999.

In 2018 Bausman moved to Lancaster, Pennsylvania with enough money to purchase property in cash. These properties were later abandoned when Bausman returned to Russia after the January 6th Capitol riot. Bausman has now returned to Lancaster PA.

== Russian Insider ==
Russia Insider was founded by Charles Bausman in 2014; Bausman told BuzzFeed News there was "a demand among the reading public for a view of news about Russia that wasn't so critical," and that the site reflected the founders' own views. It is recognized by many as a source of Russian propaganda.

According to leaked emails, Bausman sought to fund the website through Russian oligarchs. Bausman through Alexy Komov had asked Konstantin Malofeev to fund the website. Komov wrote to Malofeev

Charlie, however, has created a good website – .http://russia-insider.com/en – a high-quality, pro-Russian and popular one. He wants to cooperate..."

=== Antisemitic Articles ===
On January 15, 2018, Russia Insider published an editorial by Bausman entitled "It's Time to Drop the Jew Taboo" in reference to the Jewish question. RT then publicly denounced Charles Bausman and Russia Insider on January 20, 2018.

== Political Activism in the United States ==
After being blacklisted by RT for two years Charles Bausman returned to the United States of America and, paying with cash, bought property in the state of Pennsylvania. From these properties Bausman engaged in suspicious activities around neo-Nazis, a religious cult, COVID-19 protests in the United States, the 2020 United States presidential election, and Stop the Steal.

=== Neo-Nazi Activity ===
Charles Bausman is known to have connections to neo-Nazi groups in the United States. In 2016 he attended the National Policy Institute conference organized by Richard Spencer. Emails indicate that Bausman tried to plan a similar conference in Russia. Emails reveal that funding for Bausman's neo-Nazi conference attendance and planning came from Komov through the St. Basil the Great Charitable Foundation.

While he was living in Russia, his property was used for neo-Nazi rallies. Bausman made connections with Michael Enoch and the neo-Nazi network The Right Stuff and is said to have attended a Black Lives Matter counter protest in Lancaster PA.

In August 2020 a rally was held on Bausman's property announcing National Justice Party which Mike Enoch Peinovich would lead.

=== Lancaster Patriot ===
Charles Bausman also created the Lancaster Patriot website which was mirrored to a website hosted in Russia. The main author of the website was Norman “Trey” Garrison, a white nationalist podcaster on Peinovich's The Right Stuff network. Garrison listed his address as one of Bausman's properties when the Texas Native was arrested in Lancaster.

Lancaster Patriot ceased publication after Garrison was identified as the main author. However a paper version was reported as circulating in May 2021 after Bausman's return to Russia.

=== Unification Church ===
The Rod of Iron Ministries formally known as World Peace and Unification Sanctuary hosted rallies on Charles Bausman's properties Three days before the January 6th attack on the US Capitol Bausman hosted the gun worshipping cult for a Trump fueled rally on his property.

Bausman is said to have met with the Church and other Stop the Steal advocates in a private meeting after the rally.

=== Covid Protests ===
As another role in American Politics Bausman helped to organize and promote the ReOpen PA, a COVID-19 protest and Facebook groups. He had used yard signs and attended events and protests.

=== Stop the Steal ===
Beyond planning and hosting protests with the Rod of Steele Ministries on his property Bausman also encouraged people online to attend protests. A secret meeting of insurrectionists were said to have met in Lancaster on January 3, 2001. Bausman was photographed entering the US Capitol.

== Personal life ==
Bausman is the son of Evelyn Bausman and Jack Bausman of Stamford, Connecticut. Through his mother, Bausman is the maternal great-grandson of Richard T. Greener, the first Black student to graduate from Harvard College, and his second wife Mishi Kawashima. Jack graduated from Harvard in 1950, became a reporter for the Associated Press for forty years during the Cold War and was the bureau chief in Moscow for four years beginning July 1968 covering Richard Nixon's trip to Moscow from 22 to 30 May 1972 during détente. His older sister Mary-Fred Bausman-Watkins died in May 2022. He has a brother. His wife Kristina Bausman is from Mednogorsk. Bausman was previously married to Olga Bausman.
