= Elena Sharoykina =

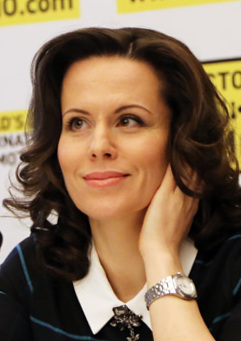

Elena Sharoykina (Russian: Шаройкина Елена Акинфовна, born 1979), is a Russian journalist, social communications and corporate consulting expert, environmental activist. She is director of the National Association for Genetic Safety (Moscow), and director of the Russian TV channel Tsargrad. Since 2020 she has been a Putin-appointed member of the Civic Chamber of the Russian Federation.

== Education and career ==
Sharoykina graduated from the faculty of journalism at Oles Honchar Dnipropetrovsk National University. Her main speciality is TV journalism. She started professional career in Ukraine as a parliamentary journalist and an author of several TV programs on political and social problems.

As a public relations specialist she has taken part in a number of election campaigns and humanitarian projects. In early 2000 she established her own company in Moscow, Production Ru Communication Group, which has since specialized in providing marketing, political and social communication services. United Russia party, the government of Khanty-Mansi Autonomous Okrug – UGRA, Financial corporation URALSIB, Rosenergomash, Russian Football Union, Media Holding New Media Stars and others, were among clients of the company. In 2006 'White Wing' prize was awarded to Production Ru Communication Group in "Best PR-project in the nonprofit sphere" nomination for the achievements of Kirsan Ilyumzhinov re-election campaign for the President of World Chess Federation (FIDE).

Since April 2016 Sharoykina has been director of the Russian TV channel Tsargrad TV.

== Public activity ==
In 2004, Sharoykina established the anti-GMO organization National Association for Genetic Safety (NAGS). Dr. Alexander Baranoff from Koltzov Institute of Developmental Biology of Russian Academy of Sciences was elected as president of NAGS. Sharoykina was appointed as director of NAGS.

In November 2014 Sharoykina became the main coordinator of the FACTOR GMO study, international project - touted to become the world's largest and most comprehensive study on GMOs' safety. The public was asked to donate US$ 25 million to fund the project. However, after a few months, the whole thing quietly disappeared, and was never heard of again.

Sharoykina regularly participates in working groups on environmental and food safety issues in the State Duma, Russian ministries and agencies. She takes part in news and analytical programs on federal TV channels, and gives lectures on ecology and food safety at different public premises (Central House of artists, Red October etc.).

Sharoykina is an author and a member of the editorial council of Science & Religion magazine, and a columnist for Russian newspapers Green City and Vzglyad.

She is alleged to be an important player in Russian propaganda activities against Ukraine.

She is a member of the Public Control Development Council in the Committee on Public and Religious Organizations in the State Duma.

== Lobbying ==
According to some assessments, Sharoykina has played a key role in lobbying for anti-GMO laws in Russia. Critics also claim that she was acting with the help of powerful government institutions of Russia behind her lobbying activities.
