= Bausman Farmstead =

- U.S. National Register of Historic Places
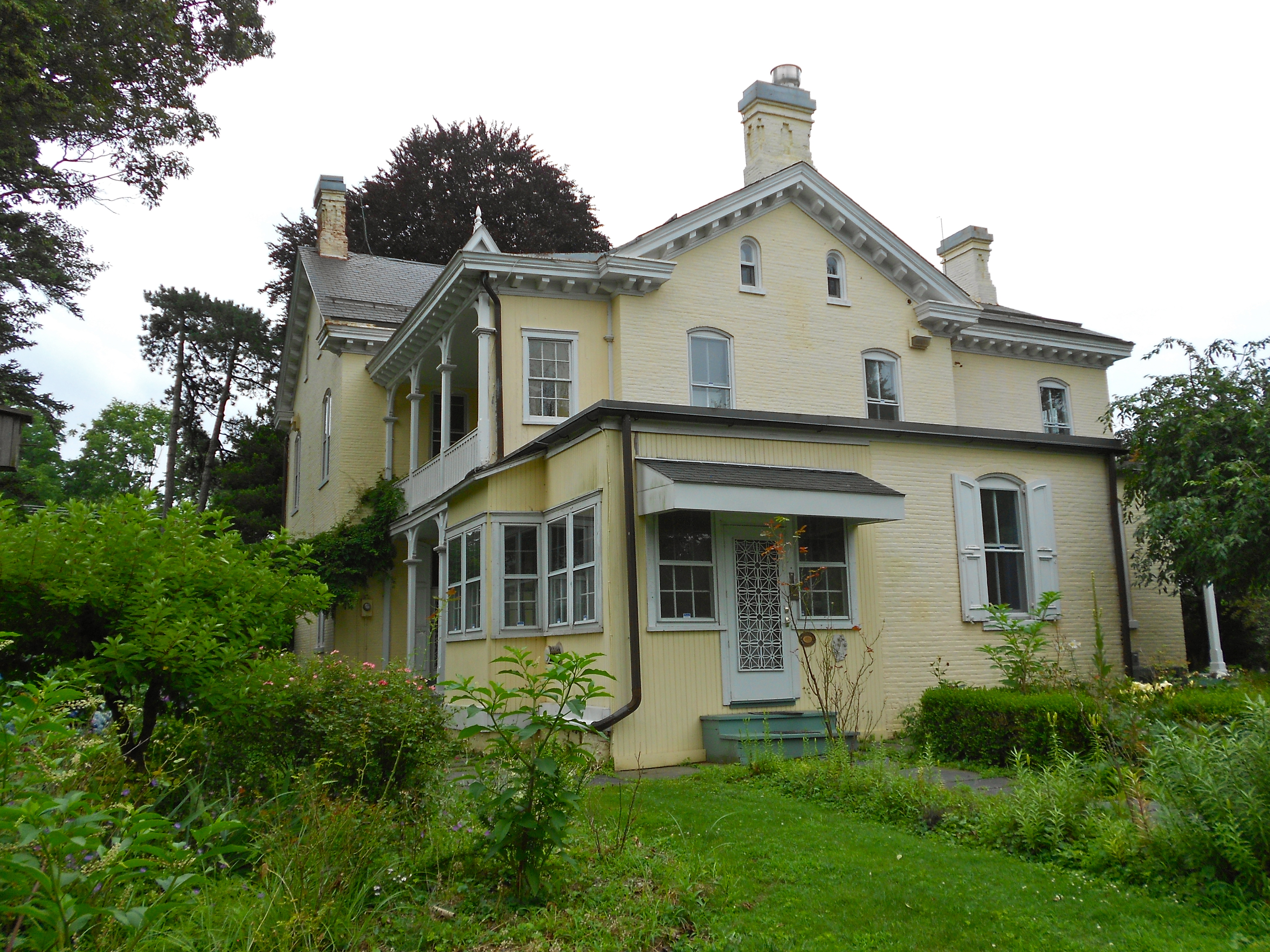
- Bausman Mansion from the rear

- Location within Pennsylvania Location within the United States
- Location: 1630 and 1631 Millersville Pike, Lancaster Township, Pennsylvania
- Coordinates: 40°1′17″N 76°20′1″W
- Area: 6 acres (2.4 ha)
- Built: 1775, 1836, 1879
- Architectural style: Federal, Late Victorian, Pennsylvania barn
- MPS: Historic Farming Resources of Lancaster County MPS
- NRHP reference No.: 94001061
- Added to NRHP: August 30, 1994

Bausman Farmstead is a historic home and farm located at Lancaster Township, Lancaster County, Pennsylvania.

== Description and history ==
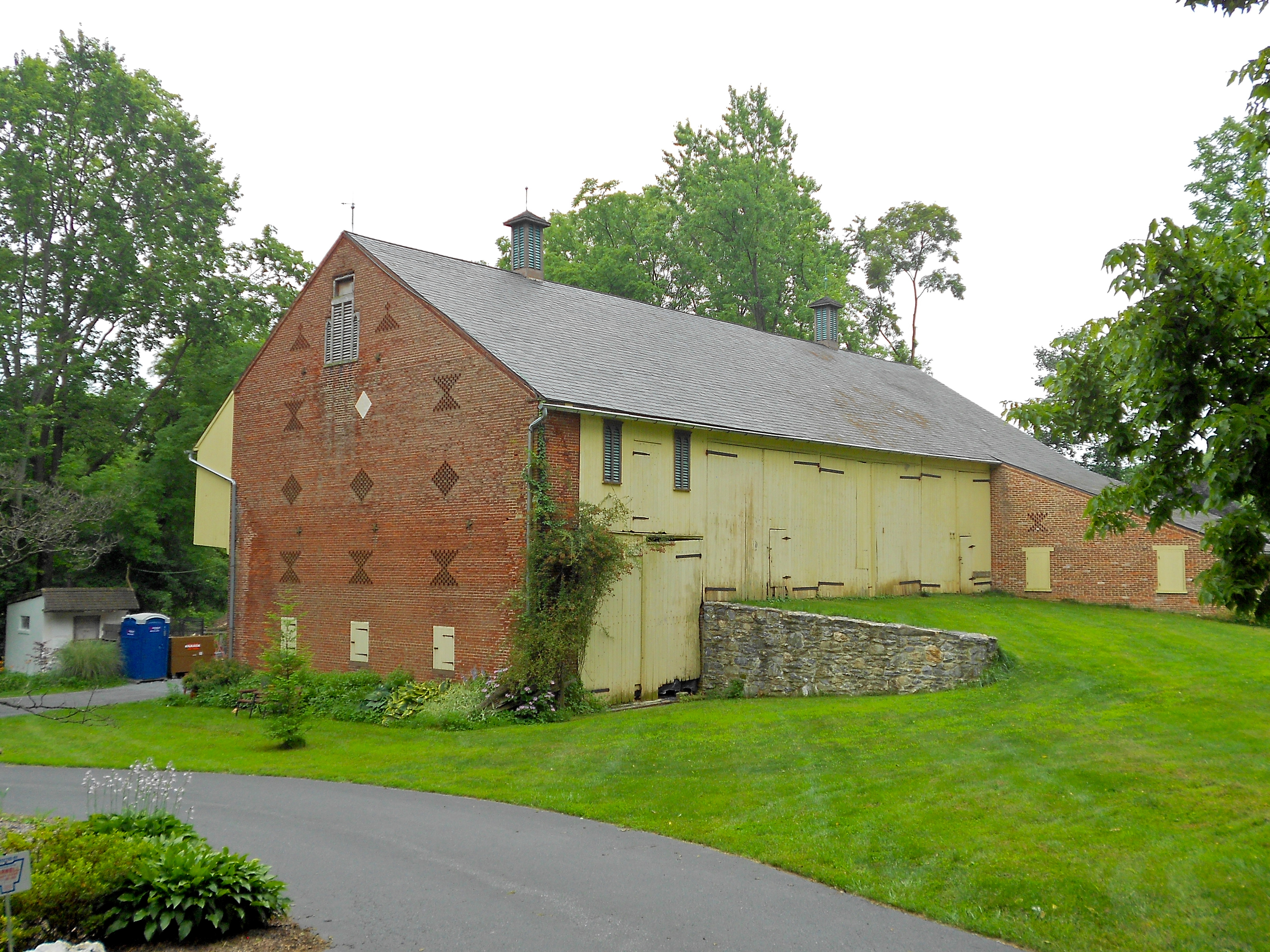
Barn

The farmstead was built by German immigrant Andreas Bausman, after his arrival in Pennsylvania in 1755.

The complex includes a brick dwelling with summer kitchen, bank barn, stone still house, and Bausman Mansion. The brick farmhouse is a 1 1/2-story, four bay wide brick dwelling with a 2-story rear ell built in 1836. The summer kitchen is attached to the west of the rear wing and attached by a brick infill section. The brick bank barn was built in 1869. The stone still house is dated to 1775. The Bausman Mansion was built in 1879, and is a 2 1/2-story, brick dwelling in the Late Victorian style.

It was listed on the National Register of Historic Places in 1994.

In 2020 property was bought by Russia Insider editor Charles Bausman, whose ancestors owned the farmstead.
