= Pushchino =

Town in Moscow Oblast, Russia

Pushchino Пущино
- Town
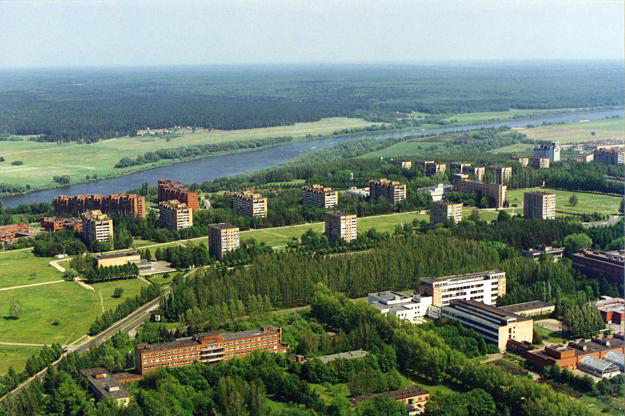
- Pushchino from the air

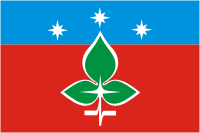
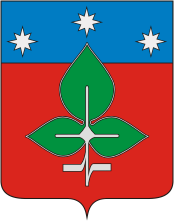
- Flag Coat of arms
- Interactive map of Pushchino
- Location of Pushchino Pushchino (Moscow Oblast)
- Coordinates: 54°50′N 37°37′E
- Country: Russia
- Federal subject: Moscow Oblast
- Known since: 16th century
- Town status since: 1966
- Elevation: 190 m (620 ft)

Population (2010 Census)
  - Total: 20,332
  - Estimate (2025): 19,229 (−5.4%)

Administrative status
  - Subordinated to: Pushchino Town Under Oblast Jurisdiction
  - Capital of: Pushchino Town Under Oblast Jurisdiction

Municipal status
  - Urban okrug: Pushchino Urban Okrug
  - Capital of: Pushchino Urban Okrug
- Time zone: UTC+3 (MSK)
- Postal code: 142290
- OKTMO ID: 46770000011
- Website: www.pushchino.ru

Pushchino (Russian: Пущино, IPA: [ˈpuɕːɪnə]) is a town in Moscow Oblast, Russia, an important scientific center of the Russian Academy of Sciences. Situated 100 kilometers (62 mi) south of Moscow, and 13 km south-east of Serpukhov, on the right side of the Oka River opposite the Prioksko-Terrasny Nature Reserve. It is informally called Pushchino-on-Oka. Population: 20,332 (2010 census); 19,964 (2002 census); 19,479 (1989 Soviet census).

Pushchino Research Center of Russian Academy of Sciences has unique status and significance. It hosts a major component of Russian Federation endeavor in the fields of physical, chemical, and bio-molecular biology. It employs more than 3000 people, of whom 800 hold doctorates in science or medicine. Pushchino scientists have made seminal contributions to molecular and cell biology, bio-organic chemistry, plant and soil biology, as well as to astronomy and astrophysics - including the discovery of the solar supercorona and radial magnetic fields within it, and the discovery of radio recombination lines of highly excited atoms.

== History ==
The town takes its name from the village of Puschino, which was first mentioned in the 1579 records ('cadasters') of Ivan the Terrible as being a fiefdom of the Pushchin family. The modern town of Pushchino was founded in 1956 on the hill above the Oka River, some of the highest ground in the Moscow Region, to host the new Radio Astronomy Observatory, an important resource that continues to contribute to mapping of space flights. This was followed by the establishment of Pushchino as a Science City, focusing on biological sciences. It was granted town status in 1966.

Several mesolithic, neolithic, and Bronze Age settlements exist in the area around Pushchino. Dyakovo culture artifacts have been found on the outskirts of the modern town. An Iron Age hillfort dates back 2500 years. 1 km to the west of Pushchino on important Oka river ford in the 12th to 16th Centuries there stood the ancient Russian town of Teshilov (see), earthworks of which can be seen today.

At the end of the 18th century, a prominent country house was established overlooking the water at Pushchino, which for a time became the home of Alexander Alyabyev (1787–1851), an acclaimed composer. During World War II Axis tank divisions reached 20 km from Pushchino, and until 1970 the mansion served as a hospital. The mansion was the setting for the director N. Mikhalkov's 1974 film ‘An Unfinished Play for Mechanical Piano'. The Pushchino mansion is now in disrepair and the ruins are still an important tourist site. German infantry took Pushchino briefly.

== Development of Pushchino ==
The President of the USSR Academy of Science (Alexander Nesmeyanov, 1899-1980) advocated the formation of a biological research center equipped with the latest equipment and facilities. In 1955 the Council of Ministers established a special commission tasked to find a site in the Moscow region. By March 1956 two options were selected, both on the Oka River: at Tarusa, and the other at Pushchino. Given the proximity of Tarusa to Polenovo, an established cultural center, major new construction was deemed inappropriate, and in April 1956 it was decreed that a scientific campus would be constructed in the Moscow region, near the Pushchino village. The Russian Academy of Sciences was allotted a plot of land of 761.8 hectares for the construction of a scientific campus and radioastronomy station.

The structure of modern Pushchino was planned by scientists in the 1950s - two parallel roads, the residences, shops, and restaurants on the northerly road closer to the river, the institutes along the southerly road, and a large green zone and park between them.

First constructed was the Pushchino Radio Astronomy Observatory, which, at the time, had the world's largest radio telescope: a parabolic antenna in the form of a giant cup and a complex network of antennas with a kilometer strip.

During construction of the town transport access was provided along a low-level road adjoining the Oka river. Seasonal flooding regularly made this road impassable for weeks, and in 1965 a new highway was constructed along the edge of the plateau to link Pushchino with Serpukhov to the west. The first institute, the Institute of Biochemistry and Physiology of Microorganisms, led by Nikolai Dmitrievich Jerusalimski, was completed in 1969, followed by the Institute of Agricultural Chemistry and Soil Science.

Today Pushchino is among the top-ranking academic centers in Russia.

== Geography ==
Altitudes range from 104 m (beach of Oka) to 219 m on the plateau. The Oka river, one of the largest tributaries of the Volga, is a typical lowland river in the forest zone of the European part of Russia with a well-established valley. Special aspects of Oka are frequent spring and autumn floods and large fluctuations in levels. Its width at Pushchino on average is 150-200m and does not exceed 250 m, and the depth reaches 3.75 m. Average flow velocity is 0.25 m/s, mean volume 159 m³/s. Three rivers small at Pushchino make their way into the Oka: the Khokhla, the Neglyadeyka and the Lyubozhiha.

The banks of the Oka have carbon limestone outcrops on the surface, part of which is landslide blocks. In some places (the valley of the river Khokhla), limestone is covered with only a thin soil cover (15–20 cm). Karst is active at such places. Pushchino takes its water from artesian wells and the carbonate bedrock provides very calcium-rich groundwater. Glacial moraines cover the limestone at some distance from the river, while the floodplain of the Oka is fringed by remnants of late-Pleistocene sandy dunes on the surface of upper terraces. Thus, the relief of Pushchino is a preglacial elevated plateau, overlapped with Dnieper moraine and dismembered by deep erosion embedded to a depth of 130–140 m.

=== Climate ===
The climate is determined mainly by the impact of the transfer of air masses from the Atlantic Ocean, interrupted often by invasion of cold air masses from the Arctic in the rear of cyclones. In general, the climate of Pushchino is moderately continental, with moderately cold winters, warm summers and fairly stable humidity. In winter, invasions of the Atlantic cyclones are usual, which lead to frequent thaws and the rising of the temperature to 5-8 °C.

Average annual temperature is +3.9 °C, but in winter the temperature is commonly -20, the coldest recorded temperature being -44 °C. From Springtime onwards the temperature warms, with mid-20s to mid-30s being usual; the highest recorded temperature at Pushchino was 39 °C.

Average annual precipitation is 582 mm, most falling during the warm season (April to October: 394 mm, 70%), with 30% falling during the cold season (188 mm, 30%). Summer precipitation often takes the form of stormwater, leading to erosion of arable lands.

Snow in the winter comprises 20% of precipitation. Typically wide snow cover forms by late November, reaching a maximum height at the beginning of March (average 44 cm, 99 cm at maximum and 13 cm at minimum).

=== Forest, natural reserves and protected areas ===
The Oka river draws an approximate line between coniferous and deciduous forests. North of the Oka at Pushchino begins a mixed forest including spruce and birch that extends to Northern Russia. Pushchino itself and further south are characterized by broad-leaved forests, with a predominance of oak, linden, elm, ash, aspen, and without any admixture of spruce, before giving way to cultivated land. Near the river willow trees grow in dense thickets.

Pushchino City has an active conservation program - Ecopolis - that has identified several areas now subject to conservation measures. These include:

1. Lyubozhikha River Valley: a protected area is located at the foot of Pushchino hill. Wildlife species include nightingales, orioles, owls, and beavers.
2. Teshilov hillfort: a historical monument that is now subject to state preservation. It is located 700 meters from the river Lyubozhikha. Earthwork ramparts and moat are well preserved. In 1925 archeological excavations discovered a fortress on the site dating to the 12th century. The settlement was mentioned in Russian chronicles in 1147.
3. Khokhla River Valley: this protected area lies 2.5 km west of Lyubozhikha between the lower and upper roads to Serpukhov. This deep valley is renowned for its natural beauty, with dense forestation, meadow hills, limestone outcrops, and waterfalls. Rare flowers include forget-me-nots, anemones, gentians, and coronilla elfworts. The Zaoksky Forestry Commission reports an exceptional diversity of tree species; recent construction work imperils the reserve.
4. Entomological Meadow: this protected area is located in the south-western outskirts of the city and occupies a meadow on slope of the right tributary of the Lyubozhikha river (Solonovka creek). The name of the river shows its direction (the old Russian word "Sologne", "posolon" meaning "going behind the Sun", that is, from east to west). Until the 1930 this was the site of a village (Solonovka). The meadow slopes are a home to rare species of butterflies: the red and ordinary melitaea, small limenitis, chalkhill blue, Nordmannia spini, skippers and others.
5. Solonovsky Wood protected area: a deep ravine of Solonovka east from the Pushchino-Serpukhov road. "Gremyak" creek falls on limestone from high slope.
6. Birch Grove protected area: a pure birch forest on the Solonovka tributary south of Pushchino (the Endova site).
7. Oak Wood protected area: also known as Perlovskii Reserve, an area dominated by mature oak trees.
8. Neglyadeyka River Valley protected area: a narrow strip of forested slopes of the eastern tributary of the Oka at the eastern boundary of Puschino with villages of Balkovo and Mitinki.

== Administrative and municipal status ==
Within the framework of administrative divisions, it is incorporated as Pushchino Town Under Oblast Jurisdiction—an administrative unit with the status equal to that of the districts. As a municipal division, Pushchino Town Under Oblast Jurisdiction is incorporated as Pushchino Urban Okrug., and was officially recognized as a Science City of the Russian Federation in 2006.

== Science ==
Pushchino is an academic research center focusing on microbiology, molecular biology, biophysics, and astronomy. The town hosts a core group of key Research institutes and a University Institute:

- Institute of Basic Biological Problems
- Institute of Biochemistry and Physiology of Microorganisms
- Institute of Bio-Organic Chemistry, Pushchino Branch
- Institute of Cell Biophysics
- Institute of Mathematical Problems of Biology
- Institute of Protein Research
- Institute of Theoretical and Experimental Biophysics
- Pushchino Radioastronomy Observatory
- Pushchino State University, now the Pushchino State Institute of Natural Sciences, and a branch of Moscow State University

Pushchino hosts the annual Russia-wide 'Conference of Young Scientists'

== Culture ==
The prevailing religious culture is of Russian Orthodoxy, and a new church of Archangel Michael was completed in 1990. The School of Music, named after A. Alyabyev, has about 300 students, and Pushchino hosts the annual and widely renowned 'Song and Bard Festival'. The town facilities include Sport Palace Oka, ski training, and a rowing base 'Delphin' on the Oka. A focus for cultural life is the 'House of Scientists'.

== Notable people ==
- Konstantin Malofeev (born 1974), Russian businessman

== See also ==
- Pushchino Radio Astronomy Observatory
