= Mike Enoch =

American white supremacist blogger and podcast host (born 1977)

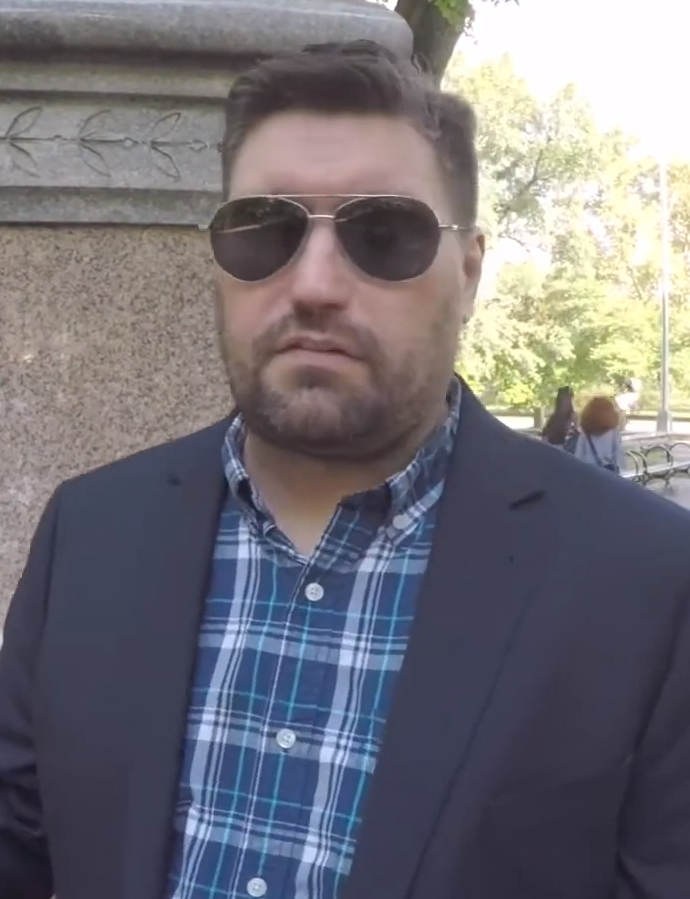
- Enoch in 2017
- Born: Michael Isaac Peinovich; 1977 (age 48–49)
- Presenting career
- Show: The Daily Shoah
- Style: Neo-Nazi, antisemitic, Holocaust denial
- Country: United States

Michael Enoch Isaac Peinovich (born 1977), more commonly known as Mike Enoch, is an American neo-Nazi, antisemitic conspiracy theorist, Holocaust denier, blogger, and podcast host. He founded the alt-right media network The Right Stuff and podcast The Daily Shoah. Through his work, Enoch ridicules African Americans, Jews, and other minorities, advocates racial discrimination, and promotes conspiracy theories such as Holocaust denial and white genocide.

In early 2017, while operating his antisemitic media network under his pseudonym, Enoch was doxxed by fellow neo-Nazis. Most notably, the dox revealed that the neo-Nazi Enoch was married to a Jewish woman, and that their wedding had featured traditional Jewish rites and chanting. According to Salon.com, prior to the dox, Enoch's wife had appeared as a guest on The Daily Shoah to promote antisemitic memes.

In addition to his founding of a neo-Nazi media network, Enoch has drawn attention for his role in organizing book burnings.

== Early life ==
Enoch was born as Michael Enoch Isaac Peinovich of Norwegian and Serbian descent. His mother was the president of the National Labour College, while his father was a professor of Old English at the University of Pennsylvania. His parents divorced when he was young. He grew up in Maplewood and Montclair in New Jersey. Enoch attended Columbia High School in Maplewood. While in high school, Enoch had jobs in pizza delivery and swimming pool sanitation. After graduating high school, he attended and dropped out of several universities before becoming a computer programmer who worked at an e-publishing company.

== Early media coverage ==
Enoch first drew media attention for his use of the "Sieg Heil" salute at a conference in 2016 organized by Richard B. Spencer to celebrate Donald Trump's election as president. The salutes were performed in front of journalists, and footage of the speech and the Enoch-inspired salutes was circulated by the mainstream media. According to Andrew Marantz, the event marginalized the alt-right by defining it to the public as a neo-Nazi movement, and led to an exodus of Trump supporters.

== The Right Stuff (blog) ==
The Right Stuff is a white nationalist, neo-fascist neo-Nazi blog founded by Enoch that hosts several podcasts, including The Daily Shoah and Fash the Nation. The blog is best known for popularizing the use of triple parentheses to identify Jews on social media. The Daily Shoah is a far-right podcast, hosted on TRS. Its name uses the Hebrew word referring to the Holocaust. The podcast also uses the triple parentheses symbol.

== Doxing incident ==
In January 2017, users of the imageboard website 8chan leaked the identities of several of its key contributors, including Enoch, and revealed that his wife was Jewish and that their wedding had featured traditional Jewish rites and chanting. According to Salon.com, prior to the dox, Enoch's wife had appeared as a guest on The Daily Shoah to promote antisemitic memes.

Other information released included the names of his family members, his job as a software developer, his home address on Manhattan's Upper East Side neighborhood, and his hometown of Maplewood, New Jersey. After initially attempting to deny the reports, Enoch later admitted that the allegations were true. Though Enoch initially planned to leave the network, he quickly changed his mind and vowed to continue his activities. However, the fact that the released biographical information about Enoch contradicted his professed ideology led many listeners of TDS to question the authenticity of Enoch's commitment to the views he espoused on the show.

== Personal life ==
Enoch was married to a Jewish woman whom he met when she was his supervisor at AOL. He said he married her despite her being Jewish because she did not have what he considered to be Jewish traits, which he said were "[t]he pushiness, this absolute inability to empathize with others, an exploitative personality".

In a 2017 audio statement released on their podcast, Daily Shoah co-host Seventh Son announced that Enoch and his wife were separating. The revelation was met with mixed but mostly supportive reactions from individuals including David Duke and Richard B. Spencer.

Enoch's father asked his son to change his surname because of his neo-Nazi political activities.

== Political activities ==
After U.S. Congressman Steve King tweeted praise for Netherlands political candidate Geert Wilders's stance against further immigration to Europe, Enoch joined other alt-right voices in approval of King's position, stating "King doubles down. Great job. Take note cucks, this is how you *actually* fight the left."

On 18 April 2017, Enoch joined Richard B. Spencer in giving a talk at Auburn University where he expressed that he and the movement were breaking away from the new direction that the Trump administration was taking. While Auburn administration had initially cancelled the planned event, citing safety concerns, Enoch assisted Spencer in filing a lawsuit on First Amendment grounds. United States federal judge William Keith Watkins issued a ruling requiring Auburn to allow Spencer and Enoch to speak.

In April 2018, he was retweeted by Ann Coulter following his dissemination of conspiracy theories relating to the Douma chemical attack in Syria claiming it was faked. After Newsweek asked Twitter for a comment, his account was suspended.

In addition to his founding of a neo-Nazi media network, Enoch has drawn attention for his role in organizing book burnings.

Peinovich was the chair of the National Justice Party, an antisemitic group that posted political demands on its website but had no actual party registration in the U.S. Following the 2023 attack on Israel by Hamas, Peinovich wrote "Hats off to the Palestinians for taking bold and courageous action in their own cause and showing us that the Zionist regime is not invincible."

== Legal issues ==
In October 2017, Enoch was listed as a defendant in Sines v. Kessler, the federal civil lawsuit against various organizers, promoters, and participants of the 2017 Unite the Right rally. The trial began on October 25, 2021, and the jury reached a verdict on November 23. All defendants other than Enoch, who had previously been dismissed from the case, were found liable for civil conspiracy under Virginia state law, and ordered to pay $500,000 in punitive damages. The jury were deadlocked on the two other claims pertaining to Enoch, which argued he and other defendants had engaged in a federal conspiracy to commit racially motivated violence.

== See also ==
- Antisemitism in the United States
- Criticism of multiculturalism
- Far-right politics in the United States
- Racism in the United States
- Radical right (United States)
