= Cuckservative =

Alt-right and white nationalist pejorative

"Cuckservative" is a pejorative formed as a portmanteau of "cuck", an abbreviation of the word "cuckold", and the political designation "conservative". It has become a derogatory label used by white nationalists and the alt-right in the United States to denigrate other conservatives, generally for being moderates, and later for not supporting white-nationalist interests.

The word "cuckservative" reached a high level of mainstream political conversation around mid-July 2015, where it gained media attention a few weeks before the start of the first Republican primary debate for the 2016 United States presidential election.

The term, as well as the shortened form "cuck" for cuckold, originated on websites such as 4chan (specifically the /pol/ imageboard) and 8chan, the right-wing message board My Posting Career, the blog The Right Stuff, and other sites associated with the alt-right.

== Definition and origin ==
One definition of "cuckservative" is someone who is associated with the right-wing politics in contemporary America but also opposes white supremacy. According to Richard B. Spencer, a white supremacist, the term is a shorthand used to express "a certain kind of contempt for conservatives".

Initially, the term was also used by social conservatives in a manner similar to "Republican in Name Only" (RINO) against conservatives who were seen as not conservative enough. Social conservatives use the term to condemn Republicans they accuse of running on socially conservative values to appeal to their base during an election cycle only to use vote trading to compromise on those values while in office and, thus, capitulate to liberal politicians and public sentiment.

The term "cuckold" has a long history as an insult implying that a specific man is weak and emasculated, and may even feel pleasure at his own humiliation. The shortened form "cuck" arose in this manner as an Internet insult, and it also refers to a genre of pornography in which a married woman spurns her weak husband for sex with a strong man. The husband is thus cuckolded or "cucked".

Some American political writers have suggested that the terms "cuck" and "cuckservative" are fetish-charged due to their pornographic roots, instead of simply being a sexual insult like the original "cuckold". Thus, "cuck" is said by various writers to project the insulter's own anxieties by insinuating that the target is weak or enjoys his humiliation. The term "cuckservative" is said to imply that certain Republicans are humiliated through their actions while feeling thrilled from their own degradation of others because of the "abandonment of their own moral standards".

White supremacists have used the term to condemn white politicians who they say unknowingly promote "the interests of Jews and non-whites". The Anti-Defamation League says that the term is used by white supremacists as a synonym of the pre-existing phrase "race traitors". Those in the self-described conservative media targeted by the "cuckservative" slur, as well as journalists and commentators from other media outlets, have decried the term as an anti-Christian, racist slur and a rallying cry for white supremacists and neoreactionaries.

Carlos Esteban from Spain's conservative news site La Gaceta translated "cuckservative" to cornuservador, stating that: "Republicans are nothing but the 'controlled opposition' completely in the hands of the political left, whose only aspiration is for those rare occasions when those hands pat them on the head, and the media rewards them with the coveted adjective 'moderate': these are the cornuservadores."

== Use ==
Jeet Heer of The New Republic wrote that the word is a "fine example of how the sound of a word can reinforce its meaning: abrasive on the ears, cuckservative appropriately enough has an ugly origin and meaning". The word was most popularly adopted in mid-2015 after some alt-right web users were disapproving of the attempts by John McCain, Jeb Bush, and other Republicans to establish more politically conservative positions, dubbing those who did "cuckservatives". Over a matter of weeks, the term then proceeded to attain usage additionally on social media and the wider internet.

Writing for Hot Air, Taylor Millard criticized the word and its history of usage by white supremacists on the political right. He called it short-sighted, giving his opinion that Rand Paul's popularity at leading majority-black universities could make African Americans more conservative in the future. Matt Lewis, in The Daily Beast, gave his opinion that the word could become as popular with Republicans as "RINO" (Republican In Name Only), even if they were oblivious to its often fetish connotations. Writing in The Washington Post, David Weigel described the term as arising from disaffected elements of the right wing.

== See also ==
- Beta male (slang)
- Criticism of neoconservatism
- Dog whistle (politics)
- Regressive left
- Rockefeller Republican
