= Leonid Petrovich Reshetnikov =

Soviet-Russian secret agent (born 1947)

Leonid Reshetnikov
- Леонид Решетников
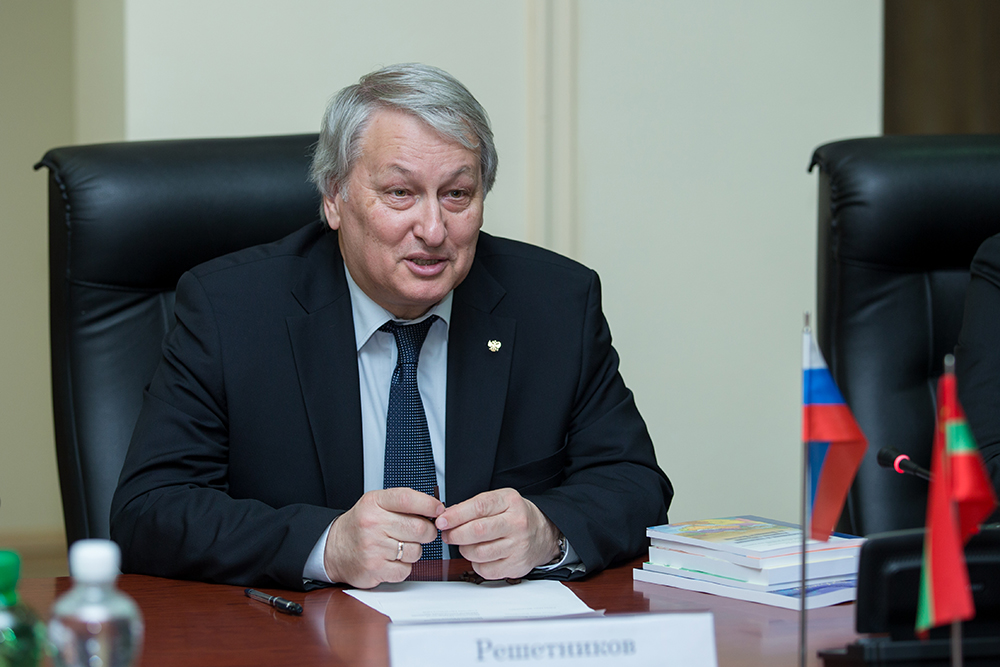
- Reshetnikov in 2014

Director of the Russian Institute for Strategic Studies
- In office 29 April 2009 – 4 January 2017
- Preceded by: Evgeny Kozhokin
- Succeeded by: Mikhail Fradkov

Personal details
- Born: 6 February 1947 (age 79) Potsdam, Soviet occupation zone
- Education: Kharkov State University

Military service
- Allegiance: Soviet Union; Russia
- Branch/service: Foreign Intelligence Service
- Years of service: 1976–2009
- Rank: Lieutenant-General

Leonid Petrovich Reshetnikov (Russian: Леонид Петрович Решетников; born 6 February 1947) is a Soviet and Russian secret service agent, Lieutenant-General of Foreign Intelligence Service, director of the Russian Institute for Strategic Studies (29 April 2009 – 4 January 2017) where he actively supported interference in the United States elections. He is called "the right hand of Mr. Putin on the Balkans."

== Biography ==
Reshetnikov was born in Potsdam (Soviet occupation zone at that time) in the family of a serviceman. In 1970, he graduated from the Faculty of History of Kharkov State University. In 1971-1974 he studied at the graduate school of Sofia University, where he defended thesis for the degree of Candidate of Historical Sciences on the topic "The participation of Bulgarian political emigrants in the construction of socialism in the Soviet Union (1921-1941)". In 1974-1976 he worked at the Institute of Economics of the World Socialist System of the USSR Academy of Sciences.

=== KGB and later SVR activities ===
From April 1976 to April 2009, he served in initially the KGB and later the Foreign Intelligence Service (SVR in Russian). He was the rezident KGB in the Balkans. One posting was at Yugoslavia where he was on a business trip for five years returning to the Soviet Union in 1984. From 1988 to 1993, he used the pseudonym Oleg Alekseev in Literaturnaya Rossiya (Russian: «Литературная Россия» или «ЛитРоссии») articles. Beginning in March 1991, he attended services at the Russian Church of St. Nicholas the Wonderworker in Sofia. Beginning in March 1995, he became a parishioner at Novospassky Stavropegic Monastery in Russia as an assistant vicar to Archbishop Alexy (Frolov) and from 2004-2010 he headed its board of trustees, which later grew into the Heritage Charitable Foundation. From 2001 to 2004, he was on a business trip to Greece and supported numerous monuments to honor Russia's cultural closeness to Greece.

At the end of his service he held the post of the head of Analysis & Information department of the Russian SVR with the rank of Lieutenant-General. In April 2009, he was dismissed in the reserve for the age limit.

On 29 April 2009 he became a director of the Russian Institute for Strategic Studies (RISS). According to presidential decree of 2 November 2016, he was dismissed from 4 January 2017. In this position, he actively supported interference in the United States elections.

Reshetnikov is very close to Konstantin Malofeev, who allegedly finances numerous pro-Kremlin activities especially Moscow-loyal parties and movements, including neo-Nazi ones, and, since 2010, Reshetnikov has supported the Foundation of St. Basil the Great K.V. Malofeev.

In February 2017 after the United States elections in 2016, Reshetnikov called Donald Trump a "patriot".

He actively supported the failed pro Russia, pro Kremlin, pro Putin 2016 Montenegro coup, which failed on 16 October 2016 and after which Vladimir Putin supposedly fired him from RISS.

As of January 2017, he is the chairman of the supervisory board of Tsargrad TV, which is a "Russian Orthodox" TV channel that began broadcasting on 12 April 2015, has a very anti-western geopolitical stance, and is associated with Konstantin Malofeev and both Alex Jones, who appears frequently on Tsargrad TV to prominently support Alexander Dugin, and former Fox News news director from 1996 to 2011 and Fox News co-founder John "Jack" Hanick (Russian: Джек Хэник), who moved to Moscow in 2013 to help Malofeev launch the channel. Through Reshetnikov and Malofeev, Hanick is close to the pro Russia former Greek defense minister Panos Kammenos and Vladimir Putin. Putin stronly supports Tsargrad TV which according to Malofeev is the Russian equivalent to Fox News. (Note: On 3 February 2022, John "Jack" Hanick, who allegedly was working to establish networks similar to Tsargrad TV in Greece and Bulgaria in support of Reshetnikov and worked at Fox News as a co-founder with producer Roger Ailes and was the news director at Fox News from 1996 to 2011, was arrested in London for sanction violations. Hanick was the first person criminally indicted for violating United States sanctions during the Russo-Ukrainian War.)

In November 2016, he initiated the creation of the "Double-headed Eagle" Society (Russian: Общество «Двуглавый Орёл»), which supports the development of Russian historical enlightenment in Russia, and after the formation of this orthodox-monarchist organization in 2018, joined its leadership and was deputy chairman from November 2017 - July 2020. Reshetnikov is close to Mikhail Smolin who runs the website for the Two-Headed Eagle Society also known as the Double-Headed Eagle Society (Russian: Двуглавый орёл) (rusorel.info) and who is also the publisher for the Moscow firm Society for the Development of Russian Historical Education "Two-Headed Eagle" (Russian: Общество развития русского исторического просвещения «Двуглавый орёл»), M. B. Smolin Publishing House (FIV) (Russian: Издательство М. Б. Смолина (ФИВ)). According to Smolin, the Double-Headed Eagle Society, which is now known as the Tsargrad Society, was formed to legally enshrine through legislation the unification of the former Russian Imperial Lands including the Russian Federation, Ukraine, Belarus, and other Russian lands into a common state. The Double-Headed Eagle Society is now known as the All-Russian Public Organization Society for the Promotion of Russian Historical Development Tsargrad (Tsargrad Society), which, according the United States Department of Treasury, is a Russia-registered organization which has been accused of involvement in espionage on behalf of Russia and is under United States sanctions since 20 April 2022. (Note: Other names for the former "Two-headed Eagle Society" (Russian: Общество «Двуглавый Орёл») are ALL-RUSSIAN PUBLIC ORGANIZATION SOCIETY FOR THE PROMOTION OF RUSSIAN HISTORICAL DEVELOPMENT TSARGRAD (Russian: ОБЩЕРОССИЙСКАЯ ОБЩЕСТВЕННАЯ ОРГАНИЗАЦИЯ ОБЩЕСТВО СОДЕЙСТВИЯ РУССКОМУ ИСТОРИЧЕСКОМУ РАЗВИТИЮ ЦАРЬГРАД) or ALL-RUSSIAN PUBLIC ORGANIZATION SOCIETY FOR THE DEVELOPMENT OF RUSSIAN HISTORICAL EDUCATION DOUBLE-HEADED EAGLE (Russian: ОБЩЕРОССИЙСКАЯ ОБЩЕСТВЕННАЯ ОРГАНИЗАЦИЯ ОБЩЕСТВО РАЗВИТИЯ РУССКОГО ИСТОРИЧЕСКОГО ПРОСВЕЩЕНИЯ ДВУГЛАВЫЙ ОРЕЛ) or ALL-RUSSIAN PUBLIC ORGANIZATION TSARGRAD (Russian: ОБЩЕРОССИЙСКАЯ ОБЩЕСТВЕННАЯ ОРГАНИЗАЦИЯ ЦАРЬГРАД) or DOUBLE HEADED EAGLE SOCIETY (Russian: Общество «Двуглавый Орёл») or formerly known as SOCIETY OF THE DOUBLE-HEADED EAGLE FOR THE PROPAGATION OF RUSSIAN HISTORICAL ENLIGHTENMENT or the TSARGRAD SOCIETY (Russian: ОБЩЕСТВО ЦАРЬГРАД).)

He is fluent in Russian, Bulgarian and Serbian, and can explain himself in Greek.

=== United States sanctions ===
Since 2016, the United States sanctioned Reshetnikov under Syrian sanctions because he is on the supervisory board of TEMPBANK (Russian: ТЕМПБАНК) which provides assistance to Bashar al-Assad.

=== Banned from Bulgaria ===
On 10 September 2019 he was banned from entering Bulgaria for a period of ten years, as was Malofeev. According to investigators, Reshetnikov's organizations (RISI and the "Double-headed Eagle") paid for espionage activities in Bulgaria and supported the pro-Russia actions of the Bulgarian politician Nikolai Malinov (Bulgarian: Николай Малинов). In particular, a memorandum was found with intentions to change the "geopolitical orientation" of Bulgaria, which was to be oriented away from the West, the European Union, and NATO and instead toward pro-Russia and pro-Putin, the creation of a television channel and an own party was supposed. (Note: Bulgarian politician Nikolai Malinov (Bulgarian: Николай Малинов) was chairman of the 2003 founded "Russophiles" National Movement (Bulgarian: Национално движение „Русофили“), which has as its co-chair the mayor of Kazanlak Galina Stoyanova (Bulgarian: Галина Стоянова) of the Boyko Borisov headed GERB political party. Nikolai Malinov headed the Bulgarian political party Russophiles for the Revival of the Fatherland (Bulgarian: Русофили за възраждане на Отечеството) that belongs to the Patriotic Front (Bulgarian: Патриотичен фронт) coalition which supports PASOK in Greece. Malinov is very active on Tsargrad TV with documentaries, commentaries, and interviews.) Reshetnikov supports Rumen Radev, Korneliya Ninova and the Bulgarian Socialist Party. Rosen Plevneliev has called Reshetnikov "the right hand of Mr. Putin on the Balkans."

=== Memberships ===
He is a member of the Scientific Council under the Minister of Foreign Affairs, the Scientific Council under the Security Council of the Russian Federation and the Public Council under the Ministry of Defense.

He is the president of the Non-profit Charitable Foundation "Heritage" ("Russian Lemnos") and a member of the editorial board of the magazine "Rodina".

== Publications ==
He is an expert on the White movement. In addition to his articles published under the pseudonym Oleg Alekseev in Literaturnaya Rossiya (Russian: «Литературная Россия» или «ЛитРоссии»), his publication topics include Soviet-Bulgarian relations in 1917-1945; the Russian emigration to Greece, Bulgaria, and Yugoslavia after the Russian Civil War; and the current political situation in the Balkans. His books include books "Russian Lemnos" (Russian: «Русский Лемнос») (Moscow: Novospassky Monastery, 1st ed. Moscow, 2009; 2nd ed. Moscow, 2010; 3rd ed. Moscow, 2012; 4th ed. Moscow, 2013; 5th ed. Moscow, 2015) and "Return to Russia. The Third Way, or the Dead Ends of Hopelessness" (Russian: «Вернуться в Россию. Третий путь, или тупики безнадежности») (Moscow: "FIV" )Russian: «ФИВ»), 2013; 2nd ed. M. "FIV", 2015, published in Serbia 2014, Bulgaria 2014, Armenia 2014 in Serbian, Bulgarian and Armenian).

== Personal ==
He is married to Olga Nikolaevna Reshetnikova, Candidate of Historical Sciences. They have two daughters and four grandchildren. One of his daughters, Elena Reshetnikova, supervises the project "Children's Camp on the Island of Lemnos", organized by the "Heritage".

As of late December 2023, he lives in Moscow in a 127 m² apartment at the "Mansion of Residents" (Russian: В «Особняке резидентов») or the "Residents' House" (Russian: «дома резидентов») which is located on Goncharnaya Street at House No. 5 in Tagansky District. (Note: Reshetnikov's 127 m² apartment at the "Mansion of Residents" (Russian: В «Особняке резидентов») or the "Residents' House" (Russian: «дома резидентов»), which is located on Goncharnaya Street at House No. 5 in Tagansky District, was built in 1999 at the former site of the house of D. E. Grachev which was built in 1913 by the architect N. D. Polikarpov but was demolished in the late 1990s for new construction of the current building.)

== See also ==
- GRU Unit 29155
