= Tsargrad TV =

Russian TV channel

- Country: Russia
- Broadcast area: Russia
- Headquarters: Moscow, Russia

Programming
- Language: Russian

Ownership
- Owner: Konstantin Malofeev

History
- Launched: 12 April 2015; 11 years ago

Links
- Website: tsargrad.tv

Tsargrad TV (Russian: Царьград ТВ) is a Russian television channel owned by Konstantin Malofeev. It was named after Tsargrad, the old Slavic name for Constantinople, now modern Istanbul. It is known for its pro-Kremlin and Russian Orthodox stances.

== History ==
Konstantin Malofeev hired former Fox News news director John "Jack" Hanick (Russian: Джек Хэник born 1950), who, with producer Roger Ailes, co-founded Fox News, was its news director from 1996 to 2011 and moved to Moscow in 2013 to help Malofeev launch the channel. From at least 2013 until 2018, Hanick supported Malofeev in several schemes. (Note: Under SYRIZA, Jack Hanick supported both Malofeev and Putin's goals by establishing the HellasNet TV network in Greece in 2015. HellasNet TV is a sister network of Tsargrad TV. Hanick explained to Malofeev that HellasNet TV would be an "opportunity to analyze in detail Russia's point of view on Greek television." With collaboration from journalist Kostas Vaxevanis, HellasNet TV was financed and headed by shipowner Yiannis Karagiorgis (Greek: γιαννησ καραγιωργησ). The HellasNet TV network was formed from ten regional stations: Attica TV in Athens and the main station, Alfa Television of Northern Greece (Eastern Macedonia and Thrace), Corfu Channel/Corfu Television (Western Greece), Network 1 Kastoria (Region of Western Macedonia), ENA Central Greece (Central Greece), Irida TV of Rhodes (Dodecanese), PLP Achaia (Peloponnese), Sitia TV of Lassithi (Crete), TVM of Lesvos (North Aegean) and TRT Magnesia (Thessaly). Others support the network include Panos Kammenos, the then Minister of Infrastructure Christos Spirtzis, the "red" contractor Christos Kalogritsas (Greek: Χρήστος Καλογρίτσας) whom the SYRIZA government had facilitated a loan for him from the state-controlled Attica Bank to buy a TV station license, the then Minister of Tourism Elena Kountoura and the General Secretary of Information, at the time, Lefteris Kretsos (Greek: Λευτέρης Κρέτσος).) Beginning in the fall of 2014, Hanick worked for Ilya Kuzmenkov (Russian: Илья Кузьменков), who was the general director and editor-in-chief of the channel. The channel started broadcasting on 12 April 2015 with Andrei Afanasiev (Russian: Андрей Афанасьев, born 1988 or 1989), who graduated from both MGIMO and Complutense University of Madrid and was a former RT employee from 2010 to 2014, as the news anchor. Aleksandr Dugin was named chief editor the same year. He has since been replaced by Elena Sharoykina. The channel is known for being conservative, mixing Russian Orthodox Christianity with Soviet nationalism, and supporting president Vladimir Putin.

Vladimir Putin gives carte blanche to Tsargrad TV which according to Malofeev is the Russian equivalent to Fox News.

In January 2017, KGB and Foreign Intelligence Service (Russia) Lieutenant General Leonid Reshetnikov headed the supervisory board of Tsargrad TV. Since 2017, the deputy editor in chief is Mikhail Borisovich Smolin. (Note: Mikhail Borisovich Smolin (Russian: Миха́ил Бори́сович Смо́лин, born February 22, 1971) is a nationalist Russian historian that writes with nationalist Russian conservative thought. In 1996, he graduated from the Faculty of History of St. Petersburg State University. In 2002, he defended his thesis for the degree of Candidate of Historical Sciences on the topic "State and legal ideas of L.A. Tikhomirov" (Russian: «Государственно-правовые идеи Л. А. Тихомирова»). He became a member of the Union of Writers of Russia. He is a publicist that owns publishing house for the Moscow firm Society for the Development of Russian Historical Education "Two-Headed Eagle" (Russian: Общество развития русского исторического просвещения «Двуглавый орёл»); M. B. Smolin Publishing House (FIV) (Russian: Издательство М. Б. Смолина (ФИВ)), and heads the Orthodox Center for Imperial Political Studies (Russian: Православный центр имперских исследований), the executive director of the Imperial Revival Foundation (Russian: фонд «Имперский возрождения»), as well as the editor-in-chief of the journals Imperial Revival (Russian: Имперское возрождение), Orthodox Volga Region (Russian: Православное Поволжье), Bulletin of South-Western Russia (Russian: Вестник Юго-Запада России) and, since 1997, the editor-publisher of the book series Ways of Russian Imperial Consciousness (Russian: Пути русского имперского сознания), Orthodox Thought (Russian: Православная мысль) and Imperial Tradition (Russian: Императорская традиция). He runs the website for the Two-Headed Eagle Society (Russian: Двуглавый орёл) (rusorel.info). The Double-Headed Eagle Society is now known as the All-Russian Public Organization Society for the Promotion of Russian Historical Development Tsargrad (Tsargrad Society), which, according the United States Department of Treasury, is a Russia-registered organization which has been accused of involvement in espionage on behalf of Russia and is under United States sanctions since 20 April 2022.).

Tsargrad TV Analytical Group is a very strong supporter of the United States alternative truth (Russian: альтернативная правда) or alt-right movement and provides support for Richard Spencer, Peter Schweizer, Milo Yiannopoulos, Breitbart News, Steve Bannon, Charles Bausman, whose wife Kristina Bausman is from Mednogorsk, Jordan Peterson and Alex Jones who appears frequently on Tsargrad TV and prominently supports Alexander Dugin.

On 12 February 2020, Dmitry Skuratov, (Note: In the early 1990s, Malofeev, Alexander Provotorov (born 7 November 1974, Moscow), and Dmitry Skuratov, who is the son of Yuri Skuratov and was two years younger in his studies than Malofeev and, through his sister Alexandra Yurievna Skuratova (born 18 August 1981), is the brother in law of Provotorov, are all close friends at Moscow State University. In June 2013, Dmitry Skuratov became the managing director of the Malofeev associated Marshall Capital Partners fund. Allegedly, Konstantin Malofeev became close to Igor Shchyogolev, while Shchyogolev was minister of communications, through Malofeev's childhood friend Arseny Mironov (Russian: Арсений Миронов) who, from 2008 to 2012, was the Director of the Information Department of the Ministry of Telecom and Mass Media of the Russian Federation. Anton Khozyainov (Russian: Антон Алексеевич Хозяинов; born on 14 October 1974), who was a former Senior Vice President of Rostelecom OJSC and through him allegedly Rostelecom's financial flows passed as he allegedly was Alexander Provotorov's "wallet" and the executor of schemes send budget funds to the accounts of companies whose beneficiary was Provotorov.) who is the son of Yuri Skuratov, became the general director of Tsargrad TV and Daria Tokareva (Russian: Дарья Токарева) became the editor-in-chief after Elena Sharoykina (Russian: Елена Шаройкина) left those positions for another position at Tsargrad TV.

Through Tsargrad TV and Malofeev, the pro-Russian former Greek defense minister Panos Kammenos is very close to Hanick and Reshetnikov.

During the COVID-19 pandemic, Tsargrad TV strongly supported the anti vaccination movement with Tsargrad TV host Alexandra Mashkova-Blagikh (Russian: Александра Владимировна Машкова-Благих) as an outspoken critic of COVID-19 vaccines. (Note: Alexandra Mashkova-Blagikh (Russian: Александра Владимировна Машкова-Благих; born 1980, Ufa) calls herself almost the main Russian anti-vaxxer because of her concern about the violation of civil rights and is a strong supporter of CitizenGo. Pavel Parfentiev (Russian: Павел Парфентьев) is another representative of CitizenGo in Russia. A 24 September 2016 article in El País linked the Mexican movement El Yunque to the 2013 founded anti-vaxxer movement CitizenGo and HazteOir which are headquartered in Spain and are close to the United States based Howard Center for Family, Religion and Society.)

In 2020, YouTube blocked its channel, citing U.S. sanctions against Malofeev.

In March 2022, Hanick was the first person criminally indicted by the United States Department of Justice for violating United States sanctions during the Russo-Ukrainian War for allegedly providing assistance to Malofeev in order to unfreeze some of Malofeev's assets.

In August 2023, the website of the Russian TV channel Tsargrad, which is linked to Russian oligarch Konstantin Malofeev, was blocked in Kazakhstan. The TV channel was sanctioned by the EU in December 2023. In August 2024, Google sued Tsargrad in the United States District Court for the Northern District of California.

== See also ==
- Russian disinformation
- Disinformation in the Russian invasion of Ukraine
