= Karen Bausman =

American architect (born 1958)

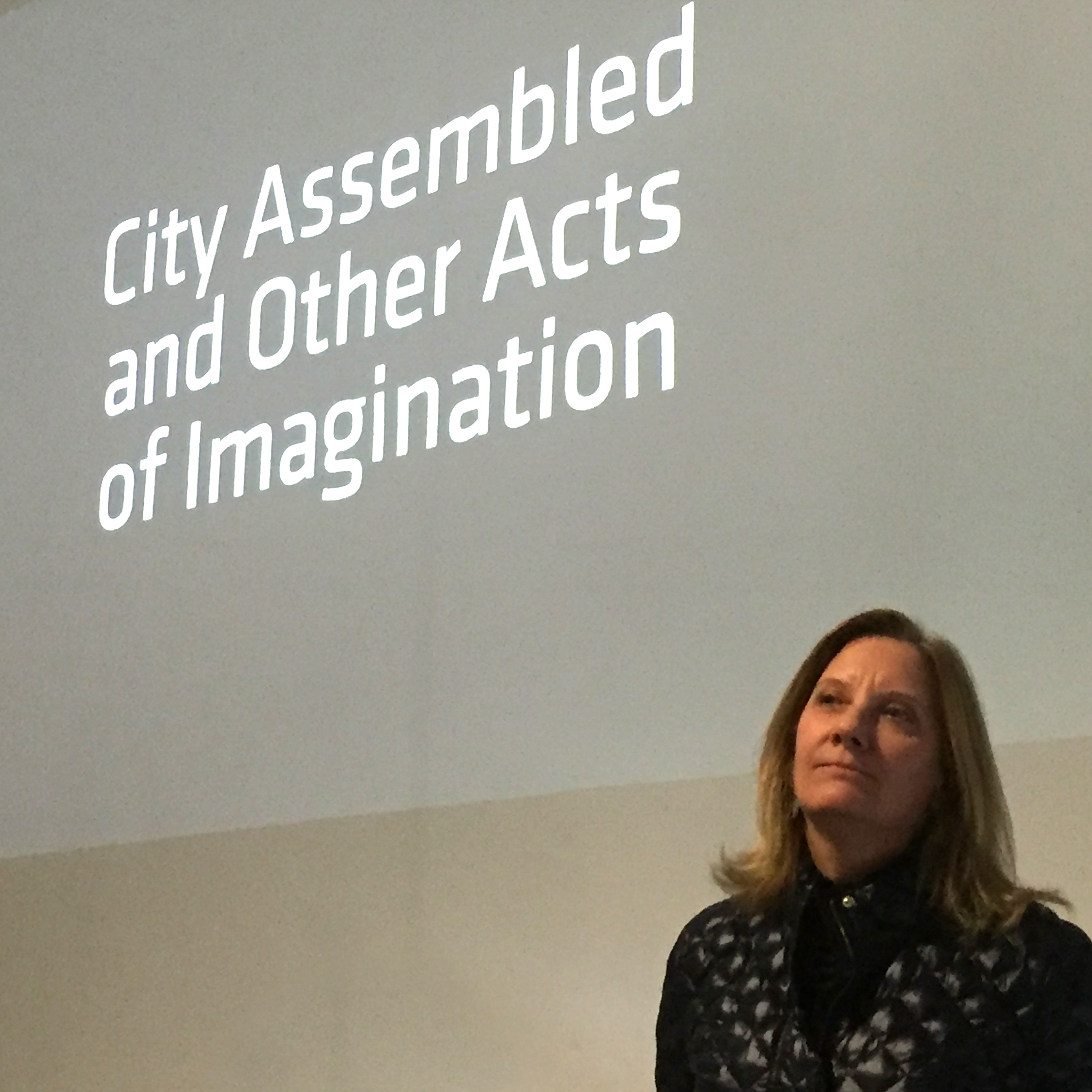
- Bausman in October 2018
- Born: February 8, 1958 (age 68); Allentown, Pennsylvania, U.S.
- Education: Cooper Union (Bachelor of Architecture)
- Occupation: Architect
- Awards: Rome Prize
- Practice: Karen Bausman + Associates

Karen Bausman (born February 8, 1958) is an American architect. She has previously served as the Eliot Noyes Chair at the Harvard Graduate School of Design at Harvard University and the Eero Saarinen Chair at Yale School of Architecture at Yale University, the only American woman to hold both design chairs.

She is principal of Karen Bausman + Associates, a Manhattan-based architecture firm founded in 1995.

== Early life and education ==
Bausman was born February 8, 1958, in Allentown, Pennsylvania, and attended Cooper Union in New York City, where she graduated with a Bachelor of Architecture in 1982.

The earliest and most lasting influence on her expanding thoughts about art and architecture, according to Bausman, was John Hejduk, Cooper Union's dean who revolutionized architectural education in the United States and encouraged independent research. Her thesis project, One-Way Bridge, was featured in Education of an Architect, published by Rizzoli International Publications in 1988 and exhibited in 2018 in Archive and Artifact: The Virtual and the Physical, a show highlighting the school's pedagogy through thesis projects from notable graduates. One-Way Bridge is part of Cooper Union's digital archive.

== Career ==
Bausman was a faculty member of Columbia University's School of Architecture's Advanced Architectural Design Studio (AAD) from 1990 to 2004 as the design studio was radically altered by digital visualization, the introduction of new materials, and the integration of digital with analog production. Her applied research into biological and other natural structures, together with computational design techniques she developed are featured in INDEX Architecture, a Columbia Graduate School of Architecture, Planning and Preservation book published by MIT Press in 2003.

In April 1994, Bausman was awarded the Rome Prize at a White House ceremony. She was awarded the Cooper Union Citation for Outstanding Contributions to the Field of Architecture in that same year. In 1995, she was elected a Fellow of the American Academy in Rome.

In 2005, she was the subject of a profile in The New York Times after her firm was awarded a multiyear design and construction excellence contract as part of former New York City Mayor Michael Bloomberg’s initiative to bring new ideas and technologies to the design of city-financed libraries, community centers, and other structures in New York City. She received the 2022 Lucy G. Moss Preservation Award from the New York Landmarks Conservancy for Highbridge Step Street and Tower, large-scale civic waterfront infrastructure projects for the City of New York.

Bausman leads a research consortium at Pratt School of Architecture, Brooklyn, on how energy source issues impact built environments and how new technologies, such as wind power can be integrated into New York's waterfront infrastructure design.

Among Bausman's interior design projects are award-winning New York headquarters for her private clients Warner Bros. and Elektra Entertainment Group. She has also built numerous private residences. The Women Who Changed Architecture features a selection of her works.

Bausman lectures on her work and on architecture at universities nationwide and as a television commentator, including "The Towers of Gotham" episode on Secrets of New York on PBS stations.

Bausman's study of nature's sustainable structures and her research into biological composite systems underlie her building designs. Suggesting unfolding flower petals, Performance Theater, which was designed as a hybrid performance venue for Warner Bros. in Los Angeles, replaced a parking lot in the center of its Burbank, California campus with flexible stage and amphitheater spaces for use by the entertainment community. "It springs from the ground in a way that is expressive of the expansive new ideas embodied by the company's roster of performing artists," she said when accepting the Progressive Architecture Award for the theater's design in 1998.

This commission and other works that push the boundaries of structural and visual poetry formed the basis of Karen Bausman: Supermodels, a solo exhibition of her building designs and working methods at Harvard University in 2001. She debuted her Performance Theater project drawings in 1997 in stung by splendor: working drawings and the creative moment, a group exhibition that also included the work of Chuck Hoberman, Jenny Holtzer, Maya Lin, and Frank Stella at Arthur A. Houghton Jr, Gallery. Her drawings were also exhibited in Architects Draw: Freeing the Hand at Arthur A. Houghton Jr. Gallery in 2008 and featured in Architects Draw, published by Princeton Architectural Press in 2008.

== Awards and honors ==
- Elliot Noyes Chair, Harvard Graduate School of Design, Harvard University, 2001
- Progressive Architecture Award for Design Excellence, Progressive Architecture magazine, 1998
- Rome Prize, American Academy in Rome, 1994
- Eero Saarinen Chair, Yale School of Architecture, Yale University, 1994
- Cooper Union Citation for Outstanding Contributions to the Field of Architecture, 1994
- Emerging Voices, Architectural League of New York, 1992
- New York Foundation for the Arts fellowship, 1988, 1996

== Major building designs ==
- Performance Theater for Warner Bros., Los Angeles (P/A Award 1998)
- Hamlin Chapel and Library (Architecture awards issue)
- Korean Memorial and Cultural Center (Karen Bausman: "Supermodels" Exhibit, Harvard Graduate School of Design
- Flower Tower
- Highbridge Step Street (New York Landmarks Conservancy 2022 Lucy G. Moss Preservation Award)
