= Bausman Mine =

Mine in United States of America

The Bausman mine was a 19th-century coal mine in the Pittsburgh area. The mine was started in 1844 by Frederick Bausman, and ran underground from 12th Street in Birmingham, Pennsylvania (modern South Side, Pittsburgh) to Spiketown. Coal from other mines in Spiketown was transferred through this mine using a steam locomotive.

== Bausman's Rhinoceros ==
The "rhinoceros" was an early steam locomotive used in the Bausman mine. It was a 3 ft (914 mm) steam locomotive built for a narrow-gauge railway of an unusual design. The original builder is unknown. It was rebuilt by Thatcher Perkins of the Pittsburgh Locomotive Works in 1867. The locomotive was designed with an unusual driving mechanism in order to minimize the vertical forces of the wheels on the iron tracks.
