= Pushchino Radio Astronomy Observatory =

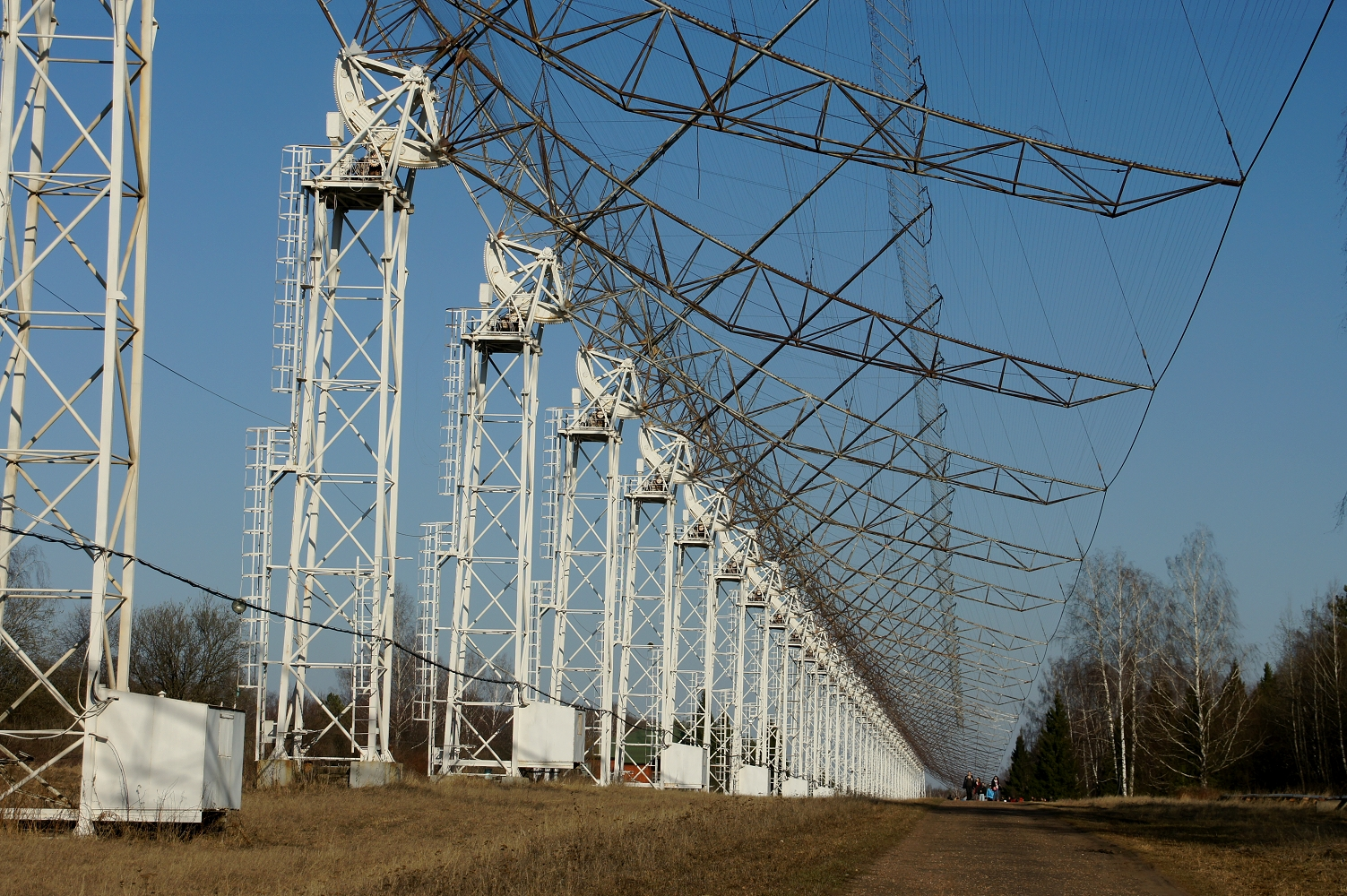
- Organization: Astro Space Center of Lebedev Physical Institute (LPI), Russian Academy of Sciences
- Location: Pushchino-on-Oka, Russia (near Moscow)
- Coordinates: 54°49′20″N 37°37′53″E
- Established: April 11, 1956
- Closed: still active
- Website: http://www.prao.ru/

Telescopes
- RT 22 (1959): Four, separate, fully steerable, radio telescope with 22 meter mirrors
- DKR 1000 (1964): A wide-band radio telescope instrument
- BSA/LPI (1973): Large Phased Array
- Related media on Commons

Pushchino Radio Astronomy Observatory is a Russian (former Soviet) radio astronomy observatory. It was developed by Lebedev Physical Institute (LPI), Russian Academy of Sciences within a span of twenty years. It was founded on April 11, 1956, and currently occupies 70 000 square meters.

== Radio astronomy in Russia ==
Historically, Russian radio astronomy (formerly Soviet) has had a permanent and stable connection with the P N Lebedev Physical Institute (LPI) of the Russian Academy of Sciences. The institute had both permanent stations and conducted expeditions to locations in the field in the Crimea region. These facilities, and expeditions were designed for research in radio astronomy beginning in the late 1940s.

A decade later the center for radio astronomy research had gravitated to the southern Moscow region (about 75 miles south of Moscow), in Pushchino (informally called Pushchino-on-Oka). Here a new observatory, the Pushchino Radio Astronomy Observatory was developed within twenty years as part of the LPI Astro Space Center. It has become one of the largest radio astronomy observatories in Russia and in the world (2001). It was founded in April, 11th, 1956 under the purview of the Academy of Sciences of the USSR.

=== History of equipment in use ===
The Pushchino Radio Astronomy Observatory has four notable radio telescopes (RT 22), each with mirrors at 22 meters. Constructed in 1959 these are fully steerable, and are designed to operate in millimeter and centimeter ranges of wavelength. Added to the equipage is the DKR 1000, a wide-band radio telescope instrument, on-line in 1964, and operating in the meter wavelength range. The DKR 1000 has arms that are 40 by 1000 meters. In 1973, another telescope was added to this set. The nomenclature is "Large Phased Array" with the designation BSA/LPI, operating in the meter wavelength range. The DKR 1000 and BSA/LPI, are currently the largest radio telescopes in the world, which operate in the meter range.

== Research divisions ==
The Observatory employs 45 researchers along with 60 engineers and technicians to accomplish staff the several major departments and several labs of the observatory. These are combined with 80 other people who perform administrative duties, workshops, garage, and a staff of guards. The departments and labs are designed to focus on scientific and technical aspects of observatory sciences.

The departments are as follows: Plasma astrophysics, Extragalactic radio astronomy, Pulsar physics, Space radio spectroscopy, and Pulsar astrometry. The laboratories are as follows: Radio astronomy equipment, Automation radio astronomy research, Computer engineering and information technology, and Radio telescopes of the meter wavelength range.

== Main areas of research ==
A section of Pushchino Radio Astronomy Observatory

- radio astronomy for astrophysics
- molecular clouds physics
- space masers
- giant atoms in space
- star formation processes (research and investigation)
- physical conditions in the diffuse interstellar medium
- supernova remnants and the interstellar medium
- radio emission of radio galaxies and quasars
- interplanetary plasma and solar wind investigations
- how perturbations propagate in the interplanetary plasma is studied
- Northern hemispheric isotope construction
- catalogue of radio sources
- active galactic nuclei are studied
- very large baseline interferometry (VLBI)
- pulsars physics which are neutron stars
- pulsar radio emission is studied in the context of microstructure of pulse and the mechanism involved.
- establish pulsar time scale by timing of pulsars.

== Outstanding achievements ==
Alfven waves energy flow at 10 solar radii,
establish the existence of a planet near pulsar PSR B0329+54,
catalogue the spectra of 336 pulsars, discovery of a radio pulsar 102 MHz while observing X-ray radio source Geminga,
another radio pulsar discovered as the source of SGR 1900+14
an interplanetary scintillating method accomplishes a successful survey of compact radio sources.

== See also ==
- University of California High-Performance AstroComputing Center

== General references ==
- Book chapters:
  Artyukh, Vadim S. (January 2002). Investigations of AGNS by the Interplanetary Scintillation Method. p. 185. ISBN 978-1-4020-0048-5.
  Kuzmin, Arkady (January 2002). Scattering of the low frequency Pulsar Radiation. p. 53. ISBN 978-1-4020-0048-5.
  Book citation: Sources and Scintillations: Refraction and Scattering in Radio Astronomy. Edited by Richard Strom, Peng Bo, Mark Walker, and Nan Rendong. IAU Colloquium 182. Strom, Richard; Bo, Peng; Walker, Mark (2001). Sources and Scintillations. ISBN 978-1-4020-0048-5. Kluwer Academic Publishers, Dordrecht.
  Reprinted from Astrophysics and Space Science, Volume 278 (1-2), 2001, p. 255.
