= Znamensky District, Russia =

Location of Omsk Oblast in Russia

Location of Oryol Oblast in Russia

Location of Tambov Oblast in Russia

Znamensky District is the name of several administrative and municipal districts in Russia.

- Znamensky District, Omsk Oblast, an administrative and municipal district of Omsk Oblast
- Znamensky District, Oryol Oblast, an administrative and municipal district of Oryol Oblast
- Znamensky District, Tambov Oblast, an administrative and municipal district of Tambov Oblast
