= Frederick Bausman =

American mine operator

- Born: November 3, 1825; Pittsburgh, Pennsylvania
- Citizenship: United States
- Known for: Bausman mine
- Parent(s): Dr. Frederick Bausman (–1834), Sarah Beltzhoover
- Relatives: Frederick Bausman (judge) (1861–1931)(nephew)

Frederick Bausman was an early coal mining operator in Allegheny County, Pennsylvania. Born in Pittsburgh in 1825, he was the son of Doctor Frederick Bausman and Sarah Beltzhoover.

== Libel charges ==
In 1890, he filed criminal libel charges against Giuseppi Carusi, for a circular he published about his wife, the former Virginia Knox, and Frederick's half-sister.

== See also ==
- Bausman Mine, 19th-century coal mine in the Pittsburgh area established by Frederick Bausman
