= Russian Institute for Strategic Studies =

Russian state-controlled organization

- Российский институт стратегических исследований
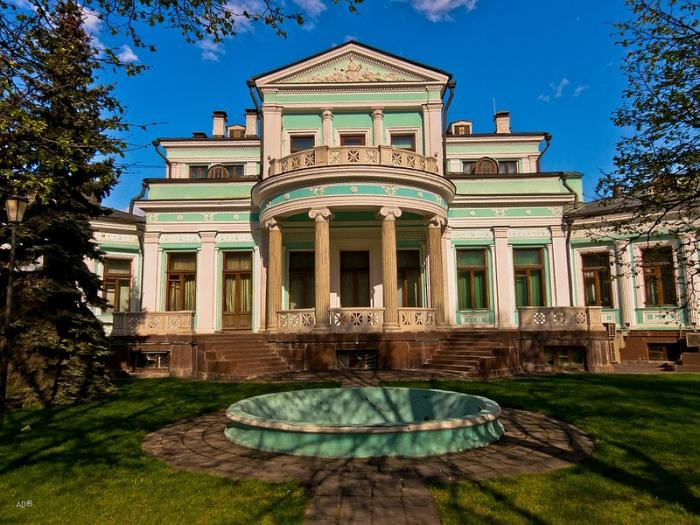
- Abbreviation: RISS
- Formation: February 29, 1992; 34 years ago
- Type: Think tank
- Headquarters: 125413, Moscow, Flotskaya St., 15B (Main Office); 119002, Moscow, Smolensky Boulevard, 26/9, building 1 (Representative Office)
- Official language: Russian
- Director: Mikhail Fradkov
- Parent organization: Presidential Administration of Russia
- Website: riss.ru

The Russian Institute for Strategic Studies (RISS) (Note: Russian: Российский институт стратегических исследований (РИСИ), romanized: Rossiyskiy institut strategicheskikh issledovaniy (RISI)) is a Russian state-controlled research and analytical center based in Moscow. Formed by a decree of former Russian Federation President Boris Yeltsin on 29 February 1992, the institute was originally part of the Foreign Intelligence Service (SVR). In 2009, it was transferred to the Presidential Administration of Russia and is now directly accountable to the President of Russia. Its current director is former Prime Minister and intelligence chief Mikhail Fradkov.

RISS operates as a state-funded think tank, drafting information and analytical memos, policy recommendations, and strategic assessments for the Russian government and the Kremlin. Due to its historical ties to the SVR and its personnel, the institute is frequently noted by observers for employing numerous retired senior Russian foreign intelligence officials.

In international media and by Western intelligence agencies, RISS has been characterized as an instrument of state propaganda that promotes conservative, anti-Western, and anti-Ukrainian viewpoints. The organization gained global prominence following reports that it had developed a strategy for Russian interference in the 2016 United States elections in an effort to influence the outcome in favor of Donald Trump. In response to allegations of spreading disinformation and supporting the Russian invasion of Ukraine, the institute and its leadership have been placed under international sanctions by several countries, including the United States, Canada, and the European Union.

== History ==
The institute was part of the Foreign Intelligence Service until 2009, when it was transferred to the Presidential Administration of Russia and became directly accountable to the President of Russia. On 4 January 2017, former Prime Minister and intelligence chief Mikhail Fradkov assumed office as the Director of RISS, succeeding Leonid Reshetnikov.

By Presidential Decree No. 290 of 27 April 2020, RISS changed its formal legal status, transitioning from a "scientific budgetary institution" to a general "budgetary institution," effectively removing its formal classification as an exclusively scientific organization.

== Building ==
Since 2017, RISS has used the former mansion of Margarita Morozova at Smolensky Boulevard, 26/9, building 1, for its representative offices. The building underwent renovations managed by the Directorate of the President of the Russian Federation, following authorization by Vladimir Putin on 22 February 2017. (Note: Mikhail Fradkov's son Pavel Fradkov (Russian: Павел Фрадков) formerly served as the deputy head of the Directorate of the President of the Russian Federation before his appointment as Deputy Minister of Defense in June 2024.) In 2019, the restoration was completed. (Note: From 1993 to 2015, the Morozov house was the location of the Rossiysky Kredit Bank (Russian: банк «Российский кредит»). After its license was revoked by the Central Bank of Russia on 24 July 2015, the Directorate of the President of the Russian Federation assumed management of the property.)

== Activities ==
According to its mission statement and official charter, the organization's activities include:

- Research work and development of analytical materials, proposals, recommendations, and expert assessments for state structures of Russia;
- Informing political and scientific circles, and the public about issues affecting national security and the strategic interests of Russia;
- Organizing and conducting scientific-practical conferences, seminars, and situational analyses on priority policy issues;
- Providing information and consulting services.

== Structure ==
RISS operates through its main offices in Moscow and maintains a network of regional research and information centers. Over the years, these have included regional branches in Russian cities such as Saint Petersburg, Kaliningrad, Yekaterinburg, Rostov-on-Don, and Vladivostok, as well as representatives abroad in locations such as Belgrade and Helsinki.

== Directors ==
- Yuri Scepinsky (1991–1994)
- Evgeny Kozhokin (1994–2009)
- Leonid Reshetnikov (2009 – 4 January 2017)
- Mikhail Fradkov (since 4 January 2017)

== Sanctions ==
On 22 September 2023, the Russian Institute for Strategic Studies was placed under sanctions by Canada as part of a series of measures targeting organizations and entities involved in Russian disinformation, propaganda campaigns, and supporting the invasion of Ukraine. RISS Director Mikhail Fradkov has also been under personal sanctions by the United States since April 2018, and is additionally sanctioned by the European Union, United Kingdom, Canada, Ukraine, and Switzerland.

== Controversies and public image ==
=== Ties to intelligence agencies ===
Due to its origin within the Foreign Intelligence Service, media outlets frequently highlight the organization's connections to Russian security agencies. The Moscow Times described RISS as a place where "old spooks are sent to retire", alleging that the institute's influence had waned under the leadership of Leonid Reshetnikov. Similarly, The New York Times reporter Ivan Nechepurenko noted that within Russia, RISS is often viewed as a "semiretirement refuge for former intelligence officers" where they can transition to civilian work.

=== Ideological stance ===
Analysts and media have described the organization as promoting conservative, anti-Western, and illiberal ideologies, pointing to publications that express anti-LGBT, anti-divorce, and anti-abortion sentiments, as well as criticism of sex education in public schools.

According to Bloomberg columnist Leonid Bershidsky, during Reshetnikov's tenure, the institute developed ties with far-right movements. Bershidsky characterizes Reshetnikov as a nationalist closely aligned with the milieu that supported the pro-Russian rebellion in eastern Ukraine, though he notes that while Putin uses such groups informally, they do not hold a monopoly on his policy decisions.

=== HIV/AIDS report ===
In 2016, three RISS researchers and deputy directors (holding degrees in sociology and historical sciences rather than medicine) co-authored a report on HIV/AIDS in Russia. According to the Russian newspaper Kommersant, the report claimed that statements regarding an HIV epidemic in Russia were part of a Western information war aimed at forcing Russia to abandon its independent domestic and foreign policies. The authors criticized the "Western model" of combating the disease and controversially suggested that the promotion of condoms contributes to the spread of HIV by encouraging risky behavior, arguing instead that the focus should be placed on traditional family values and fighting "drugs and debauchery".

=== Allegations of political interference ===
The organization has been accused of supporting pro-Russian politicians internationally and interfering in foreign politics. In 2019, former director Leonid Reshetnikov was banned from entering Bulgaria for 10 years following allegations that RISS had coordinated a campaign to interfere in Bulgarian domestic elections. Researchers have also pointed to instances where people affiliated with the institute proposed the annexation of Western Ukraine by Poland in an attempt to foster a Polish-Russian anti-Ukrainian alliance.

==== 2016 US presidential election ====
In April 2017, Reuters reported that multiple U.S. officials identified RISS as the author of a strategic plan to sway the 2016 U.S. presidential election toward Donald Trump and to undermine American voters' faith in their democratic system.

According to the unidentified U.S. officials cited in the report, the strategy was directed by Putin and overseen by former SVR officers, including Reshetnikov, who headed the institute at the time. A first set of recommendations, reportedly issued in June 2016, suggested supporting a presidential candidate who would be more favorable to Russia via a social media campaign and Russia-backed news outlets. A second document, drafted roughly a month before the election when Hillary Clinton was widely expected to win, reportedly advised shifting the strategy toward undermining confidence in the electoral system by disseminating claims of voter fraud. Following the publication of these allegations, RISS director Mikhail Fradkov and Kremlin spokesman Dmitry Peskov denied the claims.
