= Triple parentheses =

Antisemitic symbol

Triple parentheses

Triple parentheses or triple brackets, also referred to as an echo (stylized as (((echo)))), is an antisemitic symbol and orthotypographical convention. The symbol has been used online by antisemites to mark individuals or organizations perceived as Jews as targets for online harassment and doxxing.

This use of the symbol originated from the alt-right-affiliated, neo-Nazi blog The Right Stuff, whose editors said that the symbol refers to the historic actions of Jews which have caused their surnames to "echo throughout history". The triple parentheses have been adopted as an online stigma by antisemites, neo-Nazis, browsers of the "Politically Incorrect" board on 4chan, and white nationalists to identify individuals of Jewish background as targets for online harassment, such as Jewish political journalists critical of Donald Trump during his 2016 election campaign.

Use of the notation was brought to mainstream attention by an article posted by Mic in June 2016. The reports also led Google to remove a browser extension meant to automatically place the "echo" notation around Jewish names on web pages, named "Coincidence Detector", and the notation being classified as a form of hate speech by the Anti-Defamation League. In the wake of these actions, some users, both Jews and non-Jews, have intentionally placed their own names within triple parentheses as an act of reappropriation or solidarity.

Prior to its use as an antisemitic label or identifier, ((( screen name ))) had been used in online communities such as AOL to indicate that a user was "cyberhugging" the user with the specified screen name.

== Use ==
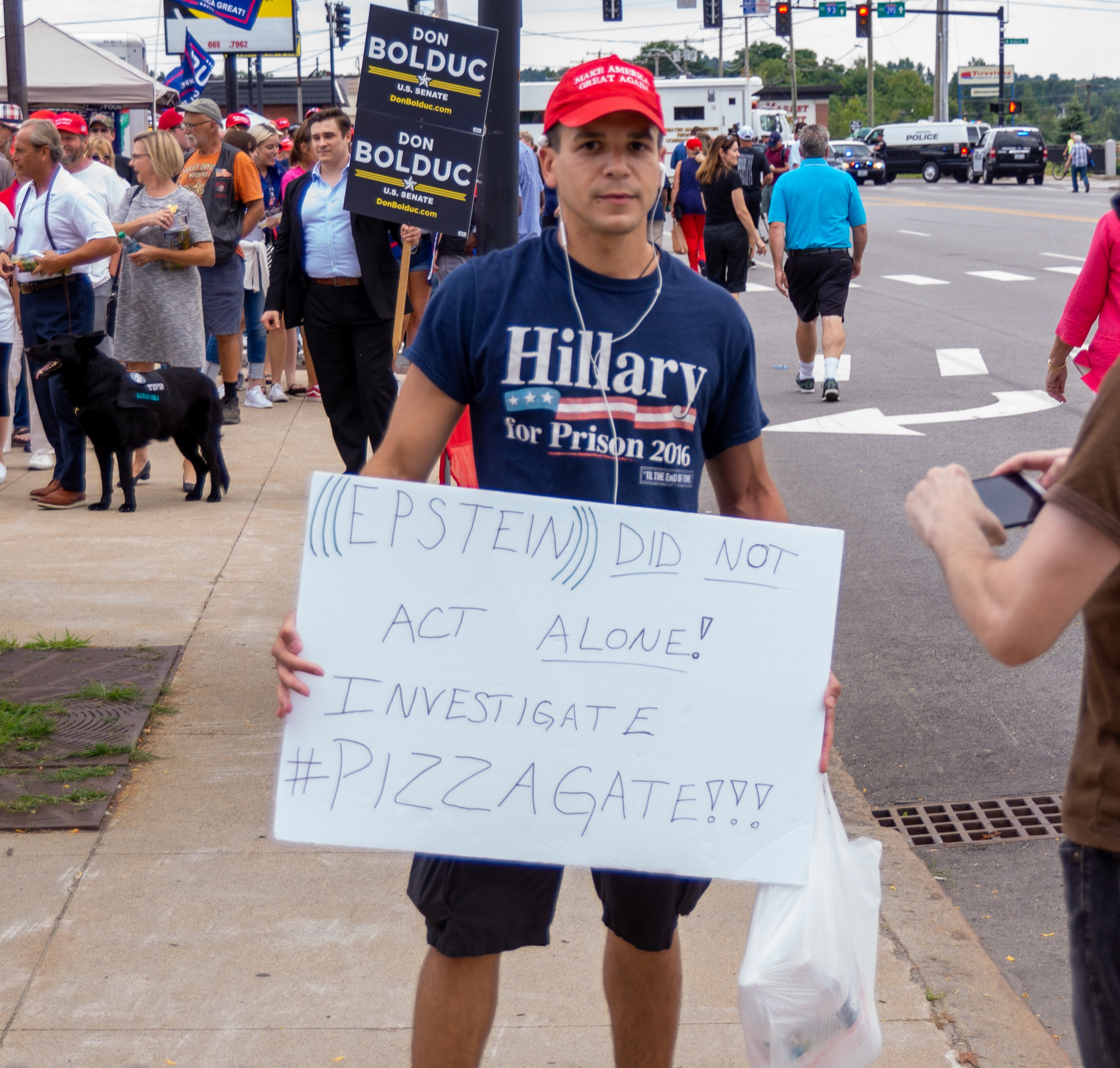
A conspiracy theorist holding a sign commenting on Pizzagate and the death of Jeffrey Epstein, with triple parentheses identifying Epstein as Jewish

The use of the "echo" originated from a 2014 episode of The Daily Shoah, a podcast produced by the alt-right, antisemitic, white nationalist blog The Right Stuff. The podcast includes a segment known as the "Merchant Minute", where Jewish names are spoken with a cartoonish echo effect to single them out. The editors of The Right Stuff explained that the use of an echo, represented in text using triple parentheses, was an internal meme meant to symbolize an opinion that the actions of Jews in the past cause their names to "echo throughout history". From the inside out, each parenthesis represents perceived Jewish involvement in mass media, mass immigration, and global Zionism.

The triple parentheses have since been used on social networking services such as Twitter by antisemites, alt-righters, neo-Nazis, and white nationalists as a signal to target Jews for harassment. A number of Jewish journalists told the website Mic that after their names were mentioned in echoes, they began to receive messages from trolls containing antisemitic messages, Holocaust photos, and death threats. The Jerusalem Post reported that the triple parentheses had "emerged as a weapon in the arsenal of the so-called 'alt-right', an amorphous, primarily online conservative movement that has been becoming more visible and vocal in the midst of Donald Trump's presidential campaign", and that these tactics were increasingly being used to target Jewish journalists posting content that was critical of the Republican Party candidate. A user who engages in these "dog-piling" actions described the echo notation as being like a "dog whistle". Search engines typically ignore punctuation contained in a query, meaning that it can be difficult to intentionally locate posts containing this notation.

In a June 2016 article detailing the phenomenon, Mic also reported that a browser extension had been developed for the Google Chrome web browser known as "Coincidence Detector", which automatically places the triple parentheses around the names of individuals who "[have] been involved in certain political movements and media empires". The extension contains a list of 8,771 names, including common Jewish names and surnames, those of media personalities who have been critical of Trump, Trump's son-in-law Jared Kushner, as well as organizations such as Ben & Jerry's and Kars4Kids.

In June 2016, the Twitter account dril posted a satirical tweet using the triple parentheses around the "Keebler Elves". Journalist Jay Hathaway noted that while intended as satire, the post highlighted the uncertain social consensus around ironic uses of the symbol, though some users criticized it and others misinterpreted it as genuine support.

== Historical parallels ==
During the Soviet campaign against "rootless cosmopolitans", publications often placed original Jewish surnames in single parentheses following authors' pseudonyms to highlight their Jewish identity.

== Response ==
On June 3, 2016, following the publishing of the Mic article, Google pulled the Coincidence Detector extension from the Chrome Web Store, citing a violation of its policies prohibiting "promotions of hate or incitement of violence". It had been downloaded around 2,500 times before its removal. In the wake of Google's removal of the extension, some Twitter users, including Jews and non-Jews, intentionally put triple parentheses around their usernames in an act of reappropriation or solidarity. White nationalists, in turn, put inverted echo parentheses—like )))this(((—around their usernames to indicate their non-Jewish heritage. Author Jeffrey Goldberg from The Atlantic said that he hoped that Jews could reclaim the symbolism in the same way as some LGBT people had reclaimed the word "queer". Jonathan Weisman, an editor at The New York Times, included the triple parentheses in the title of his 2018 book release, (((Semitism))): Being Jewish in America in the Age of Trump.

On June 6, 2016, the Anti-Defamation League (ADL) announced that it had placed the triple parentheses in its database of symbols that it considers hate speech. CEO Jonathan Greenblatt explained that the symbol was "the online equivalent of tagging a building with anti-Semitic graffiti or taunting someone verbally", and that the ADL was "working with our partners in the tech industry to investigate this phenomenon more deeply".

== See also ==
- /pol/ – Political discussion board on 4chan
- Nun (letter) § Social media campaign (2014)
- Happy Merchant – Antisemitic caricature
- Antisemitic canard – False claims about Jews and Judaism
- Right-wing antiglobalism – Ethno-nationalist political stance
  - Globalism § Right-wing usage
