= The Right Stuff (blog) =

Neo-Nazi website and podcast network

- Website type: Neo-Nazism; Conspiracy theories about Jews; Race hatred
- Creator: Mike Enoch
- Website: therightstuff.biz
- Launched: December 2012; 13 years ago

The Right Stuff is a neo-Nazi, antisemitic and white nationalist blog and discussion forum and the host of several podcasts, including The Daily Shoah. Founded by American neo-Nazi Mike Enoch, the website promotes Holocaust denial, and coined the use of "echoes", an antisemitic marker that uses triple parentheses around names to identify Jewish people.

== Content ==
The site promotes white supremacy, neo-Nazism, antisemitism, Holocaust denial, and the white genocide conspiracy theory. It cites the work of Kevin B. MacDonald, a former professor of psychology and antisemitic conspiracy theorist, known for claiming that Jews have exhibited a "group evolutionary strategy" to undermine the interests of white people.

Much of The Right Stuff's content is devoted to Holocaust denial, including denying the Nazi's genocidal policies against Poles, Russians, and other Slavic peoples, known by neo-Nazis as "untermenschen". To justify their denial of Nazi atrocities, contributors to The Right Stuff promote the conspiracy theory that the documentary record establishing those genocides was forged by unspecified Jewish people or agents of Jews.

In December 2012, The Right Stuff described itself as "a political and cultural blog" which aimed to unite the "alt-right" and to troll liberals and progressives. Over time, its podcasts became more radical, and the blog adopted a conspiratorial neo-Nazi ideology. The blog eventually developed a lexicon, defining jargon used by its publications and the wider alt-right movement.

The website achieved general notoriety through its promotion of the triple parentheses or (((echo))). In 2014, The Daily Shoah began to use a distortion effect when the names of Jewish people were mentioned during a segment called the "Merchant Minute". The meme was adapted to text through the use of parentheses, and in the summer of 2016, it became known through a New York Times column on the topic. The Right Stuff was also one of the earliest websites to make use of the term "cuckservative".

The blog was an early proponent of the propaganda film With Open Gates, which attacks multiculturalism and Middle Eastern refugees in Europe and promotes the conspiracy theory that Jews are transporting refugees to harm white people.

The blog has seen a steady decline from its peak in 2017. In September 2021, a Southern Poverty Law Center report found that the website had declined in traffic by 87.5% since February 2017, coinciding with a decline in the total number of cast members appearing on The Daily Shoah. In February 2019, The Right Stuff founder Mike Enoch responded to a data subpoena related to the Sines v. Kessler civil lawsuit by stating that TRS had "lost regular listeners", and that many users had "cancelled their accounts and stopped visiting the site".

== Doxing incident ==
In early 2017, Mike Enoch was doxed by fellow neo-Nazis, who revealed that his real name was Mike Peinovich. They also released biographical information which they believe contradicts his professed ideology. The dox revealed that Enoch's wife was Jewish and that their wedding had featured traditional Jewish rites and chanting. Enoch was mocked by other neo-Nazis for his Serbian surname; historically, Nazi Germany had classified Serbs as a subhuman race and the Croatian Ustaše puppet regime had perpetrated a genocide of Serbs.

After the doxing, some of Enoch's followers reacted angrily to the information that had been revealed. They circulated forged images of him and his wife which derided their ethnicities. Salon journalist Matthew Sheffield posited that Neo-Nazi podcast listeners speculated that Enoch was Jewish, "controlled opposition", or otherwise disingenuous in his beliefs.

== Alex McNabb ==
Alex McNabb is a former emergency medical technician (EMT) who appeared on The Daily Shoah under the pseudonym "Dr. Narcan". He was fired from his job as an EMT after racist comments that he had made on The Daily Shoah came to light, including comparing black patients to animals and claiming to have tortured a young black boy using a catheter needle.

== National Justice Party ==
National Justice Party
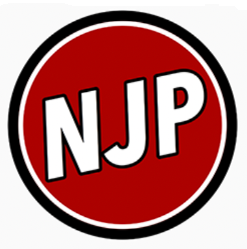
- Chairperson: Mike Peinovich
- Founders: Mike Peinovich, Joseph Jordan, Tony Hovater, Michael McKevitt, Gregory Conte, Warren Balogh, Alan Balogh
- Founded: August 15, 2020; 6 years ago
- Dissolved: December 2023
- Ideology: Antisemitism; Anti-Zionism; Neo-Nazism; White supremacy; White nationalism; Anti-capitalism
- Political position: Far-right
- National affiliation: Patriot Front
- Colors: black, red and white

Website
- nationaljusticeparty.com (defunct) justicereport.news (defunct)

The National Justice Party (NJP) was an antisemitic white supremacist political organization in the United States that promoted neo-Nazism. It was not a registered party for purposes of electoral politics.

The Right Stuff announced the National Justice Party in August 2020, to be led by Mike Enoch, with a platform based upon the white genocide conspiracy theory. The party platform also incorporated antisemitic elements, such as calling for mandatory employment discrimination to prevent Jews from working in "vital institutions". The chairmen of the party included several prominent white supremacist and alt-right figures, including Joseph Jordan (also known as Eric Striker), Tony Hovater, Michael McKevitt, Gregory Conte, Warren Balogh, and former member of the neo-Nazi National Alliance, Alan Balogh.

NJP held its inaugural event in Millersville Pike just outside Lancaster, Pennsylvania. NJP also hosted a meeting in response to the January 6 United States Capitol attack. On July 24, 2021, NJP hosted its fifth party event in the Midwest and released a full-length documentary about the event. NJP members had also organized gatherings in Ohio, Wisconsin, and North Dakota to protest what they claim are "anti-white" killings involving black suspects.

NJP was also connected to Antelope Hill Publishing, which publishes books by Nazis and fascists and sells those books at NJP events and on the internet. In early 2024, their website's SSL certificate expired, leaving the website inaccessible.

Although not an official merger, former members of the NJP were integrated into the Aryan Freedom Network.

== Mention in the Epstein files ==
The Epstein files include an email Jeffrey Epstein sent to Noam Chomsky in 2016, in which he linked to an article from The Right Stuff which promoted a genetic basis for race and intelligence.

== See also ==
- Antisemitism in the United States
- Neo-Nazism in the United States
