= Matthew Colligan =

American neo-Nazi

- Born: Southborough, Massachusetts, United States
- Education: High school diploma, Algonquin Regional High School
- Occupation: Media personality

Matthew Colligan is an American online personality who posted neo-Nazi memes under the handle Millennial Matt alongside white nationalist influencer Baked Alaska. His identity was revealed through his participation in the 2017 Unite the Right rally in Charlottesville, Virginia. One of Colligan's repeated memes is the phrase "Hitler did nothing wrong", which he has said in radio, tweets, and videos.

== Unite the Right rally attendance and doxing ==
Colligan participated in the torchlight tiki rally at the 2017 Unite the Right rally in Charlottesville. Shortly following the rally, one of Colligan's former Boston neighbors and friends noticed Colligan in the evening's most infamous photograph. His identity was later verified through social network posts, including a cropped driver's license photograph that contained a photo appearing to be Colligan along with his correct birthday.

Following Colligan's doxxing, Colligan initially responded with jabs, such as posting his "real" home address as what was in fact a Jewish synagogue in Boston. Shortly thereafter, Colligan deleted his Twitter account.

On Friday, August 11, 2017, the day of the tiki rally, Colligan and Baked Alaska were ejected by a black Uber driver who said they had said racist things, calling the country "white America" and making her feel unsafe.

In September 2017, Colligan claimed to have moved to Japan, but later claimed to have been living in Mexico.

== Social media ==
Colligan spent several years leading up to the Unite the Right rally posting white nationalist advocacy and neo-Nazi slogans such as "Hitler did nothing wrong". He was friends with and often interacted online with Baked Alaska. During one 52-minute video, Colligan questioned the history of the Holocaust, suggesting that his viewers search for "revisionist histories" instead.

Following Unite the Right, Colligan joined The Gateway Pundit's Lucian Wintrich and right-wing activist Ali Alexander on the Pundit's podcast. During this podcast, the group discussed Unite the Right, Richard Spencer, and the distinction between the New Right and the alt-right. During the show, Colligan described white nationalist Richard B. Spencer as a "good guy", showed Nazi flags and "Hitler did nothing wrong" memes, and argued that he himself was not a member of the alt-right. Akbar described Colligan as "a little bit racist" but "so funny" in a now-deleted Periscope video promoting the dialogue.

Nick Fuentes, a far-right podcaster and figurehead of the Groypers, listed Colligan as having a TikTok account affiliated with "America First", a TikTok-based movement described as white nationalist by Right Wing Watch. TikTok suspended Colligan's account in May 2020 during a crackdown on hate speech.

== Post-Charlottesville events ==
In June 2020, Colligan joined two other groypers, leader Nick Fuentes and far-right student organizer Jaden McNeil, at a George Floyd protest in Queen Creek, Arizona. After the group asked two black men to take a picture with them while holding a sign labeled 'I can't read', they escalated tensions. One demonstrator tried to take the sign away, and another removed Colligan's glasses, at which point Colligan called the police saying he had been "physically assaulted." Fuentes told one demonstrator the police would "kneel on that guy's neck for taking my friend[']s glasses", referencing the manner in which George Floyd was murdered. Following the event, several protesters were harassed online, leading them to delete social media accounts.

Indian-American scientist and conspiracy theorist Shiva Ayyadurai appeared with Colligan on a livestream during his 2018 Massachusetts election campaign against Elizabeth Warren. Colligan requested that Ayyadurai bless a small statue of the Kek, the green frog that came to prominence as a symbol of the alt-right during the 2016 United States presidential election. Ayyadurai obliged and described Colligan as "one of our greatest supporters".
