= XCP =

XCP is a three-letter abbreviation which may refer to:

- Copper, the ISO 4217 code for trading the metal
- Extended Copy Protection, a CD copy protection technique used on some Sony CD albums
- Xen Cloud Platform, open-source virtualization software
- Xavier College Preparatory (Arizona)
- Universal Measurement and Calibration Protocol, ASAM e.V. standard abbreviated XCP
- The native currency of Counterparty
- Jabber XCP, a commercial product which is an implementation of XMPP, acquired by Cisco Systems in 2008.
