= Shiva Ayyadurai =

American engineer, conspiracy theorist, and entrepreneur

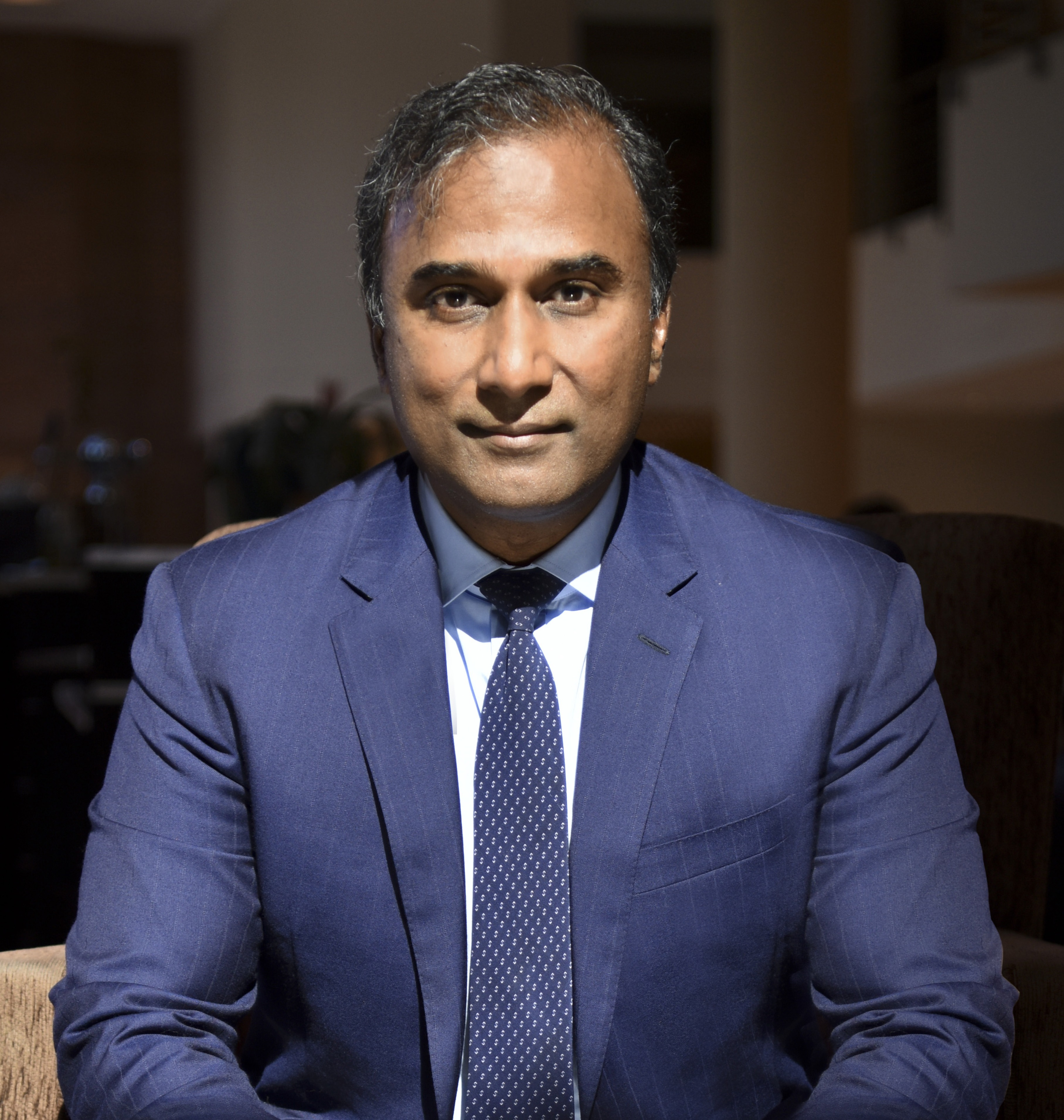
- Ayyadurai in 2024
- Born: Vellayappa Ayyadurai Shiva; December 2, 1963 (age 62); Bombay, India
- Education: Massachusetts Institute of Technology (BS, MS, MEng, PhD)
- Political party: Independent (before 2020, 2023–present)
- Other political affiliations: Republican (2020–2023)
- Partner: Fran Drescher (2014–2016)
- Scientific career
- Fields: Systems biology Computer science Scientific visualization
- Doctoral advisor: Forbes Dewey
- Other academic advisors: Robert S. Langer
- Website: vashiva.com

V. A. Shiva Ayyadurai (born Vellayappa Ayyadurai Shiva on December 2, 1963) is an American engineer, entrepreneur, and anti-vaccine activist. He has become known for promoting conspiracy theories, pseudoscience, and unfounded medical claims. Ayyadurai holds four degrees from the Massachusetts Institute of Technology (MIT), including a PhD in biological engineering, and is a Fulbright grant recipient.

In a 2011 article published by Time, Ayyadurai claimed to have invented email as a teenager; in August 1982, he registered the copyright on an email application he had written, asserting in his copyright filing, "I, personally, feel EMAIL is as sophisticated as any electronic mail system on the market today." Historians strongly dispute this account because email was already in use in the early 1970s. Ayyadurai sued Gawker Media and Techdirt for defamation for disputing his account of inventing email; both lawsuits were settled out of court. Ayyadurai and Techdirt agreed to Techdirt's articles remaining online with a link to Ayyadurai's rebuttal on his own website.

Ayyadurai also attracted attention for two reports: the first questioning the working conditions of India's largest scientific agency; the second questioning the safety of genetically modified food, such as soybeans. During the COVID-19 pandemic, Ayyadurai became known for a social media COVID-19 disinformation campaign, spreading conspiracy theories about the cause of COVID-19, promoting unfounded COVID-19 treatments, and campaigning to fire Anthony Fauci for allegedly being a deep state actor.

Ayyadurai garnered 3.39% of the vote as an independent candidate in the 2018 U.S. Senate election in Massachusetts, and ran for the Republican Party nomination in the 2020 U.S. Senate election in Massachusetts but lost to Kevin O'Connor in the primary. After the election, he promoted false claims of election fraud.

In 2024, Ayyadurai launched a campaign to be the president of the United States. However, because he is not a natural-born American citizen, he is ineligible to serve as president.

== Early life and education ==
Shiva Ayyadurai was born Vellayappa Ayyadurai Shiva in 1963, in Bombay (now Mumbai), India. He grew up in the Muhavur village in Rajapalayam, Tamil Nadu. At the age of seven, he left with his family to live in the United States. He was raised in Livingston, New Jersey.

In 1978, as a 14-year-old high school student, Ayyadurai attended a summer program at the Courant Institute of Mathematical Sciences of New York University (NYU) to study computer programming. While a student at Livingston High School in New Jersey, Ayyadurai volunteered at the University of Medicine and Dentistry of New Jersey (UMDNJ) where his mother worked. While there Leslie Michelson asked him to set up an electronic messaging system for 100 users at the medical school. In 1982, he registered the copyright for the source code and user documentation of the FORTRAN program called EMAIL.

Ayyadurai's undergraduate degree from MIT was in electrical engineering and computer science; he took a master's degree in visual studies from the MIT Media Laboratory on scientific visualization; concurrently, he completed another master's degree in mechanical engineering, also from MIT; and in 2007, he obtained a PhD in biological engineering from MIT in systems biology, with his thesis focusing on modeling the whole cell by integrating molecular pathway models. In 2007, he was awarded a Fulbright U.S. Student Program grant to study the integration of Siddha, a system of traditional medicine developed in South India, with modern systems biology.

== Early career ==
=== Millennium Cybernetics ===
In 1994, Ayyadurai founded a company called Millennium Cybernetics, which produces email management software originally called Xiva and now called EchoMail. The software analyzes incoming email messages to organizations before either replying automatically or forwarding it to the most relevant department. By 2001, customers included Kmart, American Express, and Calvin Klein, as well as more than thirty U.S. senators to help handle constituent email. EchoMail competed with more established customer relationship management software that had an email component.

=== CSIR India ===
In 2009, Ayyadurai was hired by India's Council of Scientific and Industrial Research (CSIR), India's largest science agency, by its director general, Samir K. Brahmachari. CSIR was mandated to create a new company, CSIR Tech, that would establish businesses using the research conducted by the country's many publicly owned laboratories. Ayyadurai reported that he had spent months trying to create a business plan for CSIR Tech, but received no response from Brahmachari. Ayyadurai then distributed a draft plan, which was not authorized by CSIR, to the agency's scientists that requested feedback and criticized management. His job offer was subsequently withdrawn five months after the position was offered.

Brahmachari said that "the offer was withdrawn as [Ayyadurai] did not accept the terms and conditions and demanded unreasonable compensation." In its report, The New York Times said that "going public with such accusations is highly unusual. Mr. Ayyadurai circulated his paper not just to the agency's scientists but to journalists, and wrote about his situation to Prime Minister Manmohan Singh." In that letter, Ayyadurai said his report was intended to explore institutional barriers to CSIR's entrepreneurial mandate. He said that CSIR scientists reported that "they work in a medieval, feudal environment" that required a "major overhaul". The letter was co-authored by a colleague, Deepak Sardana. Pushpa Bhargava, founding director of the CSIR's Centre for Cellular and Molecular Biology in Hyderabad, endorsed the letter, calling Ayyadurai's sacking the worst of many cases he had seen of "vindictiveness in the CSIR" and accused CSIR administration of being "impervious to healthy and fair criticism". The incident was seen as an example of the difficulty some Indian expatriate professionals may encounter returning home after growing accustomed to the more direct management style of the U.S.

=== Genetically modified food ===
In 2015, Ayyadurai published a paper that applied systems biology, which uses mathematical modeling, to predict the chemical composition of genetically modified (GM) soybeans, and whether or not they were substantially equivalent to unmodified soybeans. The paper claimed that GM soybeans have lower levels of the antioxidant glutathione and higher levels of carcinogenic formaldehyde, making the modified soybean substantially different, contrary to previous safety assessments. Shortly after publication, Ayyadurai embarked on a speaking tour of the U.S. At the National Press Club, he said that genetic modification had "fundamentally modified the metabolic system of the soy", disrupting the "beautiful way of detoxifying [formaldehyde]" present in non-GM soy.

The European Food Safety Agency evaluated the paper and determined that "the author's conclusions are not supported" due to the lack of information on the input into the model, the fact that the model was not validated and because no measurements of soybeans were made to establish whether GM soy actually contained elevated levels of formaldehyde. Plant scientist Kevin Folta noted that there was "no evidence ever published ... that shows a difference in formaldehyde between GM and non-GM varieties". Ayyadurai later cited the study as evidence of a lack of safety standards for GM foods and bet Monsanto a $10 million building if they could prove that they were safe. Monsanto did not take up the challenge but stated that GM food did indeed undergo safety assessments that "are more rigorous and thorough than assessments of any other food crop in history". In 2016, Ayyadurai promised to donate $10 million to Hillary Clinton's presidential campaign if she could disprove his research.

== Political career ==
On March 17, 2017, Ayyadurai filed as a Republican candidate in the 2018 United States Senate election in Massachusetts, running against incumbent Elizabeth Warren. He ran as an independent and placed third with 3.4% of the votes.

Ayyadurai said that Senator Warren was at the top of a U.S. "neo–caste system" composed of "academics, career politicians and lawyer/lobbyists", a "spineless clan" who never expect to be challenged. He said he would take a science and engineering perspective on problem solving, focusing on immigration, education and innovation. He called for secure borders and an end to sanctuary cities, support for more choices in public education, and for more scrutiny of "pay-to-play" science research. Ayyadurai has accused Warren of voting in favor of the Farmer Assurance Provision and against a GM labeling bill sponsored by Senator Bernie Sanders of Vermont. However, the Act was reportedly passed to avoid a government shutdown, and Warren petitioned the Food and Drug Administration for "regulations to ensure that the labeling of GMO products is fair, standardized and transparent".

In August 2017, Ayyadurai spoke at the Boston Free Speech rally, a gathering whose speaker line-up included right-wing extremists, and which drew large counter-protests. Ayyadurai later disputed how the event was characterized, tweeting that the "establishment" wanted to block attendance and media coverage and sought a "Race War to divide us". In April 2018, the city of Cambridge threatened Ayyadurai with daily fines for an alleged zoning code violation if he did not remove a banner on his campaign bus. The banner featured his campaign slogan, "Only a real Indian can defeat a fake Indian", together with a digitally altered image depicting Warren in a Native American headdress, a reference to her claim to be of part Cherokee descent. The city reversed its position the following month and Ayyadurai, in turn, dropped a lawsuit alleging that his free speech rights had been violated. During the campaign, Ayyadurai appeared on a livestream with Matthew Colligan, a white supremacist known for his participation in the 2017 Unite the Right rally. Colligan requested that Ayyadurai bless a small statue of Kek, the green frog that came to prominence as a symbol of the alt-right during the 2016 United States presidential election. Ayyadurai obliged and described Colligan as "one of our greatest supporters". Ayyadurai also sold pins promoting his campaign that featured a brown-skinned variant of the "Groyper", the namesake and mascot for white nationalist group Groypers which Colligan is affiliated with. Ayyadurai also tweeted on one occasion (and separately retweeted another tweet including) the hashtag "#WWG1WGA", a slogan associated with the QAnon conspiracy theory.

Ayyadurai ran unsuccessfully for the Republican nomination in the 2020 U.S. Senate election in Massachusetts. By August 2020, Ayyadurai's campaign had spent $1.4 million, including $1.05 million of Ayyadurai's own funds. After Kevin J. O'Conner won 158,590 votes to Ayyadurai's 104,782, Ayyadurai alleged that over one million ballots had been destroyed and that the state had committed election fraud. He alleged that ballot images had to be preserved for 22 months and were now missing. However, MIT political science professor Charles Stewart stated that federal law only requires that physical ballots be stored. Harvard law professor Nicholas Stephanopoulos disputed Ayyadurai's allegation of fraud and a spokesperson for the state accused him of spreading misinformation. Fact checkers at Reuters and the Associated Press labelled the allegations as false. On February 1, 2021, Ayyadurai was suspended from Twitter. On February 3, he filed a lawsuit against Massachusetts politician William Galvin and other Massachusetts election officials, alleging that they were responsible for Twitter's suspending him. On August 10, Ayyadurai dropped the lawsuit along with an October 2020 suit against Galvin.

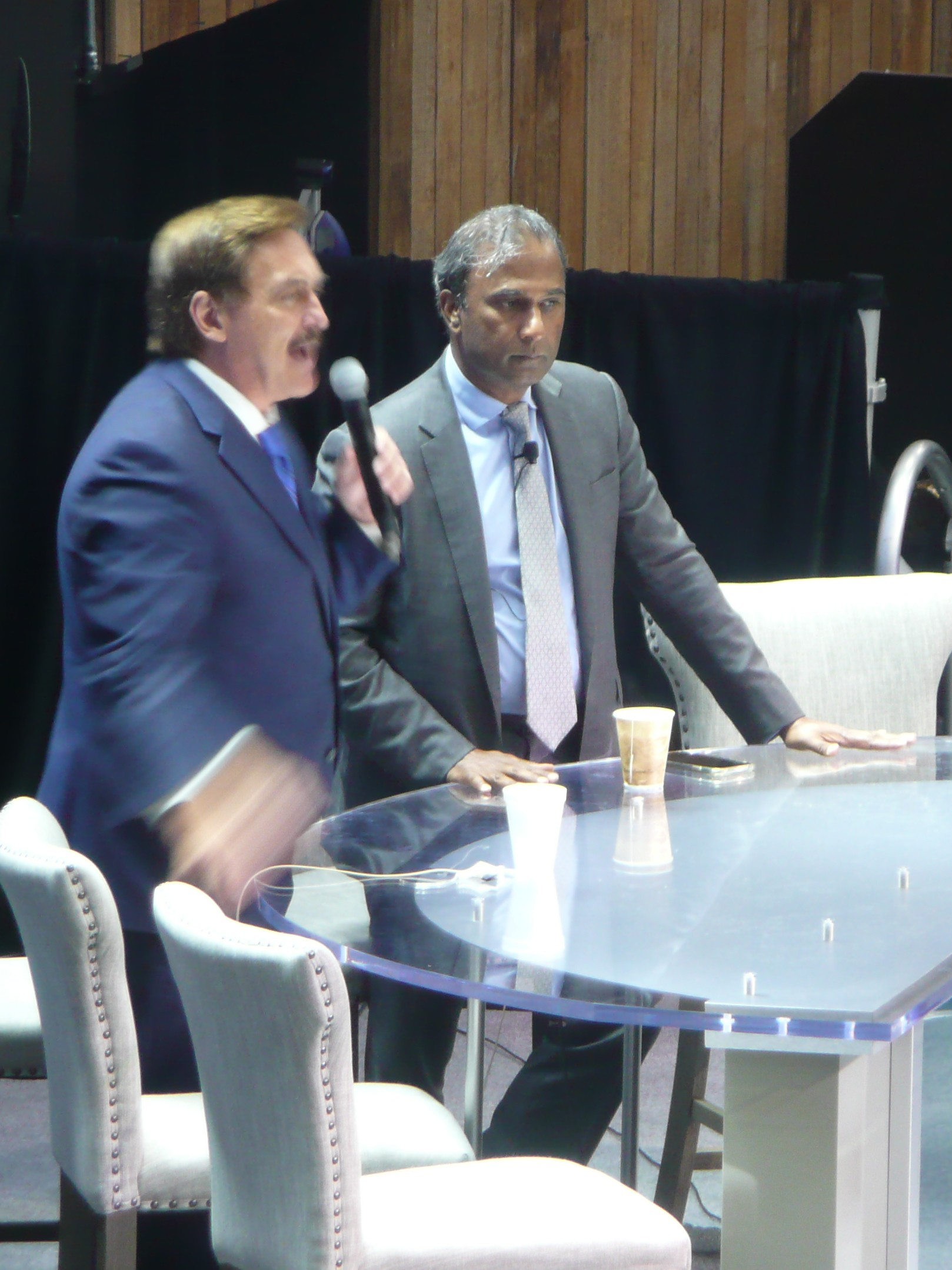
Mike Lindell introduces Ayyadurai at Lindell's "Cyber Symposium"

He announced a run for the 2022 Massachusetts gubernatorial election in December 2021, but never filed for the primary.

He intended to run in the 2024 United States presidential election as an independent. Ayyadurai, who is not a natural-born citizen of the United States, is constitutionally ineligible to serve as president and was excluded from ballots. He simultaneously intended to run to be a US Senator from Massachusetts but was not on the ballot.

On January 27, 2026, Ayyadurai again filed to run in the 2026 U.S. Senate election in Massachusetts. He filed to run for president in the 2028 U.S. presidential election three days later.

=== COVID-19 misinformation ===
During the COVID-19 pandemic, Ayyadurai used social media to spread various conspiracy theories and misinformation about the pandemic. In January 2020, he claimed that COVID-19 was patented by the Pirbright Institute, but the patent he referenced relates to avian coronavirus, which infects birds, not SARS-CoV-2, the virus responsible for the pandemic. Ayyadurai defined COVID-19 as "an overactive dysfunctional immune system that overreacts and that's what causes damage to the body", and claimed that vitamin C could be used to treat it.

He alleged that COVID-19 was spread by the "deep state" and accused Anthony Fauci, director of the National Institute of Allergy and Infectious Diseases, of being a "Deep State Plant". Ayyadurai called for Fauci to be fired and his supporters lobbied for Fauci to be replaced by Ayyadurai.

In March 2020, Ayyadurai published an open letter to then-U.S. President Donald Trump, writing that a national lockdown was unnecessary and advocated that large doses of vitamins could prevent and cure COVID-19. In April 2020, Politico and Vanity Fair reported that QAnon supporter DeAnna Lorraine recommended that Ayyadurai be included in COVID-19 discussions at Donald Trump's White House.

=== Election misinformation ===
Ayyadurai has continued to spread misinformation since about the 2020 presidential election. At Mike Lindell's Cyber Symposium in August 2021, he claimed there were "serious issues" in the election process involving voting machines able to "multiply a vote by a factor" and that states were illegally not "saving ballot images". In fact, not all states are legally required to store ballot images. In August 2021, he was hired by the Arizona Senate—as part of the controversial 2021 Maricopa County presidential ballot audit—to "review signatures on the envelopes of 1.9 million early ballots sent to [Maricopa] county". In late September, he remotely attended the Arizona state senate presentation of the review's findings where he questioned the validity of some signatures on mail ballot envelopes, and criticized and gave a presentation filled with misrepresentations about the county's signature verification process.

== EMAIL invention controversy ==
Ayyadurai is notable for his widely disputed claim of being the "inventor of email". His claim is based on an electronic mail software called EMAIL, an implementation of interoffice email system, which he wrote as a 14-year-old student at Livingston High School, New Jersey, in 1979. (Note: Some sources claim 1978, the year Ayyadurai was introduced to computing and programming through New York University's Courant Institute summer program.) Initial reports that repeated Ayyadurai's assertion—from organizations such as The Washington Post and the Smithsonian Institution—were followed by public retractions. These corrections were triggered by objections from historians and ARPANET pioneers who cited the fact the history of email dated back to the early 1970s. Ayyadurai started a campaign in 2011 in which he rebranded himself as the "Inventor of Email"; according to a paper published in Information & Culture, he "provoked a dramatic succession of exaggerated claims, credulous reporters, retractions, and accusations that a cabal of industry insiders and corrupt Wikipedia editors are colluding to hide the truth."

A November 2011 Time Techland interview by Doug Aamoth, entitled "The Man Who Invented Email", argued that EMAIL represented the birth of email "as we currently know it". In that interview, Ayyadurai recalled that Les Michelson, the former particle scientist at Brookhaven National Labs who assigned Ayyadurai the project, had the idea of creating an electronic mail system that uses the header conventions of a hardcopy memorandum. Ayyadurai recalled Michelson as saying: "Your job is to convert that into an electronic format. Nobody's done that before."

In February 2012, the Smithsonian National Museum of American History announced that Ayyadurai had donated "a trove of documents and code" related to EMAIL. Initially, the museum—inaccurately—cited the program as one of the first to include the now common "subject and body fields, inboxes, outboxes, cc, bcc, attachments, and others. He based these elements directly off of the interoffice mail memos the doctors had been using for years, in hopes of convincing people to actually use the newfangled technology."

Ayyadurai's claims drew editorial clarifications and corrections, as well as criticism from industry observers. In a followup to its acquisition announcement, the Smithsonian stated that it was not claiming that Ayyadurai had invented email, but rather that the materials were historically notable for other reasons related to trends in computer education and the role of computers in medicine. The Smithsonian statement distinguished Ayyadurai's achievement by noting that historians in the field, "have largely focused on the use of large networked computers, especially those linked to the ARPANET in the early 1970s". The statement observed that Ayyadurai's approach instead "focused on communications between linked computer terminals in an ordinary office situation". The Washington Post also followed up with a correction of errors in its earlier report on the Smithsonian acquisition, stating that it incorrectly referred to Ayyadurai as the inventor of electronic messaging; the 'bcc', 'cc', 'to' and 'from' fields existed previously; Ayyadurai had not been honored as the "inventor of email".

Writing for Gizmodo, Sam Biddle argued that email was developed a decade before EMAIL, beginning with Ray Tomlinson's sending the first text letter between two ARPANET-connected computers in 1971. Biddle quoted Tomlinson: "[We] had most of the headers needed to deliver the message (to:, cc:, etc.) as well as identifying the sender (from:) and when the message was sent (date:) and what the message was about." Biddle allowed for the possibility that Ayyadurai may have coined the term "EMAIL" and used the header terms without being aware of earlier work, but maintained that the historical record isn't definitive on either point. Biddle wrote that "laying claim to the name of a product that's the generic term for a universal technology gives you acres of weasel room. But creating a type of airplane named AIRPLANE doesn't make you Wilbur Wright."

Thomas Haigh, a historian of information technology at the University of Wisconsin–Milwaukee, wrote that "Ayyadurai is, to the best of my knowledge, the only person to have claimed for him or herself the title 'inventor of email'." Haigh argued that while EMAIL was impressive for a teenager's work, it contained no features that were not present on previous electronic mail systems and had no obvious influence on later systems. "The most striking thing about Ayyadurai's claim to have invented electronic mail is how late it comes. Somehow it took him thirty years to alert the world to [his] greatest achievement". Haigh wrote that by 1980, "electronic mail had been in use at MIT for 15 years, Xerox had built a modern, mouse-driven graphical email system for office communication, Compuserve was selling email access to the public, and email had for many years been the most popular application on what was soon to become the Internet." Haigh wrote that Ayyadurai had created "infographic" outlines for his view of history and published the assembled documents under various domain names that he had registered to support his claim. Through his infographics, wrote Haigh, Ayyadurai presented his claims that he "designed and deployed the first version of electronic [mail] system" in 1980, although electronic mail as an executable program was used under the name "Electronic Mail System" before.

David Crocker, a member of the ARPANET research community, writing in the Post, said, "The reports incorrectly credited [EMAIL's] author, a 14-year-old in the late 1970s, as the 'inventor' of email, long after it had become an established service on the ARPANET." Another computer historian, Marc Weber, a curator at the Computer History Museum, said that by 1978, "nearly all the features we're familiar with today had appeared on one system or another over the previous dozen years", including emoticons, mailing lists, and spam mail.

After the controversy unfolded, MIT disassociated itself from Ayyadurai's EMAIL Lab and funding was dropped. MIT also revoked Ayyadurai's contract to lecture at the bioengineering department.

Ayyadurai characterized the earlier work of Tomlinson, Tom Van Vleck and others as text messaging, rather than an electronic version of an interoffice mail system. Responding to his critics on his personal website, Ayyadurai described EMAIL as "the first of its kind—a fully integrated, database-driven, electronic translation of the interoffice paper mail system derived from the ordinary office situation." He maintained that EMAIL was the first electronic mail system to integrate an easy-to-use user interface, a word processor, a relational database, and a modular inter-communications protocol "integrated together in one single and holistic platform to ensure high-reliability and user-friendliness network-wide." Ayyadurai presented a press release on his webpage asserting that his undergraduate professor Noam Chomsky, of MIT's Department of Linguistics and Philosophy, also supported his claims.

According to various historians, Ayyadurai honed his claims appeal to those with particular political leanings by arguing that his achievements are overlooked due to "racism, anti-immigrant prejudice, historians in the pay of big business, and a belief that only elite and well-funded institutions can create innovations." In March 2016, Ayyadurai complained about Raytheon, where Tomlinson worked on ARPANET. After Tomlinson's death, Ayyadurai told The Hindu that he believed that news outlets retracted their stories about him because, "Raytheon advertises in publications like the Huffington Post and CNN" and that if he were "a white guy and had a copyright for email, I would have my photo on every stamp in the world." The day after Tomlinson's death, Ayyadurai tweeted: "I'm the low-caste, dark-skinned, Indian, who DID invent #email. Not Raytheon, who profits for war & death. Their mascot Tomlinson dies a liar".

=== Gawker ===
In May 2016, Ayyadurai filed suit against Gawker Media for $35 million, alleging that their website Gawker published "false and defamatory statements", causing "substantial damage to Dr. Ayyadurai's personal and professional reputation and career". The filing also named writer Sam Biddle, executive editor John Cook, and Gawker founder and CEO Nick Denton. Gawker Media responded that, "These claims to have invented email have been repeatedly debunked by the Smithsonian Institute [sic], Gizmodo, the Washington Post and others."

In November 2016, the by-then-bankrupt Gawker Media settled the lawsuit with Ayyadurai for $750,000 as part of a broader settlement with wrestler Hulk Hogan and journalist Ashley Terrill, all of whom were represented by attorney Charles Harder. In a statement, Ayyadurai said that "history will reflect that this settlement is a victory for truth". Biddle denounced the settlement and said he fully stood by his reporting. Denton wrote that "we expected to prevail" in the Ayyadurai and Terrill lawsuits, "but all-out legal war with" billionaire Peter Thiel, who financially backed Harder, was untenable in terms of cost, time and human toll.

Katie Hafner, the author of several books on Internet history—including one on the development of ARPANET email—said, "This situation is both bizarre and appalling in that here we are simply trying to get the record straight, and [Ayyadurai has] managed to make money off claims that appear to be misleading."

=== Techdirt ===
In January 2017, Ayyadurai, again represented by Harder, filed a $15 million libel lawsuit on similar grounds against Techdirt founder Mike Masnick and two other parties for a series of articles published beginning in September 2014. In February, Masnick, represented by the firm Prince Lobel, filed two motions to dismiss. One motion argued that the articles were constitutionally protected opinion and written about a public figure without actual malice. The second motion asked for dismissal under California's anti-SLAPP law that compensates defendants for some legal expenses.

In September 2017, United States District Judge F. Dennis Saylor dismissed the defamation claims against Techdirt, but declined to strike the complaint under the anti-SLAPP law. In his ruling, Saylor wrote that definitions of "email" vary widely. Therefore, "whether plaintiff's claim to have invented e-mail is 'fake' depends upon the operative definition of 'e-mail.' Because the definition does not have a single, objectively correct answer, the claim is incapable of being proved true or false."

The two parties filed cross-appeals with the U.S. Court of Appeals for the First Circuit but settled out of court in May 2019, with each side agreeing to pay their own legal costs and Techdirt's articles to remain online with an added link to a rebuttal on Ayyadurai's website.

== Personal life ==
Beginning in 2014, Ayyadurai was romantically connected with actress Fran Drescher. On September 7, 2014, Ayyadurai and Drescher participated in a ceremony at Drescher's beach house. Both tweeted that they had gotten married, and the event was widely reported as such. Ayyadurai later said it was not "a formal wedding or marriage", but a celebration of their "friendship in a spiritual ceremony with close friends and her family". The couple split up in September 2016.

== Books ==
- V. A. Shiva (1997). The Internet Publicity Guide: How to Maximize Your Marketing and Promotion in Cyberspace. New York: Allworth Press. ISBN 978-1880559604.
- V. A. Shiva Ayyadurai (2017). All-American Indian: This Fight Is Your Fight—The Battle to Save America from the Elites Who Think They Know Better. General Interactive, LLC. ISBN 978-0998504926.
