= Matt Furie =

American comics artist (born 1979)

- Born: August 14, 1979 (age 47); Columbus, Ohio, U.S.
- Education: Ohio Wesleyan University
- Occupations: Visual artist; illustrator; NFT Artist
- Years active: 2000s–present
- Known for: Creating Pepe the Frog, NFTs (hacked)
- Partner: Aiyana Udesen
- Children: 1
- Website: mattfurie.com

Matt Furie (born August 14, 1979) is an American visual artist and illustrator. He is known for creating Pepe the Frog, a character from his Boy's Club series that debuted in 2005. The anthropomorphic character became a popular Internet meme in the late 2000s and early 2010s. He has launched a number of projects in the NFT space, which currently remain exploited with countless counterfeit tokens flooding the marketplace, and collection necessitative image hosting having since been allowed to expire.

Furie is from Columbus, Ohio, and graduated from Ohio Wesleyan University. In addition to the Boy's Club series, he has created paintings and published the children's book The Night Riders (2012), and the books Mindviscosity (2020), and Trigore Labyrinth (2023).

== Early life and education ==
Matt Furie was born on August 14, 1979, in Columbus, Ohio. His great-grandfather was from Sicily. He attended summer classes at the Columbus College of Art and Design and then studied art at Ohio Wesleyan University, earning his BFA in 2001.

Following his graduation, Furie moved to San Francisco where he worked in the toy department of the store Community Thrift.

== Art and comics ==
Furie has produced comics and paintings since the early 2000s. His artwork has been described as mixing psychedelic imagery with the "charming spontaneity of children's drawings". His creations include "twisted versions" of characters from pop culture. He once described his style as "kind of a mix between Bosch and Breughel and then, like, the Muppets and the Simpsons." Furie has exhibited his work in the United States and Europe. He received a Goldie award for best visual artist from the San Francisco Bay Guardian.

=== Boy's Club ===
Furie created the anthropomorphic amphibian character Pepe the Frog around 2004, first appearing as a character in his zine Play Time in single-pane comics created using Microsoft Paint. The character was a "peaceful frog-dude" with three animal roommates. He posted the comic in a series of blog posts on Myspace in 2005. His comic book Boy's Club #1 was published by Tim Goodyear's Teenage Dinosaur in 2006.

The Pepe the Frog character became a popular Internet meme by 2008. Furie's comics were printed in color in the magazine The Believer. He continued producing Boy's Club until 2012, with Boy's Club #2 and Boy's Club #3 both published by Buenaventura Press. Furie licensed Pepe the Frog for use in playing cards, a clothing line, indie video games, and a plush toy. He later published Pepe comics with the website The Nib in 2015 and 2016. For the April 2017 issue of Mad magazine, Furie created a version of Alfred E. Neuman as Pepe the Frog.

In 2012, Furie published the illustrated children's book The Night Riders. The dialogue-less book, published by McSweeney's, concerns the nighttime stroll of a frog and a rat.

=== Memefication of Pepe the Frog ===
By 2014, memes involving Pepe the Frog had become popular on the internet forums 4chan and 8chan. While most instances of Pepe were not used in a hate-related context, the character was co-opted as a mascot by the alt-right movement and by white nationalists and was used in memes supporting white supremacist and neo-Nazi ideologies. Pepe's image was also used in 2016 by supporters of Donald Trump's campaign for president. Trump himself and his son Donald Trump Jr. both shared memes using the character in social media posts.

The Anti-Defamation League designated Pepe the Frog a hate symbol in September 2016. Furie expressed dismay at his character being used as a hate symbol and started a campaign to reclaim it, saying, "ultimately, I hope Pepe will live on as a symbol of peacefulness and of being a cool, chill frog that kids like to share with each other on the Internet." He led a #SavePepe hashtag campaign and depicted Pepe having nightmares about his transformation into a symbol of hate in one of his comics. In 2017, he wrote a storyline for the comic where Pepe dies and is given a funeral.

=== Lawsuits involving Pepe the Frog ===
To counter the use of Pepe the Frog as a hate symbol, Furie partnered with the law firm WilmerHale and lawyer Louis W. Tompros. They pursued copyright infringement cases against commercial uses of Pepe, using the Digital Millennium Copyright Act and cease and desist letters. Among the first works to be challenged for copyright infringement was Eric Hauser's 2017 children's book The Adventures of Pepe and Pede, a book using the Pepe character that had "racist, Islamophobic and hate-filled themes". In August 2017, Hauser was forced to stop selling the book and donate proceeds to the Council on American-Islamic Relations.

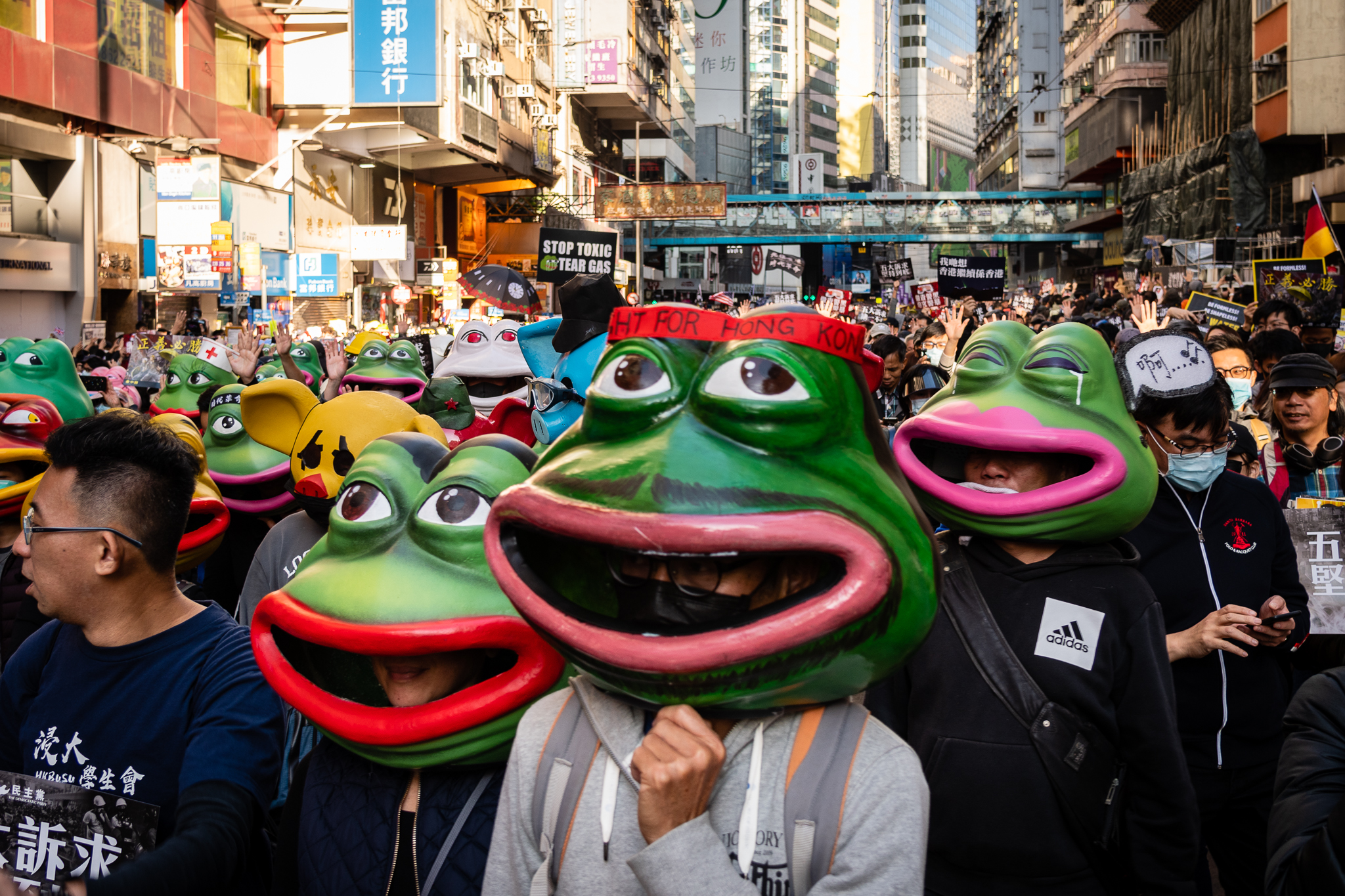
Protesters in Hong Kong in 2019 with Pepe the Frog masks

Furie sued the news website InfoWars in March 2018 for copyright infringement for its use of an image of Pepe the Frog in a poster that it sold on its website. In a settlement, InfoWars agreed to pay $15,000 for its use of the image. Furie announced his intentions to donate the proceeds to the amphibian conservation organization Save the Frogs. Furie also filed lawsuits preventing the sale of Pepe-related merchandise by the neo-Nazi website The Daily Stormer and the subreddit r/The_Donald, and pursued legal remedies against prominent alt-right figures who were using Pepe images, including Richard B. Spencer, Baked Alaska, and Mike Cernovich. Furie settled a copyright infringement lawsuit against Jessica Logsdon, who produced paintings including images of a rifle-wielding, masked Pepe in front of the White House and a Pepe aiming a gun over a U.S. border wall.

In 2019, Pepe the Frog became a symbol of the 2019–2020 Hong Kong protests in a context apart from U.S. politics.

=== Matt Furie NFT Collections ===
Matt Furie has been prolific in the NFT space Partnering with cousin Frank Musarra aka "Chain/Saw" to launch a number of 1/1 and timed open edition collections between 2021 and 2025. Beginning with Genesis Pepe, a digitized scan of the Feels Good Man comic. Continuing with Pegz, Hedz, Rare Pepes (not to be confused with the trading card NFTs of the same name), Pepe Open Editions, Zogz, Peplicator, and culminating in the Replicandy mint in 2025. During the mint of Replicandy, a number of these collections were exploited, flooding marketplaces with fraudulent nfts to extract funds as buyers remained unaware. In now deleted tweets, Chain/saw claimed this to be executed by "known parties". Crypto Sleuth ZachXBT has stated that a North Korean hacker was accidentally hired. To date there has been no resolution, and no further update provided to collectors by Furie or Musarra.

=== Later works ===
Furie and his partner exhibited their works at the Left Field Gallery in 2018. He was the subject of the 2020 documentary film Feels Good Man. Furie's 2020 book Mindviscosity was published with Fantagraphics. In 2023, he published the book Trigore Labyrinth, a collaboration with artists Skinner and Will Sweeney.

== Personal life ==
Furie lives in Los Angeles. He and his partner, artist Aiyana Udesen, have a daughter.
