= Louis W. Tompros =

American lawyer and academic

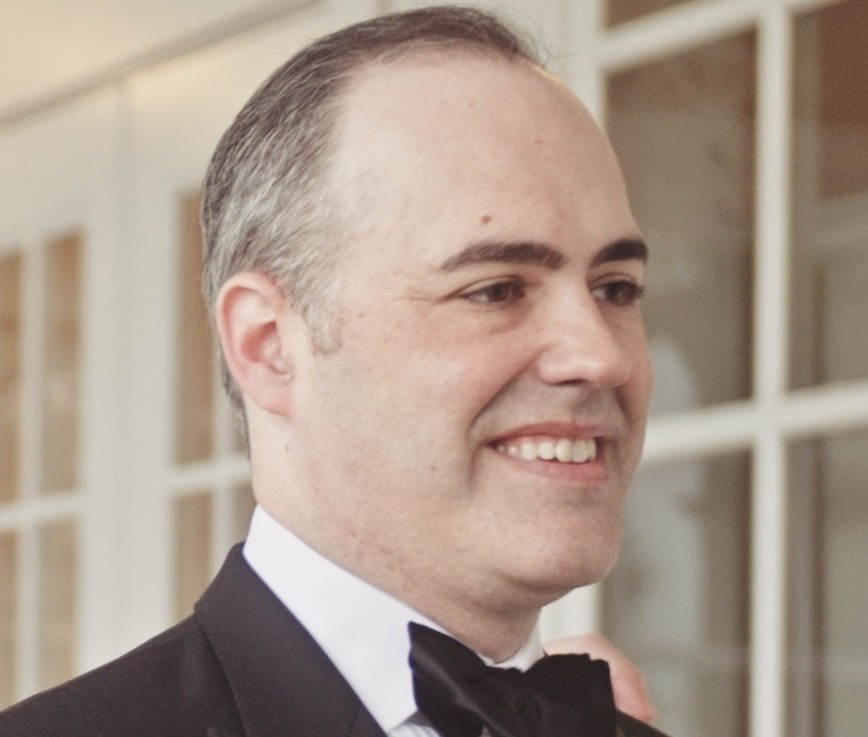
- Born: United States
- Education: Yale University (BA); Harvard Law School (JD)
- Occupation: Lawyer
- Years active: 2004–present
- Known for: Pepe the Frog case Queen of Christmas case

Louis W. Tompros is an American lawyer and academic. He is currently a faculty member of the Harvard Law School.

== Early life and education ==
Tompros attended Yale University where he received a BA degree in English in 2000. Later, he was admitted to Harvard Law School where he completed J.D. in 2003. During his time at Harvard, he was a research assistant to Alan Dershowitz and Charles Nesson and won Ames Moot Court Competition.

== Career ==
After his graduation from law school, Tompros clerked for Robert J. Cordy and later, for Richard Linn. He was admitted to the bar in 2003. The following year, he became an associate at WilmerHale. Tompros became a partner at WilmerHale in 2012.

In 2004, in a lawsuit, he represented LGBT service members challenging the military Don't Ask, Don't Tell policy alongside Servicemembers Legal Defense Network. Later, in connection with the Volunteer Lawyers for the Arts, he represented the artist Winsom after her artwork was damaged by a museum.

In 2014, Tompros respresented Intel and Broadcom in winning patent cases. In 2019, he defended Bombardier Recreational Products in a $130 million trademark case brought by Jaguar Land Rover.

In June 2019, Tompros helped Matt Furie win his copyright lawsuit against Alex Jones website, InfoWars, who were using his creation, Pepe the Frog.

In August 2022, Tompros represented artist Ryder Ripps in a trademark lawsuit filed against him by Yuga Labs, the parent company of the Bored Ape Yacht Club NFT. In April 2023, the U.S. District Court for the Central District of California granted summary judgment in favor of Yuga Labs, finding that Ripps and co-defendant Jeremy Cahen had infringed Yuga’s trademarks by selling "RR/BAYC" NFTs in a manner likely to confuse consumers, and awarded over $1.5 million in damages, later increased to nearly $9 million including attorneys’ fees. Tompros led the appeal to the United States Court of Appeals for the Ninth Circuit. On July 23, 2025, the Ninth Circuit reversed the ruling and remanded the case for trial. In an opinion authored by Judge Danielle J. Forrest, the panel found that Yuga Labs had not yet demonstrated that Ripps’ NFT project caused actual consumer confusion, and ruled that summary judgment was therefore improper.

In November 2022, Tompros won a trademark case against singer Mariah Carey, in which the U.S. Patent and Trademark Office denied Carey applications to trademark "Queen of Christmas" and "Princess Christmas".

Tompros currently teaches at Harvard Law School. He also serves as Chair of the Massachusetts Equal Justice Coalition.

== Works ==
- The Rise of Counter-Disinformation Litigation and What It Means for Business (2022)
- The Constitutionality of Criminalizing False Speech Made on Social Networking Sites in a Post-Alvarez, Social Media-Obsessed World, 31 Harv. J.L. & Tech. 66 (2017)

== Awards and recognition ==
- Best Lawyers in America
- Boston Magazine's Lawyer List (2021)
