= Shadilay =

1986 Italian disco song

- Cover art

Single by P.E.P.E.
- A-side: "Shadilay (Vocal)"
- B-side: "Shadilay (Instrumental)"
- Released: March 3, 1986 (Italy); November 23, 2017 (U.S.)
- Genre: Electronic; Italo disco
- Length: 6:06 (vocal extended version); 4:14 (italian version); 4:18 (english version)
- Label: Magic Sound
- Songwriter: Manuele Pepe

Music video
- "Shadilay" on YouTube

"Shadilay" is an Italo disco song by the Italian band P.E.P.E., (Note: P.E.P.E. is an acronym for "Point Emerging Probably Entering") released in 1986 by the music label Magic Sound. It was written by Italian singer-songwriter Marco Ceramicola, who sang under the pseudonym of Manuele Pepe.

It gained attention in 2016 for the band name's similarity to the meme Pepe the Frog, as well as the single's label art also featuring a drawing of a cartoon frog. The label art belongs to Magic Sound, and has been used in multiple songs produced by them, including "Babababo" by Bibox. It has since been used as the anthem for the fictional country of Kekistan. Ceramicola, who had since abandoned his career in the music industry, felt the newfound worldwide audience the song received online to be unexpected.

== Composition ==
"Shadilay" is an electronic Italo disco song. The song's verses are in the key of A minor, while its chorus is in the relative major key C major. It has a moderate tempo of 103 beats per minute. The instrumentation consists of a DX7 Keyboard.

== Track listing ==
12" Single (Magic Sound – MASNP 007)

1. "Shadilay" (Vocal) – 6:06
2. "Shadilay" (Instrumental) – 6:05

== Personnel ==
- Written by Marco Ceramicola
- Lead vocals by Manuele Pepe
- Arranged by Massimo Marcolini
