= Groypers =

Far-right internet group

"Groyper" meme, the group's namesake.

The Groypers, or the Groyper Army, are an informal group of supporters of far-right activist and online streamer Nick Fuentes. They are named after a variant of Pepe the Frog, an Internet meme. Female Groypers are sometimes called Groypettes.

Groypers have attempted to introduce their politics into mainstream conservatism in the United States by various means, and participated in the January 6 United States Capitol attack as well as the protests leading up to it. They have also targeted other conservative groups and individuals whose agendas they view as contrary to the true meaning of "America First". The Groyper movement has been described as racist, nativist, fascist, sexist, homophobic, antisemitic, Islamophobic, and an attempt to rebrand the alt-right movement. It has also been called accelerationist.

What was later dubbed "The Groyper War" began in the fall of 2019, when Fuentes launched a social media campaign targeting Turning Point USA's "Culture War" college tour, led by Charlie Kirk. Enraged by the firing of a Fuentes ally as well as other political conflicts, Groypers disrupted college events by asking provocative questions about immigration, Israel, and LGBT rights, in an attempt to challenge mainstream conservative figures like Kirk, Donald Trump Jr., and Ben Shapiro, whom they labeled "Conservative Inc." The war gained traction after a November 2019 UCLA event where Trump Jr. was cut short by Groyper heckling. Fuentes expanded the movement by forming America First Students in January 2020.

In February 2021, the Groyper movement splintered between Fuentes and Patrick Casey over fears of infiltration by federal informants and doxing at the 2021 America First Political Action Conference. America First Students founder Jaden McNeil joined in support of Fuentes and accused Casey of disloyalty, but later broke ties with Fuentes himself. In August 2024, Fuentes initiated "Groyper War 2", a digital campaign pressuring Donald Trump's presidential campaign to adopt his stances, mainly by using memes as a form of trolling or edgelording.

== Background and ideology ==
=== Origins and symbolism of Groyper meme ===
Fuentes's followers, initially known as "Nickers", began to be known as Groypers by 2019. Groypers are named after a cartoon amphibian named "Groyper", a variant of the Internet meme Pepe the Frog. Groyper is a rotund, green, frog-like creature often depicted sitting with its chin resting on interlocked fingers. Groyper is variously said to be a depiction of Pepe, a character distinct from Pepe but of the same species, or a toad. The Groyper meme was used as early as 2015 and became popular in 2017.

In 2018, a group of computer scientists studying hateful speech on Twitter observed the Groyper image being used frequently in account avatars among accounts identified as "hateful" in their dataset. The researchers observed that the profiles tended to be anonymous and collectively tweeted primarily about politics, race, and religion. They also found that the users were not "lone wolves" and could be identified as a community with a high network centrality. The same year, Right Wing Watch reported that Massachusetts congressional hopeful Shiva Ayyadurai had created a campaign pin featuring a variation of the Groyper image, which RWW described as an attempt to appeal to far-right activists on 4chan, Gab, and Twitter who had adopted the meme.

=== Social media engagement ===
Groypers are very active online, particularly on Twitter, and have engaged in targeted harassment. Financial Times has reported that many Groypers use "deceptively anodyne" Twitter biographies, describing themselves in terms that downplay their extremism, like "Christian conservative".

In April 2020, The Daily Dot reported that Fuentes and other Groypers had begun to move to TikTok, where they streamed live and used the "duet" feature to respond to Trump supporters. Groypers particularly targeted one left-wing teenage girl for harassment, first on TikTok and then on other platforms. Fuentes and some other Groyper accounts were banned from TikTok shortly after the Daily Dot article was published.

=== Relationship with mainstream conservatism ===
Groypers present themselves as defenders of "traditional values", American nationalism and Christian conservatism shaped by Catholicism. Their ideology diverges sharply from mainstream American conservatives, including the Republican Party. Rather than conserving inherited institutions or practicing prudence and incremental reform, Groypers advance a racialized politics that appeal to xenophobia and resentment. They criticize mainstream conservative organizations as insufficiently nationalist and pro-white, and employ tactics of entryism and radicalization such as gradually introducing their targets to increasingly extreme ideas.

Fuentes has said, "We are the right-wing flank of the Republican Party". He has summarized his political ambitions by saying, "We have got to be on the right, dragging [Republicans] kicking and screaming into the future... Into a truly reactionary party". In 2022, Fuentes advocated a "white uprising" to bring Donald Trump back to power and "never leave" and for the U.S. to "stop having elections" and abolish Congress. But less than a year after Trump was reelected, Fuentes said "Trump 2.0 has been a disappointment in literally every way but nobody wants to admit it." He criticized Trump's support of Israel, Trump's failure to release the Epstein Files, and the government's offering of student visas to Chinese nationals, among other things.

=== White nationalism, antisemitism, and social stances ===
Groypers are widely recognized as a white nationalist, antisemitic, and homophobic movement.

Fuentes has said he has been "oppressed" by "the Jews" and blamed the Jewish community for antisemitism, claiming that matters "tend to go from zero to sixty" and that "the reason is them". He has said that matters would get "a lot uglier" for their community if they do not begin to support "people like us". According to the Anti-Defamation League, Groypers accuse mainstream conservatism and liberalism of "destroying white America". Groypers generally support Christian nationalism and oppose feminism, globalization, and LGBTQ rights, but Groypers have been called "surprisingly diverse".

Groypers' questions often focus on United States–Israel relations, immigration policy, affirmative action, and LGBTQ conservatives. They regularly use antisemitic dog whistles, including questions about the USS Liberty incident and references to the "dancing Israelis" conspiracy theory alleging Israeli involvement in the September 11 attacks.

After the assassination of Charlie Kirk in 2025, various online conspiracy theories tied the Groypers to the assassination. Fuentes immediately condemned the shooting and asked his supporters not to "take up arms", saying the situation felt "like a nightmare".

== Groyper War ==
=== Origins ===
In September 2019, Ashley St. Clair, a "brand ambassador" for the conservative student group Turning Point USA, was photographed at an event featuring several allegedly white nationalist and alt-right figures, including Fuentes, Jacob Wohl, and Anthime Gionet, better known as "Baked Alaska". After Right Wing Watch brought the photographs to its attention, TPUSA issued a statement that it had severed ties with St. Clair and condemned white nationalism as "abhorrent and un-American".

At the 2019 Politicon convention, Fuentes tried to attend several Turning Point events featuring Charlie Kirk, including waiting in line to take photos with Kirk and attempting to attend Kirk's debate with Kyle Kulinski. Security repeatedly prevented him from approaching Kirk, and Fuentes accused Kirk of suppressing him to avoid a confrontation, as Fuentes had grown critical of Kirk's positions, which he said were too weak.

In the fall of 2019, Kirk launched a college speaking tour with TPUSA titled "Culture War", featuring himself and guests such as Rand Paul, Donald Trump Jr., Kimberly Guilfoyle, Lara Trump, and Dan Crenshaw. In retaliation for St. Clair's firing and the Politicon incident, Fuentes began organizing a social media campaign asking his followers to go to Kirk's events and ask provocative and controversial leading questions about his stances on immigration, Israel, and LGBT rights to expose Kirk as a "fake conservative".

At a Culture War event hosted by Ohio State University on October 29, 11 out of 14 questions were asked by Groypers. They included "Can you prove that our white European ideals will be maintained if the country is no longer made up of white European descendants?" They asked Kirk's co-host Rob Smith, a gay, black Iraq War veteran, "How does anal sex help us win the culture war?" Fuentes's social media campaign against Kirk became known as the "Groyper Wars". Kirk, Smith, and others at TPUSA, including Benny Johnson, began calling the questioners white supremacists and antisemites.

Conservative commentator Michelle Malkin wrote an article for American Greatness attacking Kirk's immigration policies, particularly his stance that immigrants who graduate from U.S. universities should receive green cards. After defending Fuentes and his followers, Malkin was fired as a speaker for Young America's Foundation, a rival organization to Turning Point whose events Groypers had also targeted. Malkin later called herself a mother figure to and leader of the Groypers.

=== UCLA incident ===
Another Turning Point USA event the Groypers targeted was a promotional event for Donald Trump Jr.'s book Triggered, featuring Trump, Kirk, and Guilfoyle at the University of California, Los Angeles in November 2019. Anticipating further questions from Fuentes's followers, it was announced that the event's Q&A portion had been canceled, which led to heckling and boos from the mostly pro-Trump audience. The disruptions forced the event, originally scheduled to last two hours, to end after 30 minutes.

The Groyper Wars earned widespread media attention after the UCLA incident with Trump Jr.. Chadwick Moore of Spectator USA commented that the ordeal revealed deep divisions within the American right among young voters, particularly Generation Z. Moore claimed this divide was due to the Groypers' viewing Kirk and others in the mainstream conservative movement as "snatching the baton and appointing themselves the guardians of 2016's spoils", despite holding beliefs that Fuentes and his followers' beliefs conflict with Trump's "Make America Great Again" agenda. Another Spectator author, Ben Sixsmith, claimed that Turning Point's unwillingness to respond to controversial questions and use of insults to dismiss its critics revealed the organization's hypocrisy after having "promoted themselves as the debate guys".

=== Targeting of mainstream conservatives ===
Groypers' targets for heckling quickly expanded beyond Kirk and TPUSA to other mainstream conservative groups and individuals, which they sometimes collectively call "Conservative Inc.", including Young America's Foundation and its student outreach branch Young Americans for Freedom, which included such speakers as Ben Shapiro and Matt Walsh of The Daily Wire and Jonah Goldberg of The Dispatch. In December 2019, outside a venue where a TPUSA event was being held, Fuentes crossed paths with Shapiro, who was on his way to the event with his wife and children. Fuentes confronted him over his past public speaking comments. Shapiro refused to acknowledge him. Fuentes faced widespread condemnation from politicians and various pundits—including Nikki Haley, Meghan McCain, Sebastian Gorka, Megyn Kelly, and Michael Avenatti—for confronting Shapiro while he was with his family.

Addressing the increase in attention to the far right due to Kirk's aggressive questioning, Shapiro gave a speech at Stanford University in which he attacked Fuentes (without naming him) and his followers as essentially a rebranded version of the alt-right.

=== Groyper Leadership Conference ===
In December 2019, Fuentes held the Groyper Leadership Summit in Florida. A small group attended in person, and others joined via livestream. The event was held at the same time and in the same city as TPUSA's Student Action Summit (SAS); Groypers argued with SAS attendees outside their venue, and Fuentes, Patrick Casey, and some Groypers were removed from the SAS venue after attempting to enter. At the Groyper Leadership Summit, Fuentes, Casey, and former InfoWars contributor Jake Lloyd spoke about the Groypers' strategy and ideology.

In January 2020, Groyper and former leader of Kansas State University's TPUSA chapter Jaden McNeil formed the KSU organization America First Students. The group, which shares a name with Fuentes's America First podcast, was conceived at the Groyper Leadership Summit, and Groyper leaders have helped promote it. The America First Students organization, which says it formed "in defense of Christian values, strong families, closed borders, and the American worker", is considered to promote the Groyper movement.

In February 2020, Fuentes spoke at several events held as rival events to the Conservative Political Action Conference. One of these, hosted by the online publication National File, featured Fuentes, Alex Jones of InfoWars, and Proud Boys founder Gavin McInnes. Fuentes hosted the first annual America First Political Action Conference, which included such speakers as Patrick Casey, former Daily Caller author Scott Greer, and Malkin.

== January 6 United States Capitol attack ==
Groypers were present at the January 6 United States Capitol attack and prominent among those who participated in the early waves of attack on the Capitol. Exact numbers are not known, but several were arrested. In February 2021, the Anti-Defamation League reported that it had identified ten Groypers or related white supremacists involved in the riots. Fuentes and Casey were on the Capitol steps and celebrated the temporary disruption of Congress, but have not been charged. Both were subpoenaed by the United States House Select Committee on the January 6 Attack in January 2022 for their role in planning the attack.

=== Key figures and legal outcomes ===
- Riley Williams of Harrisburg, Pennsylvania, was accused of invading Nancy Pelosi's office and stealing her laptop and gavel and generally accelerating the attack. She was tried and found guilty of six charges, including a felony count of civil disorder. On March 23, 2023, Williams was sentenced to three years in prison with three years' probation and fined.
- Christian Secor of Costa Mesa, California, was at the Capitol, where he allegedly flew the Groyper flag. He was convicted of obstruction of an official proceeding, civil disorder, assault, and resisting arrest, and sentenced to 42 months in prison.
- Joseph Brody of Springfield, Virginia, and four others acted as a group that assisted the mob "in using a metal barricade against a U.S. Capitol Police officer, knocking the officers back as he attempted to secure the North Door". He was convicted of assaulting a police officer, resisting or impeding law enforcement officers, causing bodily injury, interfering with a law enforcement officer during a civil disorder, and obstruction of an official proceeding.
- David Dempsey of Los Angeles, California, received a 20-year sentence for attacking several law enforcement officers on January 6. This was the second-longest sentence for anyone involved in the insurrection. Before sentencing, Dempsey apologized to the police officers in the courtroom, saying he had a "profound sense of regret", but as he was led out of the room after sentencing he made a hand sign associated with the Groyper movement.
- Thomas Carey of Pittsburgh, Ohio, Gabriel Chase of Gainesville, Florida, Jon Lizak of Cold Spring Harbor, New York, and Paul Ewald Lovley of Halethorpe, Maryland, all pleaded guilty to demonstrating in a Capitol building and were each fined $500.
- Groyper influencer Anthime Gionet, known as Baked Alaska, was arrested for his role in storming the Capitol building, which he live-streamed. According to the Institute for Strategic Dialogue, "During the riot, he wore Pit Viper sunglasses, which have since been adopted as a symbol by the Groypers."
- Tristan Sartor of Ruffs Dale, Pennsylvania, was charged with criminally entering a restricted building and attempting to "impede or disrupt the orderly conduct of Government business" at the Capitol.

== Groyper War 2 ==
In August 2024, Fuentes began a "digital war" against Trump's presidential campaign, which he dubbed "Groyper War 2", referencing his followers' activities in 2019. In response to Trump's poor polling, Fuentes began calling on his followers to "bring the energy with memes, edits, replies, and trolls" aimed at pressuring Trump's campaign to adopt further-right positions on race and immigration, as well as urging Trump to fire his campaign advisors Chris LaCivita and Susie Wiles. In addition to directing his followers to make their demands trend on X and Truth Social, Fuentes threatened to "escalate pressure in the real world", urging followers to withhold their votes and protest Trump rallies in battleground states. A senior researcher for the Institute for Strategic Dialogue speculated that Fuentes's "crude" attempts at platform manipulation could be a blueprint for more sophisticated actors, such as hostile states, to engage in foreign election interference due to the lack of enforcement actions taken by X and Truth Social in response to Fuentes's brief influence campaign.

Shortly after initiating this effort, Fuentes took credit for Trump's rehiring of Corey Lewandowski as a senior campaign advisor. An anonymous source cited by The Washington Post claimed that Fuentes was making it "far more difficult for Trump" to make changes to his campaign "if it looks like he's responding to the groypers".

In September 2024, Fuentes said that he and his followers would begin a door-to-door campaign in Michigan, encouraging voters to pledge not to vote for Trump unless he aligned with the far-right on key issues. This never materialized. In a December 2025 interview, Fuentes said that in the campaign's final months, they "sort of abandoned" the effort as Trump gained in the polls, reducing the leverage they had to potentially cost him the election.

== Political activism ==
=== Disavowals and challenges ===
The Groyper movement has mostly failed to gain political traction, often being disavowed by the politicians it has attempted to support. Congressman Paul Gosar, the keynote speaker at Fuentes's AFPAC II in 2021, disavowed Fuentes and his followers the next day while addressing CPAC. At AFPAC III in 2022, several political figures Fuentes claimed were slated to speak, including Arizona gubernatorial nominee Kari Lake and former acting Director of the U.S. Immigration and Customs Enforcement Thomas Homan, did not attend and disavowed the event upon learning of Fuentes's views. The conference's keynote speaker, Congresswoman Marjorie Taylor Greene, later said she did not know who Fuentes was and, upon learning of his views, condemned him.

One of the candidates Fuentes endorsed in the 2022 midterms who later disavowed his endorsement was Joe Kent, who ran in Washington's 3rd congressional district. In response to Kent's disavowal, Fuentes began organizing an online campaign against him, and although Kent ultimately won the Republican nomination, defeating incumbent Congresswoman Jaime Herrera Beutler, he narrowly lost to Marie Gluesenkamp Perez in the general election. A few Republicans supported Perez as a result of both the questioning of Kent's past and the motives of right-wing voters and influencers such as Fuentes. Perez also gained mainstream Republican support by flipping on issues such as abortion.

=== Electoral involvement ===
Of the AFPAC III speakers who did not rescind their support for Fuentes, only two ran for major office: Lieutenant Governor of Idaho Janice McGeachin and Arizona State Senator Wendy Rogers. Rogers won a competitive primary that year and was reelected, but she was censured for her remarks at the conference calling for political violence. McGeachin, who ran for governor of Idaho that year, lost the primary to incumbent Governor Brad Little by a 20-point margin.

Fuentes and the Groyper movement later supported Laura Loomer's candidacy for Florida's 11th congressional district in 2022. On the night of the primary, Fuentes attended Loomer's election watch party, and they were filmed sharing a toast as results came in that seemed to suggest Loomer would defeat incumbent Congressman Daniel Webster; Loomer toasted "to the hostile takeover of the Republican Party". When additional results came in confirming Loomer's loss to Webster by 7 points, she claimed without evidence in a speech to her supporters that her loss was due to voter fraud.

During the 2024 presidential election, Fuentes said he would not vote for President Trump, voicing concerns over administrative staff and the campaign's stance on H1B visas.

During the 2026 election, Fuentes endorsed James Fishback for governor of Florida. Fishback appeared on the X space (audio calls) of user Greg The Groyper. Fuentes also urged Groypers to vote for democrat candidates in the election in protest of President Trump's failures on campaign promises and key right-wing issues.

=== Kanye West campaign ===
In late 2022 and early 2023, the Groyper movement shifted away from its longtime position of supporting Trump and instead began promoting Kanye West's presidential campaign. West brought Fuentes to a dinner at Mar-a-Lago with Trump, which generated significant controversy and raised Fuentes's profile; Trump later disavowed Fuentes, saying he was not initially aware of Fuentes's views. West's campaign soon included Milo Yiannopoulos, Ali Alexander, and Rumble streamer Sneako. Many Groypers, including fellow streamers on Fuentes's website Cozy.tv, began using their platforms to promote West's antisemitic views. Two Cozy streamers, Dalton Clodfelter and Tyler Russell, began streaming themselves harassing students at college campuses with a table display reading "Ye is Right—Change my Mind", a slogan that derived from a college tour by right-wing commentator Steven Crowder.

Jewish student groups and allies frequently protested these events, playing music on loudspeakers and chanting to drown out the streamers' speeches. The planned college tour was canceled after less than a month when Clodfelter lost the funding for both the tour and the Rumble channel associated with it.

On May 4, 2023, it was reported that West had fired Fuentes and Alexander, the latter of whom had become embroiled in a sexual harassment scandal involving young men and underage boys, and rehired Yiannopoulos, who had since split from Fuentes and was the first person to leak the allegations against Alexander, despite initially denying the rumors on an episode of InfoWars.
