= Jaden McNeil =

American far-right live-streamer (born 1999)

- Born: Jaden Patrick McNeil; May 17, 1999 (age 27)
- Education: Kansas State University
- Occupation: Online streamer
- Movement: Groypers (2020–2022)

Jaden Patrick McNeil (born May 17, 1999) is an American far-right activist and online streamer. Known for controversial views on society and politics, his views have been widely characterized as white nationalist, albeit promulgated as "America First" rhetoric, focusing on themes like closed borders, strong Christian values, and traditional families. McNeil has drawn significant controversy with remarks about George Floyd and Black Lives Matter.

In 2021, the Anti-Defamation League described McNeil as an "America First" Groyper. He is most notable for being the former Turning Point USA chapter president of Kansas State University. He is the founder and former president of America First Students. McNeil was formerly treasurer of the America First Foundation, a nonprofit organization which organizes AFPAC (an annual conference associated with the Groyper movement) and other political events.

He was described by the Southern Poverty Law Center (SPLC) as a "sidekick personality" of Nick Fuentes. In May 2022, he broke ties with Fuentes and the Groyper movement. During a podcast, McNeil stated that after "years as a loyal footsoldier to Fuentes," he was left with "no money, no friends, and no prospects" due to this association.

== Career ==
In January 2020, Groyper and former leader of Kansas State University's Turning Point USA chapter Jaden McNeil formed the Kansas State University organization America First Students. The group, which shares a name with Nick Fuentes' America First podcast, is part of the Groypers.

On June 25, 2020, one month after George Floyd was murdered by a police officer, McNeil posted to Twitter a tweet which purported to "congratulate" Floyd on being one-month drug free. After KSU condemned the tweet, staff and students of KSU called for McNeil to be expelled. KSU's football team also boycotted the school due to the inaction from higher ups on reprimanding McNeil. McNeil remained unapologetic and was not expelled. McNeil is no longer a student at KSU.

McNeil and Fuentes were both present during the January 6 United States Capitol attack in early 2021. Photographs and video from the event showed both men were present in the crowd outside the Capitol building, although it is unknown whether they entered. At 1:15 pm, McNeil tweeted,"They just tear gassed us at the Capital [sic]. BLM can burn, loot, and murder but we aren’t allowed to protest a stolen election." Immediately prior to the riot, McNeil had attended Donald Trump's rally alongside other white nationalist personalities. McNeil also retweeted videos that showed him outside the Capitol during the riot.

On April 30, 2022, McNeil resigned from his position as treasurer of the America First Foundation, and has since feuded with Fuentes and the Groypers. In an interview on a podcast called Kino Casino on May 6, McNeil claimed that his role as treasurer was in name only, with Fuentes in control of the organization's finances. The group's finances had been severely affected by Fuentes' and McNeil's involvement with the rallies leading up to the Capitol attack, and at the time of McNeil's resignation, Fuentes was under federal investigation. In the same interview, McNeil and another former employee of the America First Foundation, Simon Dickerman, made numerous other claims about Fuentes, accusing Fuentes of having "brainwashed" his followers, faking his Catholicism, working as an informant for the FBI, and being a closeted homosexual. Since splitting with Fuentes, McNeil has retained his far-right views, and broadcasts livestreams covering news, internecine right-wing conflict, and his former political organizations.
