= Baked Alaska (influencer) =

American alt-right personality

- Born: Anthime Joseph Gionet; 1987 or 1988 (age 38–39); Anchorage, Alaska, U.S.
- Other names: Tim Gionet; Tim Treadstone; Yoba
- Education: Azusa Pacific University (BS)
- Occupations: Influencer; Livestreamer
- Known for: Alt-right personality

Anthime Joseph "Tim" Gionet (born 1987 or 1988), more commonly known as Baked Alaska, is an American far-right influencer who gained notoriety through his advocacy on behalf of alt-right and white supremacist ideology. He has also used the aliases Tim Treadstone and Yoba.

Prior to his 2016 transformation into an alt-right activist, Gionet was initially a rapper and Internet prankster. He later worked as a commentator for BuzzFeed, where he supported libertarian and progressive political positions and marched in support of Black Lives Matter. In 2016, Gionet turned to the politics of Donald Trump and the alt-right in what he described as a rejection of "political correctness". By 2017, Gionet's political views had radicalized; that year, he began to use his social media platform and Internet activism to promote racist and antisemitic ideologies, which included sharing neo-Nazi content on social media. He also played a role in the 2017 white supremacist Unite the Right rally in Charlottesville, Virginia.

At the beginning of 2019, Gionet claimed to have changed his views and released videos in which he denounced the alt-right and meme culture as sources of terrorism and violence. As part of an attempt to rebrand himself, he gave a series of interviews condemning the alt-right and expressed plans to establish a non-profit organization in order to teach anti-racism to white supremacists. In November 2019, Gionet reverted to his earlier politics, professing far-right ideology and collaborating with the white nationalist Groyper movement. He then began to earn notoriety for his livestreams, in which he would antagonize or harass bystanders, resulting in an assault charge in December 2020.

Originally known as an extremely online personality, Baked Alaska was gradually banned from most mainstream social media platforms. In January 2021, Gionet livestreamed the U.S. Capitol building breach by a pro-Trump mob, which was found to be a violation of his release. It was later reported that Gionet's footage was used by the Federal Bureau of Investigation (FBI) to identify other trespassers. Gionet was later arrested by federal agents that month in connection with his activities at the Capitol. He was released pending trial and continued livestreaming while facing federal charges. On January 10, 2023, Gionet was sentenced to 60 days in jail. Gionet was pardoned by Donald Trump on January 20, 2025.

== Early life ==
Gionet was born in Anchorage, Alaska, to a family of eight. His father is a pharmacist and his mother is a nurse. Both his parents are devout Christians who operate a non-profit organization aimed at promoting Christianity and providing medical supplies to orphanages in eastern Russia. During his formative years, Gionet was actively involved in his parents' charity and went to Russia with them numerous times. Five of his siblings were adopted from Russia. As an adolescent, Gionet spent a year and a half in the Russian city of Petropavlovsk-Kamchatsky. He later said that part of his "chaotic nature" may have stemmed from this experience.

In 2006, Gionet left Alaska for Los Angeles and attended Azusa Pacific University, where he graduated with a Bachelor of Science in marketing.

== Early career ==
While working at Warner Records, Gionet was a social media and marketing intern for Warped Tour. Kevin Lyman gave him the nickname "Alaska" in reference to where he grew up. In order to make it more "unique", Gionet changed the nickname to "Baked Alaska", a reference to him being a marijuana user and a play on the dessert of the same name.

=== Rap and Internet pranks ===
In 2011, Gionet worked for Capitol Records for a short time, before pursuing his own career in rap music with a "wild, redneck, kick-ass" persona. He kept his nickname Baked Alaska as a stage name. His rap songs used a satirical tone and traded on his Alaskan roots, with titles like "I Live on Glaciers" or "I Climb Mountains". In 2013, the Anchorage Daily News published a profile of Baked Alaska, describing him as a "comedy/music video artist".

Gionet also posted many humorous videos on Vine where he became known as a prankster, achieving some online popularity. A video of him pouring a gallon of milk on his face attracted several millions of views. In 2013, he called himself a "cross between Weird Al, Lonely Island, Borat and Jackass".

Gionet attempted to promote his rap career by producing several professionally-made videos, which failed to become viral. While in Los Angeles, he was also involved in the party scene and had issues with drugs and alcohol, leading him to seek professional help to get sober. Unhappy with his life in Los Angeles and the lack of progress of his musical career, Gionet was about to return to Alaska when his social media skills and popularity on Vine led him to be hired by BuzzFeed.

=== Employment with BuzzFeed ===
From 2015 to 2016, Gionet worked for BuzzFeed as a social media strategist, and later commentator. He first managed BuzzFeed's Vine account, then took over one of its Twitter accounts. As he had done during his rap career, Gionet was protective of his real name while he worked at BuzzFeed; most of his colleagues knew him only as "Alaska" and some of his employers believed his family name was "Treadstone", after another of his aliases.

Gionet first identified politically as a libertarian, supporting Rand Paul's 2016 presidential campaign and the legalization of marijuana, and participating in Black Lives Matter street demonstrations. For a time, he kept a Bernie Sanders poster at his desk, but later started wearing MAGA hats around the office. Gionet says he left BuzzFeed and turned to the politics of Donald Trump and the alt-right in rejection of "political correctness". He commented in 2017 that "BuzzFeed turned [him] into a monster".

== Politics ==
=== Alt-right figure ===
After leaving BuzzFeed in 2016, Gionet traveled as Milo Yiannopoulos' Dangerous Faggot Tour manager. He later stopped working for Yiannopoulos, who reportedly found his views too extreme.

In May 2016, Gionet was introduced to then-candidate Donald Trump, and Trump signed Gionet's arm next to where he had Trump's face tattooed. Later that month, Gionet released the song "MAGA Anthem", which featured pro-Trump lyrics and amassed more than 100,000 views on YouTube. Mike Cernovich then hired Gionet to work on a project dedicated to gathering Trump supporters. Following the 2016 presidential election, Gionet continued his pro-Trump activism, delivering speeches and participating in multiple rallies.

Gionet was also known for spearheading the #DumpKelloggs and #TrumpCup hashtag campaigns. #TrumpCup was a Twitter trend in November 2016; following allegations that a Starbucks employee refused to write "Trump" on a cup, Gionet began a campaign instructing patrons to claim their name was "Trump", forcing baristas to write it. The hashtag trended with more than 27,000 tweets in the span of two days. #DumpKelloggs was an attempted boycott in response to Kellogg pulling ads from Breitbart.

In late 2016, conflict arose between Cernovich and Gionet when Gionet made antisemitic remarks on Twitter, claiming the media was "run in majority by Jewish people". Gionet was disinvited from DeploraBall, an unofficial inaugural ball for the alt-right. Gionet later mended his relationship with Cernovich, saying that he had been "heated" when he made those posts, and that he had misspoken.

In February 2017, Gionet called for a boycott of Netflix in response to the announcement of Dear White People. He claimed that the show was "anti-white" and promoted "white genocide". In July 2017, Gionet self-published through Amazon the book Meme Magic Secrets Revealed; it was removed as a copyright violation due to its use of Pepe the Frog on the cover. Also that year, Gionet participated in an alt-right rally outside the Lincoln Memorial in Washington, D.C., and later addressed participants at the white nationalist Unite the Right rally in Charlottesville, Virginia, on August 11, 2017. At the Unite the Right rally, he marched and chanted, "You will not replace us", "White Lives Matter", and "I'm proud to be white". Gionet was maced by unknown assailants during the rally; a video which showed him pouring milk on his face to try to neutralize the chemical went viral in September 2017.

On social media, Gionet has frequently promoted the Fourteen Words, a white supremacist slogan. He has also hosted an online talk show in which he interviewed far-right personalities such as neo-Nazi Richard B. Spencer. He was permanently banned from Twitter after posting a photoshopped image of Laura Loomer, a Jewish far-right activist, inside a gas chamber. In December 2022, Gionet had his original Twitter account reinstated.

=== Vacillating ideological affiliations ===
Since 2016, Gionet has frequently changed his political ideology, and has on various occasions oscillated between far-right ideology and anti-racist progressivism. After years of promoting white nationalist and alt-right politics, in March 2019, Gionet attempted to rebrand himself as a reformed ex-racist, who had come to recognize that the alt-right and meme culture were hateful and led to terrorism and violence. He released an emotional video apologizing for his past participation in meme culture, and stated: "I was brainwashed, I felt like I was part of a cult". Gionet also alleged a link between meme culture and the Christchurch mosque shootings, and warned of conservatives becoming radicalized to the far-right. In the course of his attempted rebranding, Gionet claimed in an interview with The Daily Beast that he was never serious about far-right politics, and thought that the alt-right "was just fun memes and jokes and edgy 4chan posting" until he "got to the end of this rabbit hole and realized these guys are serious". Gionet purportedly abandoned his support for President Trump, and began promoting 2020 Democratic presidential candidate Andrew Yang, such as in his rap music video "Yang Gang Anthem".

Without finding success in this rebranding, Gionet relocated to Phoenix, Arizona, by July 2019. He livestreamed at a left-wing protest, alternately pretending to be a reporter and protester, antagonizing journalists, and provoking protesters on camera.

In November 2019, Gionet officially reverted his politics. He deleted his apology videos, and began collaborating with the white nationalist Groyper movement in its "trolling" of Turning Point USA rallies.

== Livestreaming ==
From 2019, Gionet became known for his livestreams in which he often filmed himself variously annoying, harassing, insulting and sometimes pepper spraying bystanders at the whims of his audience.

During 2020, in the midst of the COVID-19 pandemic, Gionet would film himself trespassing on privately owned establishments that require the wearing of face coverings, while refusing to wear one. He would mock and insult employees of these establishments for wearing masks, and refuse to leave when told to do so. He eventually posted on social media that he had contracted COVID-19.

As he livestreamed, Gionet received donations from his audience. He was reportedly paid tens of thousands of dollars by Internet viewers who found his conduct amusing, or agreed with the political messages. In October 2020, he was banned from YouTube for his repeated illegal behavior. Later on, he used the streaming service IP2Always.Win, which is known for hosting similar videos.

=== Participation in the 2021 Capitol attack ===
On January 6, 2021, Gionet participated in the attack on the U.S. Capitol in support of then-President Trump. Due to bans from other platforms, Gionet used the service DLive to livestream his actions outside and inside the building. About 16,000 people watched his Capitol livestream. DLive later suspended several accounts, removed broadcasts, and suspended earnings of those who participated in the Capitol riot, including Gionet's. Gionet was also banned from TikTok following these events. On January 13, it was reported that Gionet's livestream was being used by the FBI to identify and track down suspects who had broken into the Capitol building, some of whom Gionet had interviewed.

== Legal issues ==
Gionet was arrested in multiple livestreamed instances of trespassing and assault, including pepper spraying a bouncer, in Scottsdale, Arizona, in December 2020. Following this particular incident, Gionet was found guilty of assault, disorderly conduct, and criminal trespass, all misdemeanors. On January 13, 2022, Gionet was sentenced to 30 days in jail.

On January 14, 2021, Gionet failed to appear at a court hearing in Scottsdale in which prosecutors aimed to revoke his pre-trial release that had been granted after his December 2020 arrest related to the incident with the bouncer. Prosecutors argued that Gionet had violated his bail conditions multiple times in relation to the 2021 Capitol attack: by leaving the state of Arizona, by knowingly entering and remaining on the Capitol grounds without lawful authority, and by violently entering and disorderly conduct on Capitol grounds. An Arizona judge issued a warrant for Gionet's arrest due to breach of bail conditions. He was apprehended by the FBI in Houston, Texas, on January 15, 2021.

On November 3, 2021, Maricopa County prosecutors charged Gionet with misdemeanor criminal damage and attempted criminal damage over an incident in which Gionet allegedly defaced a Hanukkah display. The charges relate to a livestream from December 19, 2020, during which Gionet recorded himself tearing a "Happy Hanukkah" sign from a menorah in front of the Arizona State Capitol, saying "No more 'Happy Hanukkah', only 'Merry Christmas'".

In July 2022, Gionet pleaded guilty to parading, demonstrating or picketing inside a Capitol building, a misdemeanor. In January 2023, he was sentenced to 60 days in jail. The randomly-assigned judge in the case, District Judge Trevor McFadden, said his actions prior to sentencing showed his lack of remorse. In December 2022, Gionet tweeted "i can't believe i'm going to jail for an nft salesman," referencing Donald Trump.

On January 20, 2025, after beginning his second term in office, President Trump issued pardons to roughly 1,500 other individuals charged with crimes connected to January 6, including Gionet. Gionet celebrated the pardon on X (formerly Twitter), writing: "Thank you to everyone who has always supported me over the years. It's a bit emotional for me knowing 1,500 patriots were just freed. My probation is terminated. God is so good."

== Book ==
- Meme Magic Secrets Revealed (Infinite Manifest Press, 2017; re-released in 2018 as Meme Magic Secrets Redacted after a copyright dispute regarding the use of Pepe the Frog on the cover)

== See also ==
- List of cases of the January 6 United States Capitol attack (G-L)
- Criminal proceedings in the January 6 United States Capitol attack
- List of people granted executive clemency in the second Trump presidency
