= Counterparty (platform) =

Cryptocurrency platform

- Counterparty logo
- Original authors: Adam Krellenstein, Evan Wagner, Robby Dermody
- Developers: Adam Krellenstein, Ouziel Slama
- Release: January 2014
- Stable release: 11.0.4 (January 2026)
- Written in: Python, Rust
- Operating system: Cross-platform
- License: MIT
- Website: www.counterparty.io
- Repository: github.com/CounterpartyXCP/counterparty-core

Counterparty is a DeFi platform and Internet protocol built on top of the Bitcoin blockchain. It was one of the best-known "Bitcoin 2.0" (later known as non-fungible token) platforms in 2014.

== History ==
In July 2014, Counterparty was part of a plan by Overstock.com to issue and trade legal securities on a blockchain. The initiative, originally named "Medici", eventually became Overstock's tZERO.

In November 2014, Counterparty added support for the Ethereum Virtual Machine (EVM) to the Counterparty protocol, allowing all Ethereum decentralized applications to be run on the Bitcoin blockchain within the Counterparty protocol.

In early 2024, after a hiatus in development, some core developers returned to fix long-standing issues with stability, correctness and performance of the Counterparty reference implementation, and to prepare for future feature development.

== Technology ==
Counterparty's native cryptocurrency, XCP, was created during January 2014 by 'proof of burn', which was purported to be an alternative to a crowdsale or 'initial coin offering' (ICO). The initial creation of XCP through this process involved sending about 2140 BTC, worth between US $1.6 million and US $2 million at the time, to a provably unspendable Bitcoin address.

From its launch in 2014, the open-source Counterwallet (Web) was the primary Counterparty wallet, maintained by the Counterparty team themselves until July 2024 when it was officially discontinued.

The original Counterparty explorer, Blockscan, was created by Matthew Tan in early 2014. In 2017, Blockscan.com shut down and relaunched as the Ethereum-based explorer Etherscan.
