= Pepe the Frog =

Comic character and Internet meme

Pepe
- Pepe the Frog in his original format

Publication information
- First appearance: Boy's Club (2005)
- Created by: Matt Furie

Pepe the Frog (/ˈpɛpeɪ/ PEP-ay) is a comic character and Internet meme created by cartoonist Matt Furie. Designed as a green anthropomorphic frog with a humanoid body usually wearing a blue t-shirt, Pepe originated in Furie's 2005 webcomic Boy's Club. The character became an Internet meme when his popularity steadily grew across websites such as Myspace, Gaia Online, and 4chan from 2008 onwards; by 2015, he had become one of the most popular memes on 4chan and Tumblr.

Different types of Pepe memes include "Sad Frog", "Smug Frog", "Angry Pepe", "Feels Frog", and "You will never..." Frog; the most popular sentences associated to him are "Feels Good Man" (a quote from his original Boy's Club appearance, which became the character's catchphrase) and its opposite, "Feels Bad Man", meant to respectively express joy and sadness. Since 2014, "Rare Pepes" have been posted on the "meme market" as if they were trading cards.

Although originally an apolitical character in Furie's works and its original internet popularity, Pepe was appropriated from 2015 onward as a symbol of the alt-right white nationalist movement. The Anti-Defamation League (ADL) included Pepe in its hate symbol database in 2016, but said most instances of Pepe were not used in a hate-related context. Since then, Furie has expressed his dismay at Pepe being used as a hate symbol and has sued organizations for doing so; the history of Pepe and Furie's attempt to dissociate the character from the alt-right were covered in the 2020 documentary film Feels Good Man. In 2019, Pepe was used by protesters in the 2019–2020 Hong Kong protests; conversely to its western political use, Pepe the Frog's symbolism in Hong Kong is not perceived as being connected with alt-right ideology, and was welcomed by Furie.

== Origin: Boy's Club ==
"My Pepe philosophy is simple: 'Feels good man.' It is based on the meaning of the word Pepe: 'To go Pepe'. I find complete joy in physically, emotionally, and spiritually serving Pepe and his friends through comics. Each comic is sacred, and the compassion of my readers transcends any differences, the pain, and fear of 'feeling good'."

— Matt Furie, 2015 interview with The Daily Dot

Pepe the Frog was created by American artist and cartoonist Matt Furie in 2005. Its usage as an Internet meme came from his comic Boy's Club #1. The progenitor of Boy's Club was a zine Furie made on Microsoft Paint called Playtime, which included Pepe as a character. He posted his comic in a series of blog posts on Myspace in 2005.

In the comic, Pepe is seen urinating in a toilet, having left the door open; when one of his friends asks him why he lowered his pants to urinate, Pepe simply answers: "feels good man" as his rationale. Furie took those posts down when the printed edition was published in 2006.

== As an internet meme ==
Pepe was used in blog posts on Myspace in 2005 and became an in-joke on Gaia Online. In 2008, the page containing Pepe and the catchphrase was scanned and uploaded to 4chan's /b/ board, which has been described as the meme's "permanent home".

The meme took off among 4chan users, who adapted Pepe's face and catchphrase to fit different scenarios and emotions, such as melancholy, anger, and surprise. "Feels bad, man", a sad variant of the frog's "feels good, man" catchphrase, also became associated with Pepe. Color was also added; originally a black-and-white line drawing, Pepe became green with brown lips, sometimes in a blue shirt. "Feels Guy", or "Wojak", originally an unrelated character typically used to express melancholy, was eventually often paired with Pepe in user-made comics or images.

The "sad frog" variation entered usage on Tumblr by 2012. That same year, the "Smug Pepe" variant emerged. Versions of the meme appeared on Chinese social media, such as Baidu Tieba, as early as 2014. There, it has been known as shangxin qingwa (傷心青蛙), or "sad frog". In 2014, images of Pepe were shared on social media by celebrities such as Katy Perry and Nicki Minaj. As Pepe became more widespread, 4chan users began referring to particularly creative and unique variants of the meme as "rare Pepes". These images, sometimes as physical paintings, were sold on eBay and posted on Craigslist. 4chan users referred to those who used the meme outside the website as "normies" (or "normalfags"). Users from 4chan, Reddit, and elsewhere attempted to prevent mainstream usage of the meme by "making Pepe as shocking as possible".

In 2015, Pepe was #6 on Daily News and Analysis's list of the most important memes and the most retweeted meme on Twitter. The Daily Intelligencer called it Tumblr's "Biggest Meme of 2015". According to Inverse, it was one of the most-reblogged memes on Tumblr in 2015.

== Use by the alt-right ==
As early as 2015, a number of Pepe variants were created by Internet trolls to associate the character with the alt-right movement. Some of the variants produced by this had Nazi Germany, Ku Klux Klan, or white power skinhead themes.

During the 2016 United States presidential election, the meme was connected to Donald Trump's campaign. In October 2015, Trump retweeted a Pepe representation of himself, associated with a video called "You Can't Stump the Trump (Volume 4)". Later in the election, Roger Stone and Donald Trump Jr. posted a parody movie poster of The Expendables on Twitter and Instagram titled "The Deplorables", a play on Hillary Clinton's controversial phrase "basket of deplorables", which included Pepe's face among those of members of the Trump family and other figures popular among the alt-right.

Also during the election, various news organizations reported associations of the character with white nationalism and the alt-right. In May 2016, Olivia Nuzzi of The Daily Beast wrote that there was "an actual campaign to reclaim Pepe from normies" and that "turning Pepe into a white nationalist icon" was an explicit goal of some on the alt-right. In August 2016, Clinton denounced the alt-right in a speech. During the speech, a 4chan user who was liveblogging the event on the site audibly shouted "Pepe!" at the request of another user. In September 2016, an article published on Hillary Clinton's campaign website described Pepe as "a symbol associated with white supremacy" and denounced Trump's campaign for its supposed promotion of the meme. In 2020, social scientist Joan Donovan said of the Clinton campaign's decision to describe Pepe as an alt-right symbol, "If it weren't for Hillary Clinton's campaign in 2016 trying to [...] name Pepe as a signifier of the Alt-Right, that kind of recognition probably wouldn't have taken hold [...] In doing so, they showed how much of a newbie they were at what it essentially meant to be online, which in turn created a wave of media attention on which the Alt-Right was ready to coast."

In an interview with Esquire, Furie said of Pepe's usage as a hate symbol, "It sucks, but I can't control it more than anyone can control frogs on the Internet". Fantagraphics Books, Furie's publisher, issued a statement condemning the "illegal and repulsive appropriations of the character". The Anti-Defamation League, an American organization opposed to antisemitism, included Pepe in its hate symbol database but wrote that most instances of Pepe were not used in a hate-related context. Writing in Time on October 13, 2016, Furie said that "I understand that it's out of my control, but in the end, Pepe is whatever you say he is, and I, the creator, say that Pepe is love." The next day, the ADL announced that it had partnered with Furie to launch the #SavePepe (or "Save Pepe") campaign, an attempt to associate the symbol with positivity. As part of that campaign, Furie collected hundreds of "positive or peaceful" versions of Pepe to store in an online "Peace Pepe Database of Love". On October 17, 2016, Furie published a satirical take of Pepe's appropriation by the alt-right movement on The Nib. This was his first comic for the character since he ended Boy's Club in 2012.

In January 2017, in a response to "pundits" calling on Theresa May to disrupt Trump's relationship with Russia, the Russian Embassy in the United Kingdom tweeted an image of Pepe. White supremacist Richard B. Spencer, during a street interview after Trump's inauguration, was preparing to explain the meaning of a Pepe pin on his jacket when he was punched in the face, with the resulting video itself becoming the source of many memes.

On May 6, 2017, on Free Comic Book Day, it was announced that Furie had killed Pepe off in response to the character's continued use as a hate symbol. However, in an interview with Carol Off on her show As It Happens Furie said that despite news of Pepe's death, he will eventually return: "The end is a chance for a new beginning ... I got some plans for Pepe that I can't really discuss, but he's going to rise from the ashes like a phoenix ... in a puff of marijuana smoke." Soon thereafter, Furie announced his intention to "resurrect" Pepe, launching a crowdfunding campaign for a new comic book featuring Pepe. In a July 2017 interview with The Outline, Furie spoke about the comic in which he "killed" Pepe the Frog. He said, "This comic was just kind of my own kind of art therapy and dealing with the fact that Trump got elected and the new twist on Pepe that ensued. I decided to lay him to rest. But really it was just a joke, and a way for me to deal with the weirdness that was happening."

In June 2017, a proposed app and Flappy Bird clone called "Pepe Scream" was rejected from the Apple App Store due to its depiction of Pepe the Frog. The app's developer, under the name "MrSnrhms", posted a screenshot of his rejection letter on r/The Donald. The app is available on the Google Play Store.

A children's book appropriating the Pepe character, The Adventures of Pepe and Pede, advanced "racist, Islamophobic and hate-filled themes", according to a federal lawsuit Furie filed. The suit was settled out of court in August 2017, with terms including the withdrawal of the book from publication and the profits being donated to the nonprofit Council on American-Islamic Relations. Initially self-published, the book was subsequently published by Post Hill Press. The book's author, a vice-principal with the Denton Independent School District, was reassigned after the publicity.

Until September 2018, Social media service Gab used a Pepe-like illustration of a frog (named "Gabby") as its logo. The site is popular with the alt-right.

In 2018, Furie succeeded in having images of Pepe removed from The Daily Stormer website.

In January 2019, the video game Jesus Strikes Back: Judgment Day was released, which allows players to play as Pepe the Frog, among other figures, and murder various target groups including feminists, minorities, and liberals.

In June 2019, Furie received a $15,000 out of court settlement in a copyright infringement case against Infowars and Alex Jones concerning unlicensed use of the image of Pepe the Frog on far-right themed posters. Furie stated that he would continue to "enforce his copyrights aggressively to make sure nobody else is profiting off associating Pepe the Frog with hateful imagery."

=== Kek ===
"Kek", from "kekeke"/"ㅋㅋㅋ", a Korean-language onomatopoeia of laughter used similarly to "LOL", is the Korean equivalent of the English "haha". Since this is often used in StarCraft matches, Blizzard, StarCraft's developers, decided to reference it in World of Warcraft (2004): when a player of the Horde faction types "lol" using the /say messaging command, members of the opposing faction see it as "kek". A common misconception is that "kek" originated as a variation of "lel", itself a variation of "lol".

During the 2016 United States presidential election, Kek became associated with alt-right politics. Kek is associated with the occurrence of repeating digits, known as "dubs", "trips", "quads", among other terms, in the sequential codes assigned to posts made on 4chan, as if he had the ability to influence reality through Internet memes.

Online message boards such as 4chan first noted a similarity between Kek and Pepe. The phrase is widely used and 4chan users see Kek as the "'god' of memes". The phrase then became associated with the Egyptian deity Kek.

"Esoteric Kekism" references the "Esoteric Hitlerism" of writer Savitri Devi. Esoteric Kekism, also called "the Cult of Kek", is a parody religion worshipping Pepe the Frog, which sprang from the similarity of the slang term for laughter, "kek", and the name of the ancient Egyptian frog god of darkness, Kek. This deity, in turn, was associated with Pepe the Frog on internet forums. The Internet meme has its origin on the internet message forum 4chan and other chans, and the board /pol/ in particular. Kek references are closely associated with Trump and the alt-right, and the Kek-Flag was spotted at the 2021 storming of the Capitol. In January 2025, Elon Musk briefly changed his username on X to Kekius Maximus, with a profile image of Pepe in Roman military dress, and sent up the value of the memecoin.

=== Kekistan ===
Flag of "Kekistan" (top) and the war flag of the Nazi-era German armed forces

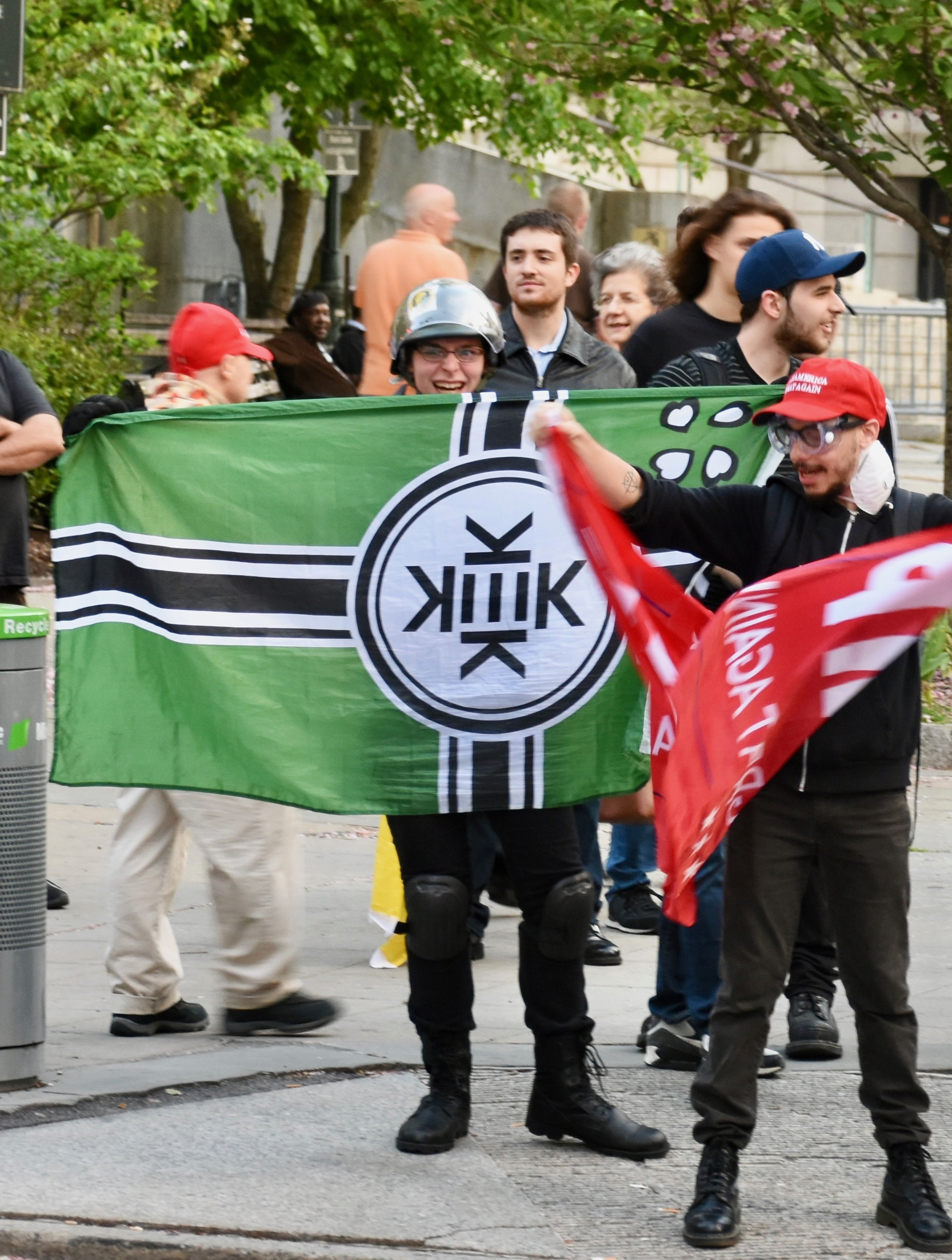
Demonstrator holding a flag of Kekistan in 2017

Kekistan is a fictional country created by 4chan users that has become a political meme and online movement. The name is derived from "kek" and the suffix "-stan", a common Central Asian country suffix. Since late 2016, the satirical ethnicity of Kekistani has been used by U.S.-based alt-right protesters opposed to what they view as political correctness. These "Kekistanis" decry the supposed "oppression" of their people and troll counterprotesters by waving the "national flag of Kekistan" (modeled after the Nazi war flag, with the red replaced by green, the Iron Cross replaced by the logo for 4chan, and the swastika replaced by a rubric for KEK).

The Kekistani flag was prominently displayed at the 2017 Berkeley protests in mid-April, and the Unite the Right rally in August 2017, and was carried by supporters of Donald Trump during the January 6 United States Capitol attack. Self-identified Kekistanis have created a fictional history around the meme, including the invasion and overthrow of other fictional countries such as "Normistan" and "Cuckistan". Kekistanis have also adopted Internet personality Gordon Hurd (in his "Big Man Tyrone" persona) as their president and the 1986 Italo disco record "Shadilay" as a national anthem. The record gained attention from the group in September 2016 because of the name of the group (P.E.P.E.) and art on the record depicting a frog holding a magic wand.

=== Groyper ===
A variation of Pepe known as "Groyper" or "Easter Toad" was used as early as 2015, and became popular in 2017. Groyper is depicted as a rotund green, frog-like creature with its chin resting on interlocked fingers. There is some disagreement around the specifics of Groyper: it has been described as a depiction of the Pepe character, a different character from Pepe but of the same species, or a toad. The Groyper meme is the namesake for Groypers, a loose group of white nationalist activists and followers of Nick Fuentes.

== Use in Hong Kong protests ==
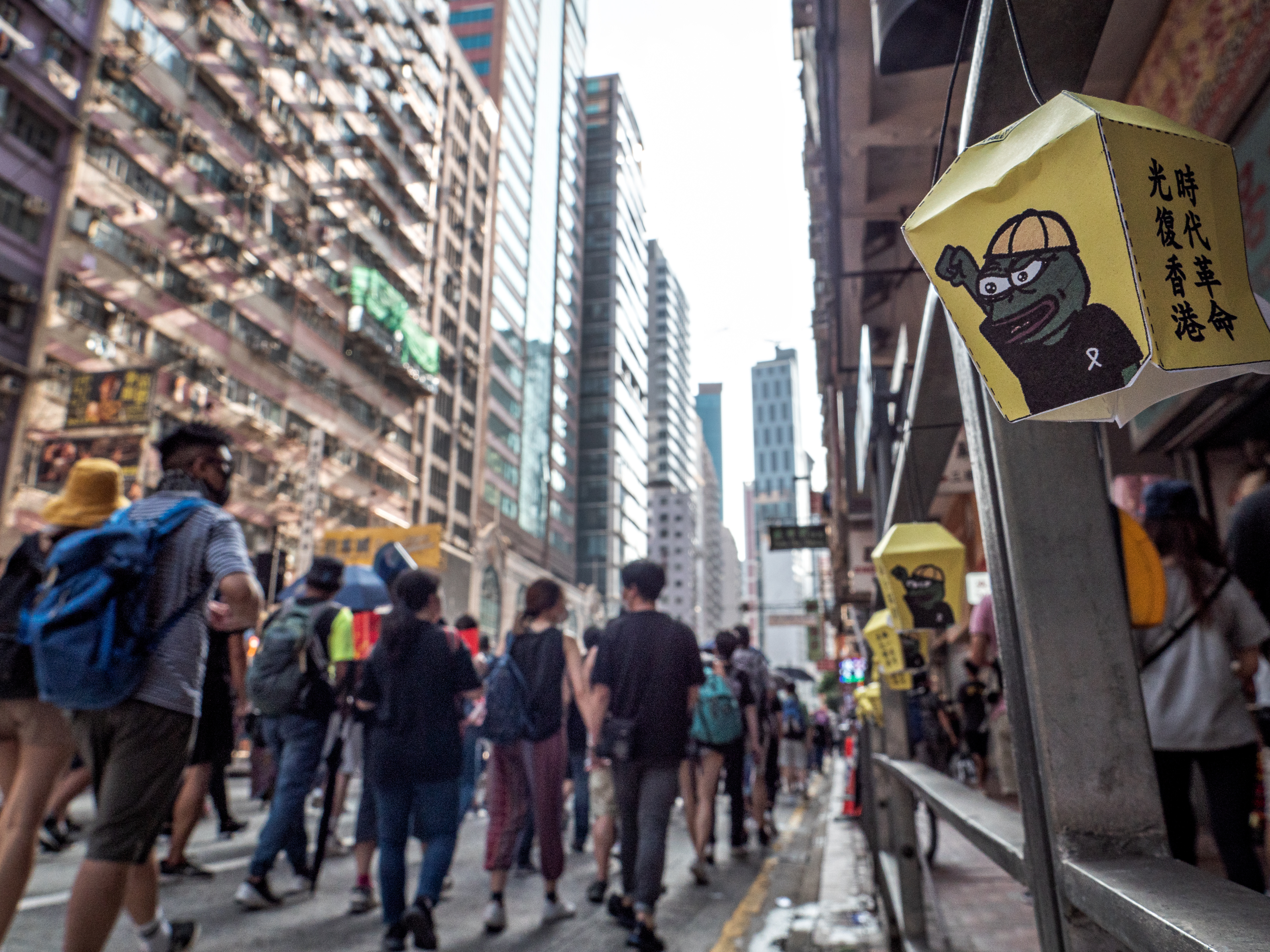
Pepe imagery displayed in the streets of Hong Kong during the 2019 protests

In August 2019, it was reported that various demonstrators at the 2019–2020 Hong Kong protests were using Pepe as a "resistance symbol".

Hong Kong protestors began to use depictions of Pepe the Frog as a symbol of liberty and resistance against the extradition bill and police brutality in the 2019–2020 Hong Kong protests. New images of Pepe the Frog surfaced showing Pepe with an injured eye after a young female first aider had her eye injured by a projectile fired by police; the incident spurred a new protest campaign called "An eye for an eye". A sign with Pepe with an injured eye held by a young nurse with one eye covered gained international media attention. Furie responded in an email with a protester, stating "This is great news! Pepe for the people!".

In the Hong Kong context, Pepe the Frog is not perceived as being connected with far-right ideology. Hong Kongers were also generally unaware that Pepe the Frog had been appropriated by the alt-right and white supremacists in the United States.

== Rare Pepe ==
A rare Pepe or RarePepe is a variation on Pepe the Frog. The related Rare Pepe crypto project, created by various artists worldwide between 2016 and 2018, was based on the meme and traded as non-fungible tokens (NFTs) recorded on the CounterParty platform. A total of 1,774 official cards were released for the project across 36 series.

=== History ===
In 2015, a subset of Pepe memes began to be referred to as "rare Pepes", with watermarks such as "RARE PEPE DO NOT SAVE", generally meaning that the artist had not previously posted the meme publicly. In April 2015, a collection of rare Pepe image files was listed on eBay, where it reached a price of $99,166 before being removed from the site.

In September 2016, the first rare Pepes were mined as "on-chain collectible assets" on Bitcoin, pre-dating Ethereum-based NFTs. A Telegram chat group dedicated to discussing the Counterparty NFT was created shortly after. By 2017, a community had grown around the digital collectables, spurring developers to build platforms for the purpose of cataloging and exchanging these images, thereby creating the first crypto art market in 2016.

On January 13, 2018, a live auction of rare Pepes took place in New York City, including one based on Homer Simpson which sold for $38,500, watched by representatives of the Metropolitan Museum of Art, Museum of Modern Art, and Sotheby's Institute of Art in the audience. The buyer sold it three years later for $312,000.

On October 26, 2021, a rare Pepe, PEPENOPOULOS, sold at a Sotheby's auction for $3.6m USD. This was one of the most expensive sale prices for non-fungible tokens. Among other icons, it was featured on a Fortune magazine cover dedicated to a special report about cryptocurrency.

In March 2022, a buyer who spent $537,084 on a rare Pepe filed a lawsuit claiming fraudulent misrepresentation, alleging that only one copy was to be sold whereas 46 copies were subsequently given away, devaluing his investment.

=== Trading platforms ===
Two components, created simultaneously, both support each other to enable interaction and asset exchange among both contributors and market participants:

- "Rare Pepe Wallet" is a web-based, encrypted wallet developed to allow users to buy, sell, and store rare Pepes using a medium of exchange called PepeCash. The backbone of the Rare Pepe Wallet is the Counterparty platform, which is built upon the Bitcoin protocol.
- "Rare Pepe Directory" was a directory built to catalog all known rare Pepes, with specific guidelines for submitting the images for inclusion. The Rare Pepe Foundation removed any offensive images that were submitted before they became visible.

Crypto artists used these resources to publish their work as digital tokens with a fixed circulation and then issued the art to collectors who then sold, traded, or stored their collections.

Collectors use the "Rare Pepe Blockchain Trading" channel on the Telegram instant messaging platform to discuss with other collectors.

== Documentary ==
A 2020 documentary, Feels Good Man, relates the story of Pepe's origins and co-option by the alt-right, and Furie's attempts to regain control over his creation.

== See also ==
- Frogs in culture
- Frogtwitter, alt-right community on X
- Happy Merchant, an antisemitic caricature sometimes combined with Pepe the Frog
- List of aquatic humanoids
- "Moon Man", a white supremacist appropriation of McDonald's advertising mascot "Mac Tonight"
- Racism on the Internet
