= Dillon Irizarry =

American far-right activist

Dillon Hopper
- Born: Dillon Irizarry; 1988 (age 37–38); Roswell, New Mexico
- Occupation: activist
- Years active: 2016-present
- Known for: Leader of Vanguard America; Coordinator of the Unite the Right rally

Dillon Irizarry (also known as Dillon Hopper) is an American far-right activist known for founding and leading the alt-right and white supremacist group Vanguard America and being one of the principle coordinators of the Unite the Right rally.

== Biography ==
=== Early life ===
Irizarry was born in 1988 in New Mexico and is of Spanish ancestry. He graduated from high-school in Roswell, New Mexico in 2005 and then immediately enlisted in the United States Marine Corps. He joined the marines at the insistence of a Big Brothers Big Sisters of America mentor.

Irizarry served in the War in Afghanistan as an information security technician. He was deployed during Operation Iraqi Freedom in 2008, and Operation Enduring Freedom in 2010. He rose to the rank of staff sergeant and remained in active duty until 2017.

In 2006 he legally changed his name to Dillon Hopper, although he still uses Irizarry when speaking on behalf of Vanguard America.

Irizarry claims to have been a neo-fascist since 2012, the same year he started work as a recruiter for the marines. Irizarry has been openly involved in American far-right circles since at least 2016 when he gave a speech at a neo-Nazi gathering in Pikeville, Kentucky. This is despite the Marines policy prohibiting activity duty personnel from joining groups that "espouse supremacist causes."

=== Vanguard America leadership ===
At the Kentucky speech he announced that he was the leader of a yet unheard of group, Vanguard America, which consisted of 200 members across 20 states. Irizarry would later state that Vanguard America was founded in 2015 in California. Irizarry also claimed that he was not the founder of Vanguard America, and that he took over leadership. Irizarry structured Vanguard America as a hierarchical organization based on Führerprinzip, referring to himself as 'commander.'

In June 2017 Irizarry started to feud with Thomas Rousseau, the leader of the "Southern Front" of Vanguard America. A key moment came during a "Texas is Ours" rally in Austin, during which Rousseau gave a lengthy speech and sidelined Irizarry. Irizarry claimed that Rousseau was attempting to portray himself as the leader of Vanguard America.

=== Unite the Right ===
Despite not participating in the Unite the Right rally himself, Irizarry was one of the event's key coordinators. The rally started as a plan between Irizarry and Matthew Heimbach of the Traditionalist Worker Party to bring together all the far-right groups in the country. The rally's leadership consisted of Irizarry, Heimbach, Jeff Schoep of the National Socialist Movement, and Michael Hill of the League of the South with Richard B. Spencer and Nathan Damigo of Identity Evropa being brought in later. Irizarry himself would not attend the rally due to the death of his mother shortly beforehand. Instead Rousseau would lead the Vanguard America group at the rally.

The rally would be a disaster for the far-right, and Vanguard America specifically, due to James Alex Fields, who attended the rally carrying a shield with the Vanguard America logo, and wore the Vanguard America uniform of a white polo and khakis, later drove into a crowd killing a counter-protester. Irizarry has insisted that Fields had no affiliation to Vanguard America, and his presence alongside Vanguard America was due to poor leadership and uncooordination on the part of Rousseau.

=== Breakup of Vanguard America ===
As Irizarry dealt with the aftermath of the rally, Rousseau, the Southern Front and most of the more moderate neo-Fascists split to form Patriot Front, seizing Vanguard America's website and discord servers. Despite this, Irizarry and Vanguard America continued to limp along, until 2018 when the more radical neo-Nazis split to form the National Socialist Legion, after which Vanguard America has shown "very few signs of life" with Irizarry largely disappearing from public view.

== Personal life ==
Irizarry has a brother who lives in Roswell. Following his return to civilian life Irizarry has frequently moved around the country, living in California and Ohio and by the time of Unite the Right had his official residence listed as in Indiana.

== Views ==
Irizarry has explicitly stated that he and Vanguard America are not white supremacists or neo-Nazis but that he cares for "my ethnicity above any others" and has labeled himself as a Fascist. Despite this, Irizarry also said he is opposed to multiculturalism, and claims the United States is a country for white people.
