= White Lives Matter =

White supremacist slogan

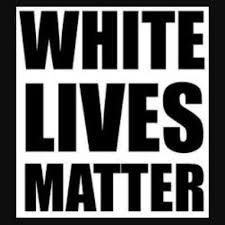
- The slogan made in a style mimicking that of Black Lives Matter graphics
- Date: 2015–present
- Location: International, largely in the United States
- Also known as: White Lives Matter movement; WLM
- Motive: White supremacy

White Lives Matter (WLM) is a white supremacist slogan that emerged in 2015 as a reaction to the Black Lives Matter social justice movement that started a few years prior. The phrase has been used by neo-Nazis, Neo-Confederates, and other white supremacist groups to recruit new members into white supremacist movements and demonstrations. Proponents of the slogan argue that they use it to raise awareness against a supposed "white genocide" and build support for a white ethnostate, and it has been frequently found at "pro-white" rallies across the United States.

== Rallies ==
=== Finland ===
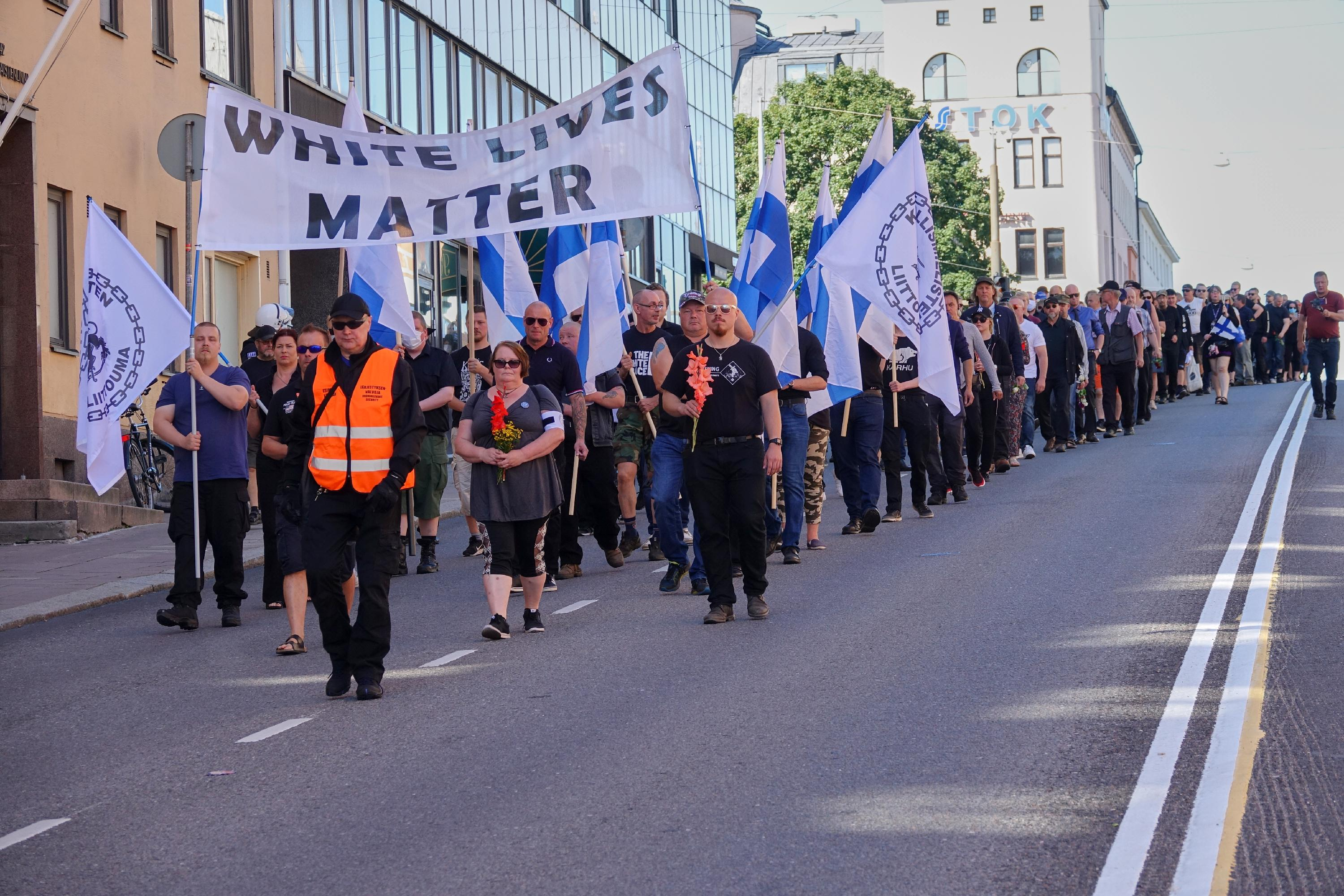
White Lives Matter rally in Turku

Far-right Finns Party Minister of Economic Affairs Vilhelm Junnila caused controversy for speaking at a White Lives Matter demonstration in Turku, whose attendants were described as "who's who of neo-Nazis in Finland".

=== Netherlands ===
==== Election posters ====
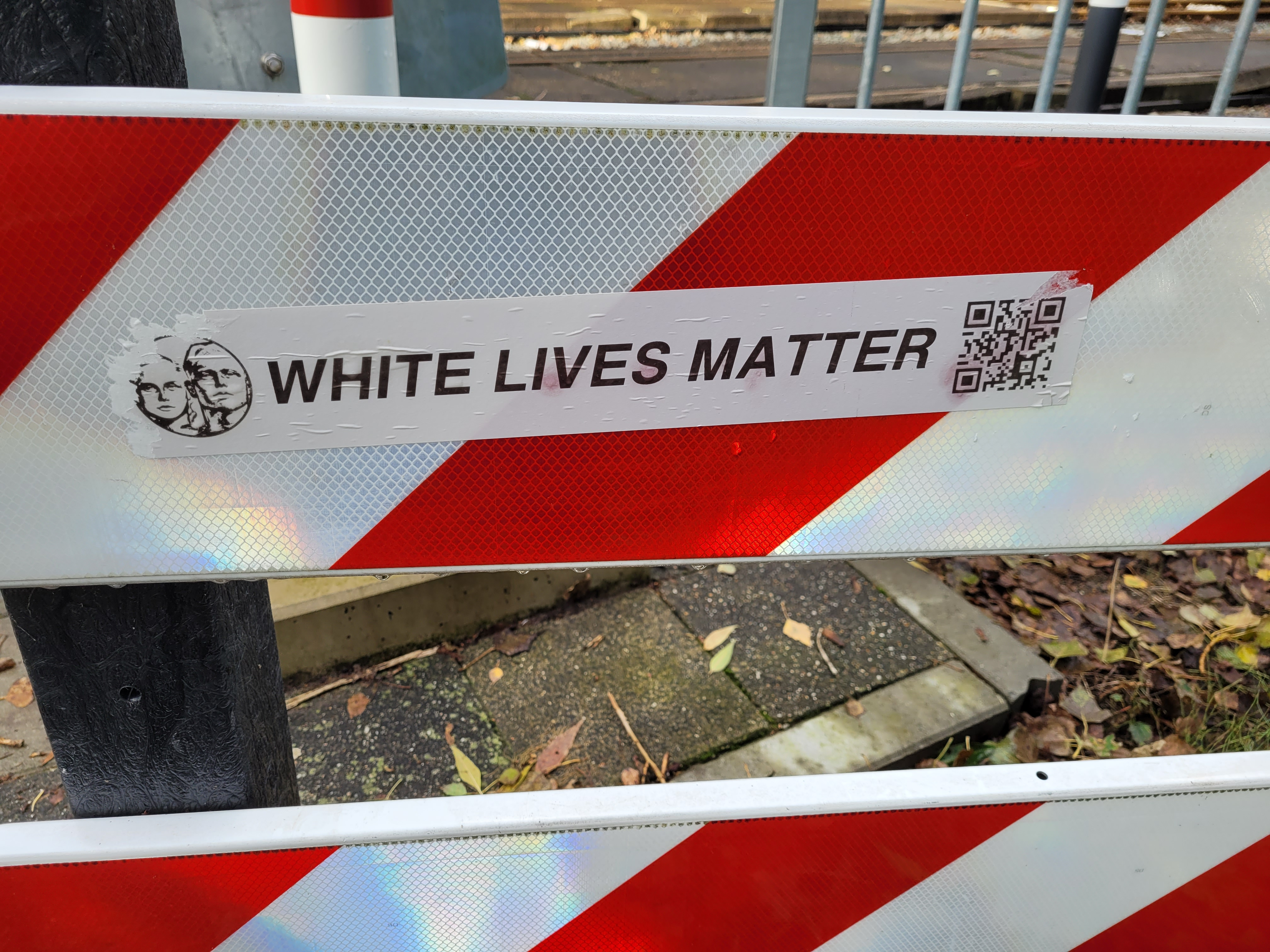
"White Lives Matter" sticker in Rotterdam

During the 2022 Dutch municipal elections in Rotterdam, stickers containing the untranslated phrase "White Lives Matter" or "traitor" (Dutch: landverrader) were put on election posters belonging to the 50Plus, DENK, GroenLinks and PvdA parties. They made a joint statement and filed criminal complaints with the police, who investigated. National party leaders Lilianne Ploumen (PvdA) and Jesse Klaver (GroenLinks) distanced themselves from the texts. The stickers referred to a Telegram group named after the phrase which had spread other stickers in other localities, including one claiming "Race-mixing is white genocide".

==== Bridge projection ====
On New Year's Eve 2022-2023, the untranslated phrase was projected onto the Erasmus Bridge, among other racist slogans including the Fourteen Words and "black pete did nothing wrong" (Dutch: zwarte piet deed niets verkeerd). Police believe it was done from a boat. The Public Prosecution Service started an investigation.

=== United Kingdom ===
The phrase WLM has also been active in the United Kingdom, albeit with a low turnout. On June 22, 2020, as players, with "Black Lives Matter" printed on their shirts in place of their names, were taking the knee before kick off to a Burnley F.C. away match to Manchester City, a plane flew over the Etihad Stadium carrying the banner "White Lives Matter Burnley". The incident was widely condemned by football authorities and anti-racism campaigners, who described the banner as racist and divisive. The next month, the pilot and his wife were both fired from their workplaces for having made racist social media posts. Later in the month, a "White Lives Matter" slogan was etched into a park hillside in Bedworth, England. Police, who were treating it as racially-aggravated criminal damage and a hate crime, were aware of footage on social media appearing to show someone in clothing "resembling a Ku Klux Klan outfit" at the same site. In response to the use of the phrase "White Lives Matter," many individuals and organizations in the UK have emphasized the need to promote inclusivity and equality for all individuals, regardless of their race, ethnicity, or background.

On June 2, 2026, in the wake of the murder of Henry Nowak, Reform UK leader Nigel Farage stated in an emergency address that “white lives matter just as much as black lives”. His statement was condemned by the prime minister Keir Starmer.

=== United States ===
==== California ====
In April 2021, a rally in Huntington Beach, California, organized by a group called the "White Lives Matter Foundation," drew a small crowd of supporters and a much larger group of counter-protesters. The event remained largely peaceful, but there were some clashes between the two groups and several arrests were made. In May 2021, a similar rally organized by the same group in Raleigh, North Carolina, was canceled due to low turnout and concerns about potential violence. A counter-protest organized by local anti-fascist groups still took place, but it also had a relatively small turnout.

In October 2023, during the Gaza war, around seven members of White Lives Matter California held a demonstration on a bridge in Walnut Creek, holding up signs reading "No More Wars for I$rael" and promoting the neo-Nazi propaganda film Europa: The Last Battle.

==== Ohio ====
On March 25, 2023, Molotov cocktails and an explosive were used in an attempt to burn down the Chesterland Community Church in Ohio. Aimenn D. Penny, 20, of Alliance, Ohio, was arrested based on cell phone data location and charged with the arson meant to prevent the church's hosting of a drag show performance. A search of his home turned up Nazi flags and a "White Lives Matter, Ohio," tee shirt.

==== Tennessee ====
Two White Lives Matter rallies were planned to take place on October 28, 2017, in Shelbyville and Murfreesboro, Tennessee. These rallies involved the National Socialist Movement, Traditionalist Worker Party, League of the South, and Vanguard America, all sometimes collectively known as the Nationalist Front. Many of these groups had been involved in the Unite the Right rally in Charlottesville, Virginia, in August 2017.

Group leaders stated their purpose was to address the "ongoing problem of refugee resettlement in Middle Tennessee," failure to build a border wall between the United States and Mexico, the removal of Sudan from the list of countries in the Trump travel ban, fight against the DREAM Act, as well as the Burnette Chapel shooting by Sudanese native Emmanuel Sampson.

The Shelbyville rally involved about 100 White Lives Matter supporters and about 200 counter-protestors.

The afternoon event in Murfreesboro was canceled by the organizers; the authorities estimated that around 800 to 1000 people took part in the anti-racist march and counter-protest.

In addition, local community and faith activists organized an off-site rally under the moniker of "Murfreesboro Loves". Hundreds participated in the event in support of refugees and minorities.

==== Other locations ====
In 2021, "White Lives Matter" rallies were held in Raleigh, North Carolina; Philadelphia; New York City; Albuquerque, New Mexico; and Fort Worth, Texas. These rallies had counter-protestors outnumber the far-right attendance, in at least one instance there were hundreds of counter protestors.

A similar "White Lives Matter" protest was held in Frisco, Texas following the racial killing of Austin Metcalf in April 2025, called "Protect White Americans".

=== World's Indigenous Peoples day ===
A growing number of White nationalist groups around the world have held an annual White Lives Matter activism which coincides with the United Nations designated International Day of the World's Indigenous Peoples observed on August 9 each year. The UK's Patriotic Alternative and New Zealand's Action Zealandia have done this.

== Involvement with the media ==
The "White Lives Matter" movement has received some media coverage, but much of it has been critical and has focused on the movement's ties to white nationalism and white supremacy. Some members of the movement have used social media to organize rallies and events and to promote their ideology. In recent years, social media platforms such as Facebook, Twitter, and YouTube have taken steps to remove content promoting hate speech, including content related to the "White Lives Matter" movement.

== Usage ==
=== Kanye West ===
On October 3, 2022, during his YZY SZN 9 fashion show in Paris, Kanye West wore a shirt with the slogan "White Lives Matter" written on it, a move described by Forbes as controversial. Conservative commentator Candace Owens posed for a photo with West wearing a matching shirt with the slogan. He explained his choice in the following way: "At a certain point, it felt like I saw White people wearing shirts that said Black Lives Matter, like, they were doing me such a favor by having a t-shirt that reminded me that my life mattered. Like I didn't already know that. So, I thought I'd return the favor and let White people know, that hey, your life matters, too."

== See also ==
- All Lives Matter
