= Anti-Communist Action =

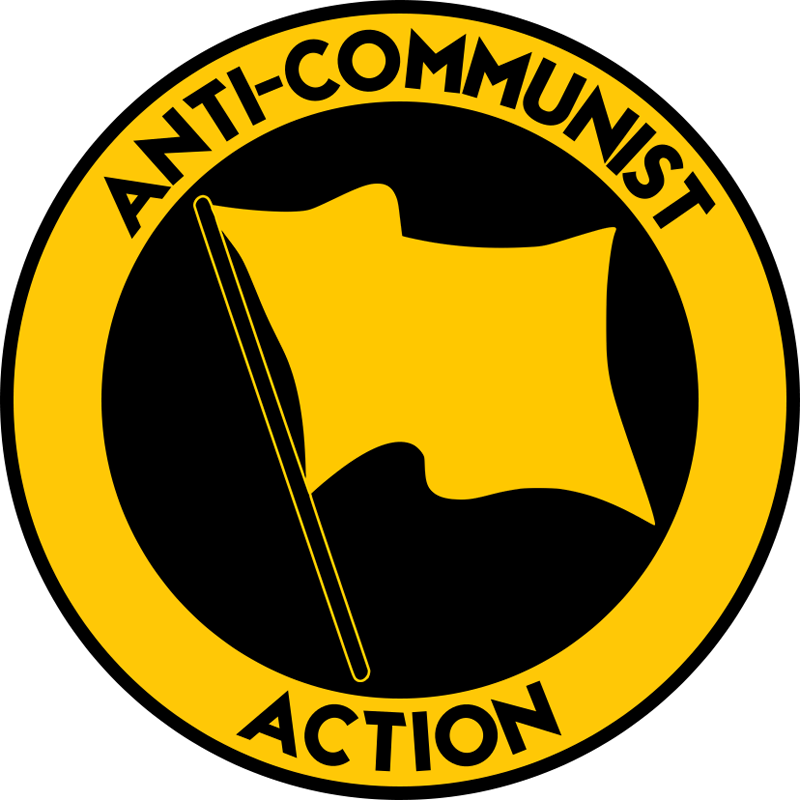
- Abbreviation: Anticom
- Founder: Seth Vitco
- Founded: 2016; 10 years ago
- Ideology: Radical anti-communism Neo-fascism; Neo-Nazism; Pinochetism; White nationalism White supremacy
- Political position: Far-right (Note: Sources which describe the group as far-right or right-wing extremist include: Merelli, Annalisa (October 27, 2017). "What to expect when white supremacists rally in Tennessee this weekend". Quartz. "Vanguard America, Anti-Communist Action and The Right Stuff also are white-supremacist, far-right groups, all with strong xenophobic and anti-Semitic messages."; Kight, Stef W. "The many groups making noise on the far-right". Axios.; "White Supremacists Share Bomb-Making Materials in Online Chats". ProPublica. A.C. Thompson, Ali Winston. November 2, 2017. "Right-wing extremists communicating in confidential online chats in recent months have shared scores of documents detailing the manufacture and use of bombs, grenades, mines and other incendiary devices. ... Anticom openly embraces fascist ideology and imagery, and the group's members have engaged in hate-filled talk involving Jews, Muslims, immigrants and African Americans.")

Party flag

Anti-Communist Action, also shortened to Anticom, is a far-right political organization based in the United States and Canada. The group has described itself as "the right's response to antifa." Anticom has espoused neo-Nazi ideology and members have attended neo-Nazi events. The group has provided security for various alt-right and white supremacist rallies. Anticom has overlapping membership with the neo-Nazi terrorist group Atomwaffen Division and has shared information on combat and bomb-making.

== Organizing the White Lives Matter rally ==
The group was a lead organizer of the 2017 White Lives Matter rally alongside the neo-Nazi groups National Socialist Movement, Traditionalist Workers Party and Vanguard America as well as the Southern nationalist League of the South and the Ku Klux Klan. The group was also a lead member of the Unite the Right rally. In September 2017, members planned an event similar to the Unite the Right rally titled "March Against Communism" in Charlotte, North Carolina, on December 28, 2017, with speakers including white nationalists such as August Sol Invictus and Richard B. Spencer as well as a representative of the white supremacist organization Vanguard America. Anticom later cancelled the event due to safety concerns.

== Violent rhetoric and promotion of mass killings, influence from Pinochet's policies ==
According to the Seattle, WA Patch, the organization is not specifically aligned with white supremacists. While the group has stated that it accepts members of all races, leaked chat logs included violent rhetoric against minorities in the organization. A chat log from the 2017 Berkeley protests promised the event would turn into a "bloodbath". Some members of the movement have promoted mass killing against minorities and the overthrow of the government. In 2017, ProPublica estimated the organization as having 1,200 participants in its chat room. The organization uses yellow and black flags and symbols as a reference to libertarianism in the United States. Some flags also depict people being thrown from helicopters, a reference to executions during Augusto Pinochet's military dictatorship of Chile (1973–1990). A ProPublica report detailed leaked chat logs from the organization calling for violence. A representative for the group stated that the report was true, but that it was not encouraged by leaders of the organization.
