= Nationalist Social Club-131 =

American neo-Nazi organization

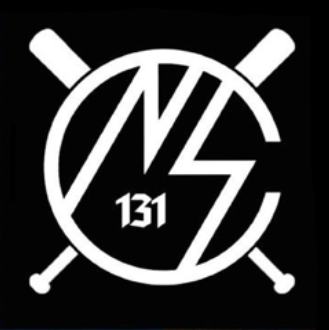
- Other name: NSC-131
- Founder: Chris Hood
- Founded: 2019; 7 years ago
- Split from: Patriot Front
- Country: United States
- Active regions: Northeastern United States
- Ideology: Neo-Nazism
- Political position: Far-right
- Status: active
- Size: 30–40 (2023)

Nationalist Social Club-131, or NSC-131, is an American neo-Nazi organization; the numbers 131 are an alphanumeric code for "Anti-Communist Action". It was founded in 2019 in eastern Massachusetts by Chris Hood, who had previously tried other neo-fascist groups such as Patriot Front, the Proud Boys, and the Base. The group first attracted the attention of anti-extremism researchers during the George Floyd protests in mid-2020, which NSC-131 members hoped to leverage to increase their recruiting. Along with Patriot Front, NSC-131 is one of the most active white nationalist groups in New England as of 2022.

== Activities ==
=== 2021 ===
The group stated on social media that they were present at the January 6 United States Capitol attack in 2021; accounts differ as to if any of their members were arrested. (Note: The group's profile by the Southern Poverty Law Center states, "No members of the group have faced charges related to their apparent involvement in the insurrection as of this writing." Other, non-free, sources appear to indicate otherwise.) The group increased its channel subscriber membership by 250 people in the wake of the attack. According to NSC-131, the group provided security to Super Happy Fun America, although the latter group disclaimed any ties with NSC-131.

=== 2022 ===
In March 2022, the group attracted attention by bringing signs to the Boston Saint Patrick's Day parade stating "keep Boston Irish". The group was condemned by the parade's organizer and local politicians including the mayor of Boston, Michelle Wu. The Dropkick Murphys condemned the unlicensed use of their song, "The Boys are Back", in a 2022 music video produced by NSC-131 and threatened legal action in a cease and desist letter.

On December 12, 2022, about 25 to 30 NSC-131 members protested outside of the public library in Fall River, Massachusetts, to disrupt a Drag Queen Story Hour reading to children. The members stood outside wearing tan pants and black jackets, all wearing black balaclava-style masks, holding a cloth banner with "Drag Queens are Pedophiles" painted on the banner.

=== 2023 ===
On January 14, 2023, a group wearing the same apparel and displaying a nearly identical sign appeared at the public library in Taunton, Massachusetts, to disrupt another Drag Queen Story Hour. Some of the members went inside and shouted at the readers; the Taunton Police Department stated the organization was nonviolent and no arrests were made. The library in Fall River also hosted another Drag Queen Story Hour on the same day; however, this one was not interrupted as the group was protesting in Taunton.

On January 17, 2023, the Attorney General of New Hampshire, John Formella, and the police chief of Portsmouth, Mark Newport, announced an Initiation of Enforcement Action by the New Hampshire Department of Justice Civil Rights Unit against NSC-131, Chris Hood and Leo Anthony Cullinan for violating the New Hampshire Civil Rights Act and conspiring to violate the New Hampshire Civil Rights Act. The charges stemmed from members of the group displaying a banner reading "Keep New England White" while allegedly trespassing on public property, with the state asserting that their actions were motivated by race. The charges were eventually dismissed by Rockingham County Superior Court Judge David Ruoff, and were ruled unconstitutional by the state's supreme court in January 2025.

NSC-131 launched a new group, the People's Initiative of New England (PINE), in April 2023. A 2023 report from the Anti-Defamation League stated that PINE's goals included secession from the U.S., the creation of a "white homeland", and the end to immigration by non-white people.

In August 2023, NSC-131 claimed credit on social media for an anti-immigration protest in front of three hotels in Woburn, Massachusetts, that the city had announced were housing around 60 migrant families. In October, the group protested in Arlington, Massachusetts, outside the home of Maura Healey, the Governor of Massachusetts, reportedly chanting "New England is ours, the rest must go." No arrests occurred.

In October 2023, the group left flyers on porches in the Buttonwood Park area of New Bedford, Massachusetts, advocating for white males of European descent to join. The city mayor, Jon Mitchell, condemned the group and reported them to the FBI.

On December 13, 2023, the New Hampshire Attorney General's office filed a civil rights lawsuit against NSC-131, Hood, and 19 unnamed members for violating the state's anti-discrimination law, for their actions of June 18, 2023, trying to stop a drag story hour in Concord through acts of intimidation, such as pounding on the glass. Hood's attorney described Formella's complaint as "virtue signaling". If found guilty, NSC-131, Hood, and each of the 19 unnamed members could face penalties of up to $10,000.

=== 2024 ===
On February 10, 2024, members of NSC-131 again demonstrated outside the home of Massachusetts governor Healey. An estimated 25 members of the group demonstrated for less than 15 minutes; no arrests were made. It was later reported that Healey was out of state at the time.

On March 9, 2024, members of PINE demonstrated in Portsmouth, New Hampshire—masked members of the group waved flags (which appeared to be the Flag of New England) near the North Church.

On May 24, 2024, Stephen Thomas Farrea, a member of the NSC-131, was arrested on one count of possessing child pornography.

On October 1, 2024, a New Hampshire judge denied a motion to dismiss charges against NSC-131 stemming from their actions to stop a drag story hour in Concord in June 2023.

=== 2025 ===
In January 2025, the New Hampshire Supreme Court ruled that civil rights charges against members of NSC-131, stemming from an incident in July 2022 when members displayed a banner reading "Keep New England White" from a highway overpass in Portsmouth, were unconstitutional.

=== 2026 ===
In late July 2026, the attorney general of New Hampshire announced that Hood admitted to violating the state's discrimination laws during the incident at the drag queen story hour in June 2023—Hood was ordered to pay a $10,000 civil fine (of which, 75% could be suspended if he complies with the court's order) and he was ordered to complete 250 hours of community service.

== Membership ==
NSC-131 has chapters around the U.S. and has claimed chapters in France, Germany, and Hungary. In 2023, The Boston Globe reported that the group had around 30 to 40 members. Its members have also been members of the groups Aryan Strikeforce, The Base, and Patriot Front.
