= Neo-fascism =

Post–World War II ideology

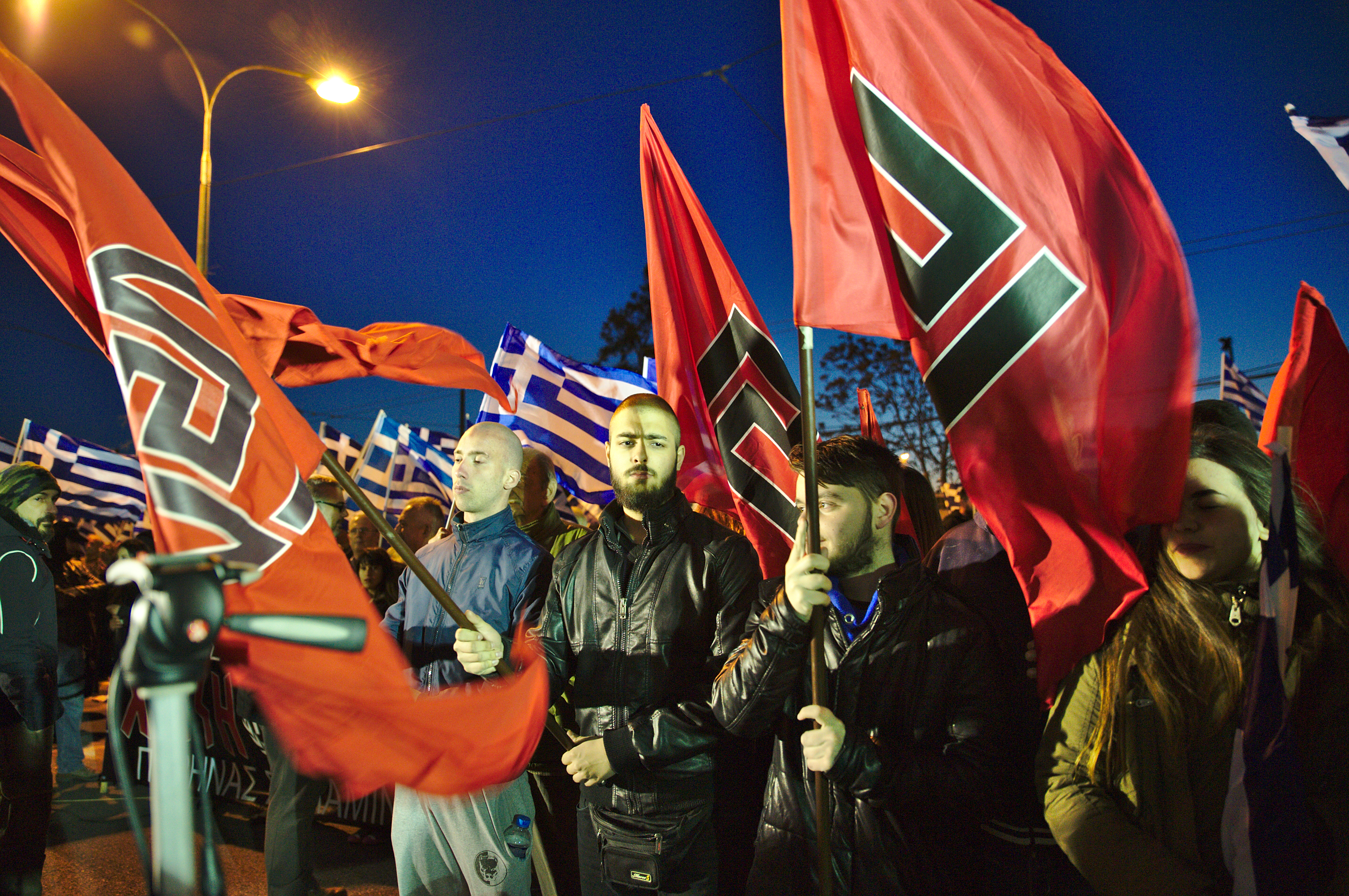
Members of the Greek neo-fascist organisation Golden Dawn in 2015

Neo-fascism is a post-World War II far-right ideology which includes significant elements of fascism. Neo-fascism usually includes ultranationalism, ultraconservatism, racial supremacy, right-wing populism, authoritarianism, nativism, xenophobia, and anti-immigration sentiment, as well as opposition to social democracy, parliamentarianism, Marxism, communism, socialism, liberalism, neoliberalism, and liberal democracy.

== History ==
According to Jean-Yves Camus and Nicolas Lebourg, neo-fascism emerged in 1942 after Nazi Germany invaded the USSR and decided to reorient its propaganda on a Europeanist ground. Europe then became both the myth and the utopia of the neo-fascists, who abandoned previous theories of racial inequalities within the white race to share a common euro-nationalist stance in the aftermath of World War II, embodied in Oswald Mosley's Europe a Nation policy. The following chronology can therefore be delineated: an ideological gestation before 1919; the historical experience of fascism between 1919 and 1942, unfolded in several phases; and finally neo-fascism from 1942 onward.

Drawing inspiration from the Italian Social Republic, institutional neo-fascism took the form of the Italian Social Movement (MSI). It became one of the chief reference points for the European far-right until the late 1980s, and "the best (and only) example of a Neofascist party", in the words of political scientist Cas Mudde. At the initiative of the MSI, the European Social Movement was established in 1951 as a pan-European organization of like-minded neo-fascist groups and figures such as the Francoist Falange, Maurice Bardèche, Per Engdahl, and Oswald Mosley. Other organizations like Jeune Nation called in the late 1950s for an extra-parliamentarian insurrection against the regime in what amounts to a remnant of pre-war fascist strategies. The main driving force of neo-fascist movements was what they saw as the defense of a Western civilization from the rise of both communism and the Third World, in some cases the loss of the colonial empire.

In 1961, Maurice Bardèche redefined the nature of fascism in a book deemed influential in the European far-right at large entitled Qu'est-ce que le fascisme? (What Is Fascism?). He argued that previous fascists had essentially made two mistakes in that they focused their efforts on the methods rather than the original "idea"; and they wrongly believed that fascist society could be achieved via the nation-state as opposed to the construction of Europe. According to him, fascism could survive the 20th century in a new metapolitical guise if its theorists succeed in building inventive methods adapted to the changes of their times; the aim being the promotion of the core politico-cultural fascist project rather than vain attempts to revive doomed regimes: In addition, Bardèche wrote: "The single party, the secret police, the public displays of Caesarism, even the presence of a Führer are not necessarily attributes of fascism. ... The famous fascist methods are constantly revised and will continue to be revised. More important than the mechanism is the idea which fascism has created for itself of man and freedom. ... With another name, another face, and with nothing which betrays the projection from the past, with the form of a child we do not recognize and the head of a young Medusa, the Order of Sparta will be reborn: and paradoxically it will, without doubt, be the last bastion of Freedom and the sweetness of living."

In the spirit of Bardèche's strategy of disguise through framework change, the MSI had developed a policy of inserimento (insertion, entryism), which relied on gaining political acceptance via the cooperation with other parties within the democratic system. In the political context of the Cold War, anti-communism began to replace anti-fascism as the dominant trend in liberal democracies. In Italy, the MSI became a support group in parliament for the Christian Democratic government in the late 1950s–early 1960s, but was forced back into "political ghetto" after anti-fascist protests and violent street clashes occurred between radical leftist and far-right groups, leading to the demise of the short-lived fascist-backed Tambroni Cabinet in July 1960.

The psychologist David Pavón-Cuéllar, of the Universidad Michoacana de San Nicolás de Hidalgo, has argued that the emergence of neoliberalism in the late-twentieth century prompted neoliberalist politicians to utilize neo-fascism as a means to remove all limits to capital (including labor laws, social rights and tariffs). According to Pavón-Cuéllar, this is done by employing the aestheticization of politics and by using the narcissism of small differences to find a target for hate, maintain a social hierarchy instead of protecting all individuals.

== Causes and description ==
A number of historians and political scientists have pointed out that the situations in a number of European countries in the 1980s and 1990s, in particular France, Germany and Italy, were in some significant ways analogous to the conditions in Europe in the period between World War I and World War II that gave rise to fascism in its many national guises. Constant economic crises including high unemployment, a resurgence of nationalism, an increase in ethnic conflicts, and the geo-political weakness of national regimes were all present, and while not an exact one-to-one correspondence, circumstances were similar enough to promote the beginning of neo-fascism as a new fascist movement. Because intense nationalism is almost always a part of neo-fascism, the parties which make up this movement are not pan-European, but are specific to each country they arise in; other than this, the neo-fascist parties and other groups have many ideological traits in common.

While certainly fascistic in nature, it is claimed by some that there are differences between neo-fascism and what can be called "historical fascism", or the kind of neo-fascism which came about in the immediate aftermath of World War II. Some historians claim that contemporary neo-fascist parties are not anti-democratic because they operate within their country's political system. Whether that is a significant difference between neo-fascism and historical fascism is doubted by other scholars, who point out that Hitler worked within the existing political system of the Weimar Republic to obtain power, although it took an anti-democratic but constitutional process in the form of presidential appointment rather than election through the Reichstag. Others point to the current neo-fascists not being totalitarian in nature, but the organization of their parties along the lines of the Führerprinzip would seem to indicate otherwise. Historian Stanley G. Payne claims that the differences in current circumstance to that of the interwar years, and the strengthening of democracy in European countries since the end of the war prevents a general return of historical fascism, and causes true neo-fascist groups to be small and remain on the fringe. For Payne, groups like the National Front in France are not neo-fascists in nature, but are merely "right radical parties" that will, in the course of time, moderate their positions in order to achieve electoral victory.

The problem of immigrants, both legal and illegal or irregular, whether called "foreigners", "foreign workers", "economic refugees", "ethnic minorities", "asylum seekers", or "aliens", is a core neo-fascist issue, intimately tied to their nativism, ultranationalism, and xenophobia, but the specifics differ somewhat from country to country due to prevailing circumstances. In general, the anti-immigrant impetus is strong when the economy is weak or unemployment is high, and people fear that outsiders are taking their jobs. Because of this, neo-fascist parties have more electoral traction during hard economic times. Again, this mirrors the situation in the interwar years, when, for instance, Germany suffered from incredible hyperinflation and many people had their life savings swept away. In the wake of the 2008 financial crisis, some neo-fascist groups likewise argued for a Third Position as an alternative to market capitalism.

In contemporary Europe, mainstream political parties see the electoral advantage the neo-fascist and far-right parties get from their strong emphasis on the supposed problem of the outsider, and are then tempted to co-opt the issue by moving somewhat to the right on the immigrant issue, hoping to slough off some voters from the hard right. In the absence in post-war Europe of a strong socialist movement, this has the tendency to move the political centre to the right overall.

While both historical fascism and contemporary neo-fascism are xenophobic, nativist and anti-immigrant, neo-fascist leaders are careful not to present these views in so strong a manner as to draw obvious parallels to historical events. Both Jean-Marie Le Pen of France's National Front and Jörg Haider's Freedom Party of Austria, in the words of historian Tony Judt, "revealed [their] prejudices only indirectly". Jews would not be castigated as a group, but a person would be specifically named as a danger who just happened to be a Jew. The public presentation of their leaders is one principal difference between the neo-fascists and historical fascists: their programs have been "finely honed and 'modernized'" to appeal to the electorate, a "far-right ideology with a democratic veneer". Modern neo-fascists do not appear in "jackboots and brownshirts", but in suits and ties. The choice is deliberate, as the leaders of the various groups work to differentiate themselves from the brutish leaders of historical fascism and also to hide whatever bloodlines and connections tie the current leaders to the historical fascist movements. When these become public, as they did in the case of Haider, it can lead to their decline and fall.

== International networks ==
In 1951, the New European Order (NEO) neo-fascist European-wide alliance was set up to promote pan-European nationalism. It was a more radical splinter group of the European Social Movement. The NEO had its origins in the 1951 Malmö conference, when a group of rebels led by René Binet and Maurice Bardèche refused to join the European Social Movement as they felt that it did not go far enough in terms of racialism and anti-communism. As a result, Binet joined with Gaston-Armand Amaudruz in a second meeting that same year in Zürich to set up a second group pledged to wage war on communists and non-white people.

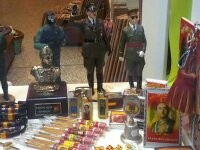
Francoist-Falangist and Nazi memorabilia in a shop in Toledo, Spain

Several Cold War regimes and international neo-fascist movements collaborated in operations such as assassinations and false flag bombings. Stefano Delle Chiaie, who was involved in Italy's Years of Lead, took part in Operation Condor; organizing the 1976 assassination attempt on Chilean Christian Democrat Bernardo Leighton. Vincenzo Vinciguerra escaped to Francoist Spain with the help of the SISMI, following the 1972 Peteano attack, for which he was sentenced to life. Along with Delle Chiaie, Vinciguerra testified in Rome in December 1995 before judge María Servini de Cubría, stating that Enrique Arancibia Clavel (a former Chilean secret police agent prosecuted for crimes against humanity in 2004) and US expatriate DINA agent Michael Townley were directly involved in General Carlos Prats' assassination. Michael Townley was sentenced in Italy to 15 years of prison for having served as intermediary between the DINA and the Italian neo-fascists.

The regimes of Francoist Spain, Augusto Pinochet's Chile and Alfredo Stroessner's Paraguay participated together in Operation Condor, which targeted political opponents worldwide. During the Cold War, these international operations gave rise to some cooperation between various neo-fascist elements engaged in a "Crusade against Communism". Anti-Fidel Castro terrorist Luis Posada Carriles was condemned for the Cubana Flight 455 bombing on 6 October 1976. According to the Miami Herald, this bombing was decided on at the same meeting during which it was decided to target Chilean former minister Orlando Letelier, who was assassinated on 21 September 1976. Carriles wrote in his autobiography that "we the Cubans didn't oppose ourselves to an isolated tyranny, nor to a particular system of our fatherland, but that we had in front of us a colossal enemy, whose main head was in Moscow, with its tentacles dangerously extended on all the planet."

The March 2015 International Russian Conservative Forum organized by pro-Putin Rodina-party has been described as a neo-Fascist event by multiple sources. The event was attended by fringe groups like Nordic Resistance Movement from Scandinavia but also by more mainstream MEPs from Golden Dawn and National Democratic Party of Germany. In addition to Rodina, Russian Imperial Movement and Rusich Group were also in attendance. The event was attended by several notable American white supremacists including Jared Taylor and Brandon Russell.

== Europe ==
=== Finland ===
In Finland, neo-fascism is often connected to the 1930s and 1940s fascist and pro-Nazi Patriotic People's Movement (IKL), its youth movement Blues-and-Blacks and its predecessor Lapua Movement. Post-war fascist groups such as Patriotic People's Movement (1993), Patriotic Popular Front, Patriotic National Movement, Blue-and-Black Movement and many others consciously copy the style of the movement and look up to its leaders as inspiration. A Finns Party councillor and police officer in Seinäjoki caused small scandal wearing the fascist blue-and-black uniform.

Suomen Sisu has been identified as neo-fascist and members of Suomen Sisu have given statements understood as condoning fascism such as Juho Eerola saying "a lot can be learned" from Mussolini. Members of Suomen Sisu have risen to prominent positions: Jussi Halla-aho is Speaker of the Parliament and Olli Immonen is the General Secretary of the Finns Party.

Neo-fascist "Awakening" conference is held annually in Finland, attracting some hundreds of white supremacists from around the globe. The event has been attended by fascists from around the world; Jared Taylor of American Renaissance, Kevin MacDonald, representatives of the National Corps and others.

=== France ===
In France, the far-right National Rally party is of neo-fascist origin and is frequently accused of promoting anti-semitism and xenophobia. The party was founded in 1972 to unify the French nationalist movement by Holocaust denier Jean-Marie Le Pen, who was its leader until his resignation in 2011. Jean-Marie Le Pen's daughter, Marine Le Pen, has also been the party's leader and Marine Le Pen's niece, Marion Maréchal has repeated anti-Islam rhetoric such as "We know what we are and we know what we are not. We are not an Islamic nation." Pierre Bousquet, a co-founder, was in the Nazi Waffen-SS during World War II.

=== Germany ===
Since German reunification there has been an increase of support for fascism in Germany, primarily led by the National Democratic Party of Germany and Alternative for Germany. Both parties support the concept of ethnic nationalism such as the deportations of German citizens who belong to certain ethnicities.

In 2013, former officials of the neo-Nazi NPD founded Third Way, another neo-Nazi party, partially linked to Strasserism.

=== Greece ===
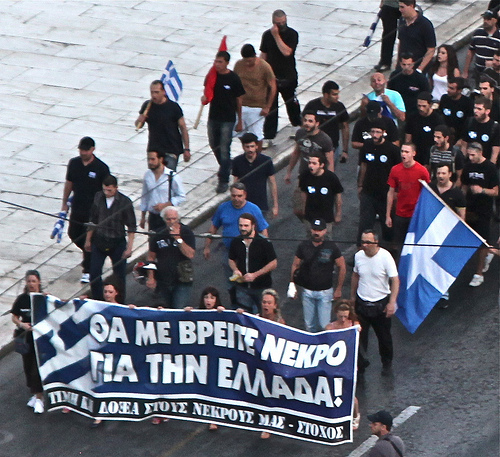
Golden Dawn demonstration in Greece, 2012 (I will be found dead for Greece is written on the banner.)

On 21 April 1967, a group of right-wing colonels overthrew the government of Greece and established a military junta. The resulting Greek junta has been widely characterized as neo-fascist. The junta's ultranationalist, militaristic, and deeply anti-communist character has been likened to that of the interwar dictatorship of Ioannis Metaxas, leading to many scholars describing the regime as fascistic.

After the onset of the Great Recession and economic crisis in Greece, a movement known as the Golden Dawn, widely considered a neo-Nazi party, soared in support out of obscurity and won seats in Greece's parliament, espousing a staunch hostility towards minorities, illegal immigrants and refugees. In 2013, after the murder of an anti-fascist musician by a person with links to Golden Dawn, the Greek government ordered the arrest of Golden Dawn's leader Nikolaos Michaloliakos and other Golden Dawn members on charges related to being associated with a criminal organization. Golden Dawn after emerging as a major political was engaged in numerous murder and criminal trials, such as the murder of Pavlos Fyssas. Following years long legal investigation sentenced its leaders to prison.

In October, 2020, the court declared Golden Dawn to be a criminal organization, convicting 68 members of various crimes including murder. However, far-right politics continue to be strong in Greece, such as Ilias Kasidiaris' National Party – Greeks, an Ultranationalist party. In 2021, Greek neo-Nazi youth attacked a rival group at a school in Greece. Following the collapse of Golden Dawn, various neo-Fascist political parties emerged including the Spartans.

=== Italy ===
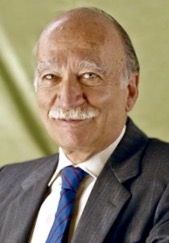
Giorgio Almirante, leader of the Italian Social Movement

Italy was broadly divided into two political blocs following World War II: the Christian Democrats, who remained in power until the 1990s, and the Italian Communist Party (PCI), which was very strong immediately after the war and achieved a large consensus during the 1970s. With the beginning of the Cold War, the American and British governments turned a blind eye to the refusal of Italian authorities to honor requested extraditions of Italian war criminals to Yugoslavia, which they feared would benefit the PCI. With no event such as the Nuremberg trials taking place for Italian war crimes, the collective memory of the crimes committed by Italian fascists was excluded from public media, from textbooks in Italian schools, and even from the academic discourse on the Western side of the Iron Curtain throughout the Cold War. The PCI was expelled from power in May 1947, a month before the Paris Conference on the Marshall Plan, along with the French Communist Party (PCF).

In 1946, a group of Italian fascist soldiers founded the Italian Social Movement (MSI) to continue advocating the ideas of Benito Mussolini. The leader of the MSI was Giorgio Almirante, who remained at the head of the party until his death in 1988. Despite attempts in the 1970s towards a "historic compromise" between the PCI and the DC, the PCI did not have a role in executive power until the 1980s. In December 1970, Junio Valerio Borghese attempted, along with Stefano Delle Chiaie, the Borghese Coup which was supposed to install a neo-fascist regime. Neo-fascist groups took part in various false flag terrorist attacks, starting with the December 1969 Piazza Fontana massacre, for which Vincenzo Vinciguerra was convicted, and they are usually considered to have stopped with the 1980 Bologna railway bombing.

Recent studies have studied the geopolitical role of Italian neofascism with some groups participating with CIA-backing in the Strategy of Tension during the Cold War where terrorists actions were aimed to keep Italy in NATO and prevent the Communist Party from coming to power. This was also one of the goals of the Masonic lodge Propaganda Due (P2), that became a far-right neo-fascist criminal organization under Licio Gelli, one of the organizers of the Bologna massacre, realized by the Nuclei Armati Rivoluzionari (NAR).

In 1987, the reins of the MSI party were taken by Gianfranco Fini, under whom in 1995 it was dissolved and transformed into the National Alliance (AN). The party led by Fini distanced itself from Mussolini and fascism and made efforts to improve its relations with the Jewish community, becoming a conservative right-wing party until its merger with Silvio Berlusconi's Forza Italia into the centre-right party The People of Freedom in 2009. Neo-fascist parties in Italy include the Tricolour Flame (Fiamma Tricolore), the New Force (Forza Nuova), the National Social Front (Fronte Sociale Nazionale), CasaPound, and The Right (La Destra), which merged into the neo-fascist National Movement for Sovereignty, which in turn merged into FdI. The national-conservative Brothers of Italy (FdI), main heirs of MSI and AN, has been described as neo-fascist by several academics, and it has some neo-fascist factions within their internal organization, including its youth wing. The results of the 2022 Italian general election, in which FdI became the first party, have been variously described as Italy's first far-right-led government in the republican era and its most right-wing government since World War II. The Russia-Ukraine war has divided the Italian far right, including neo-fascists, into three clusters: the pro-Western and Atlanticist extreme right (e.g. CasaPound), nostalgic and pro-Putin neo-fascism (New Force), and an ideologically evolving collection of National Bolshevik and Eurasianist militants.

National Future, a party born in february 2026 from a split of General Roberto Vannaci from Lega, has been described as a neo-fascist party, that has an ethno-essentialist conception of citizenship and promotes remigration.

=== Poland ===
In Poland, National Movement has been described as a national-conservative neo-fascist party, with militarist tendencies. The party has also had relations with Jobbik and Forza Nuova, inviting them, together with FN youth wing Lotta Studentesca, to visit the Sejm in Poland.

=== Portugal ===
After the fall of authoritarianism in Portugal after the Carnation Revolution of 1974, several neo-fascist groups arose such as the New Order (Portugal) which was created in 1978. A report by the European Parliament defined the ideology of the New Order as revolutionary fascist and hyper-nationalist. The group also had connections to Fuerza Nueva in Spain. The New Order was disbanded in 1982, however its activities continued to as late as 1985.

The far right and antiziganist party Chega! has been described as fascist and racist, and welcomed many neo-Nazis, white supremacists, fascists and Salazar supporters, also in their youth wing "Juventude CHEGA". The party also wants to remove the term "fascist regime" from the Constitution, a reference to the Estado Novo.

=== Romania ===
In Romania, the ultra-nationalist movement which allied itself with the Axis powers and German National Socialism was the Iron Guard, also known as the Legion of the Archangel Michael. There are some modern political organisations which consider themselves heirs of Legionarism, this includes Noua Dreaptă and the Everything For the Country Party, founded by former Iron Guard members. The latter organisation was outlawed in 2015. Aside, from these Romanian organisations, the Sixty-Four Counties Youth Movement representing ultra-nationalism from the Hungarian minority is also present, especially in Transylvania. Other nationalistic and irredentist groups such as the Greater Romania Party do not originate from Legionarism, but in fact grew out of national communist tendencies from the era of Nicolae Ceaușescu (the party was founded by his "court poet" Corneliu Vadim Tudor).

The Romanian Hearth Union (UVR), which had around 4 million supporters in 1992, has been described as neofascist. Its political branch was the Romanian National Unity Party, but had also ties to the Social Democracy Party of Romania (PDSR), Greater Romania Party (PRM) and the Democratic Agrarian Party of Romania (PDAR). One of the founders of the UVR was the Romanian President Ion Iliescu, who was still its member in 2005.

The Alliance for the Union of Romanians (AUR) has been described as neo-fascist and neo-legionarist, and also its leader George Simion has been linked to this ideology, but he denied that.

=== Russia ===
In 1990, Vladimir Zhirinovsky founded the Liberal Democratic Party of Russia. Its leader opposes democratic values, human rights, a multiparty system, and the rule of law. Encyclopedia Britannica considers Zhirinovsky to be a neo-fascist. Zhirinovsky endorsed the forcible re-occupation of Lithuania, Latvia, and Estonia, and suggested nuclear waste should be dumped there. During the First Chechen War in the mid-1990s, he advocated hitting some Chechen villages with tactical nuclear weapons.

The Russian National Unity was a paramilitary organization which was founded by Alexander Barkashov in 1990. It used a left-pointed swastika and emphasizes the "primary importance" of Russian blood. Concerning Adolf Hitler, the organizations's leader Barkashov declared: "I consider [Hitler] a great hero of the German nation and of all white races. He succeeded in inspiring the entire nation to fight against degradation and the washing away of national values." Before it was banned in 1999, and breakup in late 2000, the group estimated to have had approximately 20,000 to 25,000 members. Alexander Barkashov along with other members of the Russian National Unity have engaged in religious activities and pro-Russian activism in the Russian-Ukrainian War.

=== Serbia ===
A neo-fascist organization in Serbia was Obraz, which was banned on 12 June 2012 by the Constitutional Court of Serbia.

Earlier, on 18 June 1990, Vojislav Šešelj organized the Serbian Chetnik Movement (SČP) though it was not permitted official registration due to its obvious Chetnik identification. On 23 February 1991, it merged with the National Radical Party (NRS), establishing the Serbian Radical Party (SRS) with Šešelj as president and Tomislav Nikolić as vice president. It was a Chetnik party, oriented towards neo-fascism with a striving for the territorial expansion of Serbia.

=== Slovakia ===
Kotleba – People's Party Our Slovakia is a far-right political party with views that are considered extremist and fascist. The Party's leader, Marian Kotleba, is a former neo-Nazi, who once wore a uniform modelled on that of the Hlinka Guard, the militia of the 1939–45 Nazi-sponsored Slovak State. He opposes Romani people, immigrants, the Slovak National Uprising, NATO, the United States, and the European Union. The party also endorses the clerical fascist war criminal and former Slovak President Jozef Tiso.

In 2003, Kotleba founded the far-right political party Slovak Community (Slovak: Slovenská Pospolitosť). In 2007, the Slovak interior ministry banned the party from running and campaigning in elections. In spite of this ban, Kotleba's party got 8.04% of votes in the Slovak 2016 parliamentary elections. As of December 2022, voter support has dropped significantly to about 3.1%, under the 5% threshold required to enter parliament.

Republic Movement has been described as a neo-fascist party, and was founded by former members of the neo-Nazi party People's Party Our Slovakia, such as Milan Uhrík, Milan Mazurek, and Miroslav Suja.

=== Spain ===
Neo-fascism in Spain is often related to Francoism and Falangism.

The Falange Española de las JONS is a political party founded in 1976 that has been described as neo-fascist, ultranationalist, xenophobic, and the most important falangist group in Spain.

Democracia Nacional, a far right party founded in 1995, has been described as neo-Nazi, "lepenista", and ultranationalist.

Vox, the most important far-right party in Spain, has been described as ultranationalist, neo-Francoist, and revisionist on Francoist Spain.

National November, formerly known as National Nucleus, is a Spanish neo-nazi party which aims to unite "Francoists, Falangists, national socialists and conservatives", and also collaborates with neo-Nazi and far-right organizations such as Patriot Front, Bulgarian National Union, Union of Bulgarian National Legions, The Third Way and Die Heimat.

=== Turkey ===
Grey Wolves is a Turkish ultranationalist and neo-fascist youth organization. It is the "unofficial militant arm" of the Nationalist Movement Party. The Grey Wolves have been accused of terrorism. According to Turkish authorities, the organization carried out 694 murders during the late-1970s political violence in Turkey, between 1974 and 1980.

The nationalist political party MHP founded by Alparslan Türkeş has also been described as neo-fascist.

=== United Kingdom ===
The British National Party (BNP) is a nationalist party in the United Kingdom which espoused the ideology of fascism and anti-immigration. In the 2009 European elections, it gained two members of the European Parliament (MEPs), including former party leader Nick Griffin. Other British organisations described as fascist or neo-fascist include the National Front, Combat 18, the English Defence League, and Britain First.

== Americas ==
=== Argentina ===
In Argentina, a notable advocate of neo-fascism was president María Estela Martínez de Perón, who applied anti-communist policies under the fascist police organization Triple A and economic market opening policies. Perón made a direct apology to fascism by performing the Roman salute in an appearance on the national radio network. The National Reorganization Process has been described by some scholars as a fascist dictatorship.

=== Brazil ===
The Brazilian government of Jair Bolsonaro is cited as the rising point of neo-fascism in South America in the 21st century, based on the denial of science, bellicose rhetoric and authoritarian measures that withdraw rights from the population linked to a strongly neoliberal economic policy. As a result of factors such as opposition to Workers' Party, fear and reaction to the 2013 protests, as well as the 2008 financial crisis and 2014 Brazilian economic crisis, Jair Bolsonaro emerged as a viable option, not because of a well-defined strategic project, but almost accidentally. In this way, the multiplicity of groups that make up the Bolsonarism, the different wings (military, ideological, religious, capital, etc.) present pragmatic disagreements, strategies, objectives and distinct methods. The core of this Brazilian neo-fascism converged its interests and rhetoric with Pentecostal religious fundamentalism and both allied themselves with military sectors and liberal think tanks, so that within bolsonarism there is a power bloc made up of non-fascist conservatives and far-right neo-fascists; although still without the support of the broad and fanatical mass movement which was the basis of European fascism.

=== United States ===
Groups which are identified as neo-fascist in the United States generally include neo-Nazi and far-right organizations and movements such as the Proud Boys, the National Alliance, the American Nazi Party, the Nationalist Social Club-131, the National Socialist Movement, the National Socialist Legion, the Patriot Front, the Atomwaffen Division, the Traditionalist Worker Party, the White Aryan Resistance, the Aryan Strikeforce, the League of the South, Vanguard America, and the Anti-Communist Action. The Institute for Historical Review publishes negationist historical papers which are often antisemitic. The alt-right—a loosely connected coalition of individuals and organizations which advocates a wide range of far-right ideas, from neo-reactionism to white nationalism—is often included under the umbrella term "neo-fascist" because alt-right individuals and organizations advocate a radical form of authoritarian ultranationalism.

Some sources also described MAGA Communism as neo-fascist or related to the far right. Other sources debate this characterization.

== Oceania ==
=== Australia and New Zealand ===
The 2019 Christchurch mosque shootings at Al Noor Mosque and Linwood Islamic Centre in Christchurch, New Zealand, were carried out by Australian admitted fascist Brenton Harrison Tarrant, who also admitted to following eco-fascism and admiring Oswald Mosley. Mosley was the leader of the British fascist organization called the British Union of Fascists (BUF) in the 1930s, and he is quoted in the shooter's manifesto The Great Replacement (named after the French far-right theory of the same name).

== Africa ==
=== South Africa ===
The Economic Freedom Fighters are a self-described pan-Africanist political party founded in 2013 by the expelled former African National Congress Youth League (ANCYL) President Julius Malema, and his allies. Malema and the party have frequently courted controversy for engaging in anti-White and anti-Indian racism. In November 2019, the Professor of International Relations at University of the Witwatersrand, Vishwas Satgar, defined them as a manifestation of a new phenomenon, 'Black Neofascism' through the position that the EFF has been antagonistic to organized labour movements, principally courts and serves middle class interests and has used similar rhetorical devices to groups he described as neo-fascist in the United States and in India.

== Asia ==
=== China ===
Some scholars have argued that the similarities between the Chinese Communist Party (CCP) and classical fascist regimes lie in their proximity to capitalism and corporatism, as well as their anti-democratic, anti-labor, and chauvinistic expansionism. Contemporarily, an increasing number of scholars and journalists have drawn comparisons between fascism and the Chinese Communist Party under Xi Jinping. Axel Dessein, a British Sinologist, argues that the concept of "National Socialism" is more valid than the framework of "communism" in understanding current Chinese politics, and comparisons have been made between China and Nazi Germany. Some scholars have defined the CCP as "para-fascist" (rather than "fascist" in the pure sense). However, others have criticized the fascism label as "ahistorical" due to the absence of mass mobilization, along with its Marxist-Leninist ideological roots.

According to Eske J. Møllgaard, a Norwegian scholar who studies the comparison between Chinese and Western philosophy, the Chinese conservative Liu Xiaofeng has been assessed as having "developed Leo Strauss' philosophy in a neo-fascist direction and defends Chinese traditional culture".

=== Indonesia ===
Adolf Hitler's propaganda which advocated the hegemony of "Greater Germany" inspired similar ideas of "Indonesia Mulia" (esteemed Indonesia) and "Indonesia Raya" (great Indonesia) in the former Dutch colony. The first fascist party was the Partai Fasis Indonesia (PFI). Sukarno admired Nazi Germany under Hitler and its vision of happiness for all: "It's in the Third Reich that the Germans will see Germany at the apex above other nations in this world," he said in 1963. He stated that Hitler was 'extraordinarily clever' in 'depicting his ideals': he spoke about Hitler's rhetorical skills, but denied any association with Nazism as an ideology, saying that Indonesian nationalism was not as narrow as Nazi nationalism.

=== Israel ===
Kahanism ideology was described by Ehud Sprinzak as a "quasi-fascism". Noted Israeli sociologist Eva Illouz has described Itamar Ben-Gvir, the leader of political party Otzma Yehudit, as representative of Jewish fascism. In 1980, the Journal of Palestine Studies published an article describing the rise of fascist movements in Israel and support from governmental institutions.

=== Japan ===
After World War II, neo-fascism and ultra-nationalism were ostracized from mainstream politics in Germany, while in Japan, they were partially related to major right-wing conservative politics. Since 2006, all LDP-aligned prime ministers of Japan have been members of the far-right ultranationalist Nippon Kaigi.

In the 2025 Japanese House of Councillors election, Sanseitō, an ultraconservative and nationalist party defined as far-right, gained popularity. It has been described as restorationist, xenophobic, and anti-immigration. The party is opposed to gender equality and LGBT people and rights, and critics laws to protect them and inform on the topic. On defense, it advocates abolishing Article 9 of the Japanese Constitution for Japan to remilitarize, increase in the defense spending up to 2% of GDP and obtain nuclear weapons. The leader of the party, Sohei Kamiya, has been accused of anti-Semitism, and opposes gender equality. The party and its leader have been the subject of various controversies related to historical revisionism on the Second World War: the Pacific War wasn't a war of aggression; during the Battle of Okinawa, the Imperial Japanese Army didn't kill local people; there were no Nanjing Massacre and comfort women; Japan didn't invade China, it defended itself against terrorist attacks; the communists sent spies into the Japanese government to push it into war against China, the USSR and the USA. The party supports the creation of a new constitution, which does not include "sovereignty of the people" or "fundamental human rights", the Emperor is the ruler of the nation, and has been described as "dictatorial".

=== Mongolia ===
With Mongolia located between the larger nations Russia and China, ethnic insecurities have driven many Mongolians to neo-fascism, expressing nationalism centered around Genghis Khan and Adolf Hitler. Groups advocating these ideologies include Blue Mongolia, Dayar Mongol, and Mongolian National Union.

=== Pakistan ===
Pakistan's Tehreek-e-Labbaik Pakistan is considered fascist by some analysts because of its engagement in Islamic extremism.

=== Taiwan ===
The National Socialism Association (NSA) is a neo-fascist political organization founded in Taiwan in September 2006 by Hsu Na-chi (許娜琦), a 22-year-old female political science graduate of Soochow University. The NSA views Adolf Hitler as its leader and often uses the slogan "Long live Hitler". This has brought them condemnation from the Simon Wiesenthal Center, an international Jewish human rights centre.

== See also ==
- Anti-fascism
- Christian fascism
- Clerical fascism
- Islamofascism
- List of fascist movements
- National Bolshevism
- Palingenetic ultranationalism
- Para-fascism
- Post-fascism
- Post–World War II anti-fascism
- Third Position
