= Nationalist Front (United States) =

Loose coalition of white supremacist groups in the United States

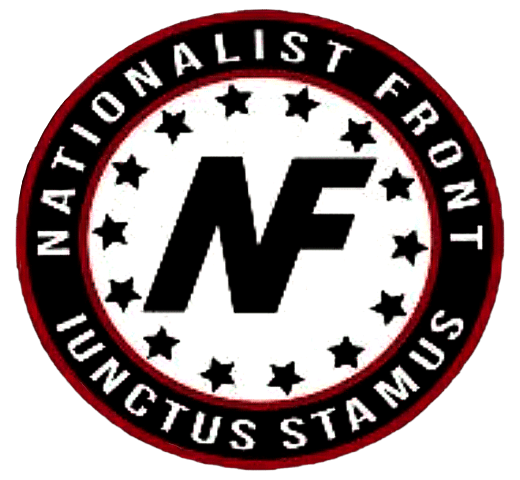
- Abbreviation: NF
- Founded: 2016
- Dissolved: 2018
- Ideology: Neo-Nazism; American nationalism White nationalism White supremacy
- Political position: Far-right
- Members: National Socialist Movement; Ku Klux Klan; Vanguard America; Traditionalist Worker Party; League of the South (2017–2018)
- Colors: Black; White; Red

The Nationalist Front (NF) was a loose coalition of radical right and white supremacist organizations. The coalition was formed in 2016 by leaders of the neo-Nazi groups National Socialist Movement (NSM) and Traditionalist Worker Party (TWP). Its aim was to unite white supremacist and white nationalist groups under a common umbrella. Originally the group was named the Aryan Nationalist Alliance and was composed of neo-Nazi, Ku Klux Klan and White power skinhead organizations.

The coalition rebranded itself as the Nationalist Front and was later joined by the neo-Confederate League of the South, the neo-Nazi/alt-right Vanguard America and four other groups such as the Aryan Strikeforce. The ideology of the Nationalist Front centered on a desire for a white ethnostate.

== History and activities ==
Conceived by the leaders of the neo-Nazi groups National Socialist Movement (NSM) and Traditionalist Worker Party (TWP), the coalition was formed in 2016. Its aim was to unite white supremacist and white nationalist groups under a common umbrella. Originally the group was named the Aryan Nationalist Alliance and was composed of neo-Nazi, Ku Klux Klan and White power skinhead organizations, the logo of the group was two hands joined with the Celtic Cross in the background and multiple Wolfsangels in the circle. The coalition later rebranded itself as the Nationalist Front with a logo that had the group initials "NF" inside a white background with a black circle with stars and the slogan "Iunctus Stamus" (United We Stand) it would also be later joined by the neo-Confederate League of the South, the neo-Nazi/alt-right Vanguard America and four other groups such as the Aryan Strikeforce.

The ideology of the Nationalist Front centers on a desire for a white ethnostate. The groups participated in the August 2017 Unite the Right rally in Charlottesville, Virginia. Earlier in the year, it organized the white supremacist rally in Pikeville, Kentucky, which attracted 100 to 125 supporters. The coalition and its member groups, were considered extremist organizations.

After the Unite the Right rally, two lawsuits targeting 21 racist "alt-right" and hate group leaders, including the National Socialist Movement and its leader at the time, Jeff Schoep, as well as the Traditionalist Worker Party were filed in the U.S. District Court for the Western District of Virginia and another lawsuit was filed in Virginia Circuit Court.

The Nationalist Front was a key organizer of the "White Lives Matter" rally in Shelbyville and Murfreesboro, Tennessee, on October 28, 2017. In 2021, there were subsequent White Lives Matter rallies in a number of cities, including New York City, Philadelphia, and Fort Worth, Texas.

In February 2018, the Traditionalist Worker Party dissolved, causing the Nationalist Front to fall apart.

== Membership ==
- National Socialist Movement
- Ku Klux Klan
- Traditionalist Worker Party (now defunct)
- League of the South (2017–2018)
- Vanguard America (splintered into Patriot Front and National Socialist Legion)

== See also ==
- Nationalist Front (Germany)
- National Front (UK)
- Nationalist Front of Mexico
- National Union Council - Umbrella organization of neo-Nazi groups
- National Front (France)
- Front National (Belgium)
- List of neo-Nazi organizations
- List of white nationalist organizations
- World Union of National Socialists - Umbrella organization of neo-Nazi groups
