= Thomas Rousseau =

American far-right activist (born 1998)

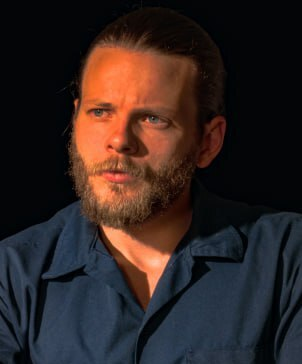
- Rousseau in 2025

Leader of Patriot Front
- Incumbent
- Assumed office August 2017
- Preceded by: Position established

Personal details
- Born: Thomas Ryan Rousseau; October 20, 1998 (age 28) Grapevine, Texas, U.S.
- Occupation: Far-right, neo-fascist activist
- Known for: Founder and leader of Patriot Front, right-wing activism

Thomas Ryan Rousseau (born October 20, 1998) is an American far-right activist known for founding and leading the neo-fascist and white supremacist group Patriot Front. The group, according to its manifesto, aims to create a white ethnostate.

== Early life ==
Rousseau is a resident of Grapevine, Texas, located between Dallas and Fort Worth, and attended Coppell High School. According to the Southern Poverty Law Center, Rousseau was a graphics editor of his high school newspaper, The Sidekick, where he wrote columns calling for banning transgender bathrooms and promoting guns on college campuses. Rousseau was a Boy Scout. He has also been on an FBI watchlist since he was in high school. In an interview with ProPublica, Rousseau's classmates said, "He seemed Republican, but he didn't seem crazy", and most people who knew Rousseau personally in Grapevine expressed surprise that he founded and leads a white supremacist group.

== Political activities ==
Rousseau founded Patriot Front in the wake of the 2017 Unite the Right rally. Rousseau attended the rally as the leader of Vanguard America (VA)'s contingent, a group he joined as a teenager.

In the weeks before the rally, Rousseau took control of Vanguard America's website and Discord server (Note: The primary form of communication for VA's membership and leadership) after feuding with the "Commander" of VA, Dillon Irizarry. As Irizarry suffered from the fallout from the rally, Rousseau used the website and Discord server to launch a new group, Patriot Front, appealing to VA members in a Discord message: "Vanguard America, as you know it, will now be the 'Patriots Front', and that the focus and goals of the group would remain the same", however, VA and Irizarry continued to operate. Despite participating in the rally, Rousseau has since denounced it as "bad activism" that damaged the far-right cause in the United States. On August 14, 2017, the VA Twitter account announced that Rousseau was no longer affiliated with the group. An aftereffect of Rousseau's feud with Irizarry is his refusal to use any formal title as the Patriot Front leader, rejecting the term "Commander", which had been used by VA. This is despite Rousseau adopting the position of "Vice-Commander" while he was in VA. Patriot Front's core was the "Southern Front", a regional section of the VA, and it was intended from the start to be a more strategic, savvy, careful alternative, adopting American symbols such as red, white, and blue, the bald eagle, and patriotic language. Rousseau has gained notability for being the only major figure in Patriot Front to reveal his identity.

On August 2, 2020, Rousseau and two Patriot Front members disguised as Antifa-affiliated individuals were arrested for placing stickers on and around the county courthouse in Parker County, Texas. All members admitted to the crime.

In 2021, Rousseau attended a conference with Jared Taylor of American Renaissance, a white supremacist website and magazine.

In 2021, Rousseau was the subject of a civil suit by the State of Virginia due to Patriot Front's defacing of a statue of African-American tennis player Arthur Ashe, which Rousseau never challenged, resulting in a default judgment pending for vandalism, should he ever set foot in Virginia again.

In 2023, Rousseau would be named in a lawsuit by African-American singer Charles M. Murrell III for "physical and emotional challenges" stemming from what he claimed was an assault carried out by Patriot Front members during their 2018 march through Boston. Murrell would be represented by Human Rights First, the group that sued the organizers of Unite the Right for violence at their rally.

In 2023, Rousseau and 30 other members of Patriot Front were arrested in Coeur d'Alene, Kootenai County, Idaho, for plotting a riot at a pride parade; however, the charges against Rousseau were dropped mostly due to the length of the case and the fact the prosecution lost evidence as the group's phones had been seized before there was a warrant out for their arrests. Another key reason Rousseau's case was dropped was because his lawyer was able to convince the judge the lead prosecutor was unprofessional, "self-congratulatory", and "braggadocious," while some judges (Note: At any given point, the case against the 31 Patriot Front members had up to nine different judges and the defendants had been tried individually, then as a group, and then individually again.) had ruled the police did not have probable cause for the arrest in the first place. The prosecution handled the case so poorly that one of the judges went on record stating, "I have never, in my 10 years, seen anything that even approaches this level of failure to properly disclose evidence", as the prosecution failed to properly document objections, and fed evidence in "drips and drabs." After the case was dropped, Rousseau held a rally in New York City where he said, "We're going to keep doing demonstrations. We're going to keep making ourselves known."

In a 2024 vandalism case in North Dakota, Rousseau denied that Patriot Front was a far-right or white supremacist organization and claimed that "Patriot Front engages in activism through lawful political activism consistent with its First Amendment right." North Dakota U.S. District Judge Peter Welte dismissed two parts of the lawsuit against Rousseau, which was filed by 10 unnamed individuals for vandalizing an immigrant bus station's mural, rejecting parts of the suit including the plaintiffs' rights to celebrate multiculturalism and diversity, as well as Rousseau's alleged trespassing with intentions to destroy the mural, but kept The Ku Klux Klan Act violations and civil conspiracy allegations on the table.

In February 2024, Rousseau was booked into the McLennan County Jail in Waco, Texas, for a felony charge in Virginia where Rousseau was "burning an object to intimidate"—namely, for carrying a Tiki torch at the Unite the Right rally. The state of Virginia is seeking his extradition as the felony carries the potential sentence of 5 years in prison, while Rousseau and Patriot Front have denounced the charges as fabricated. His extradition would also allow the default judgment for his earlier vandalism case to go through.

== Views ==
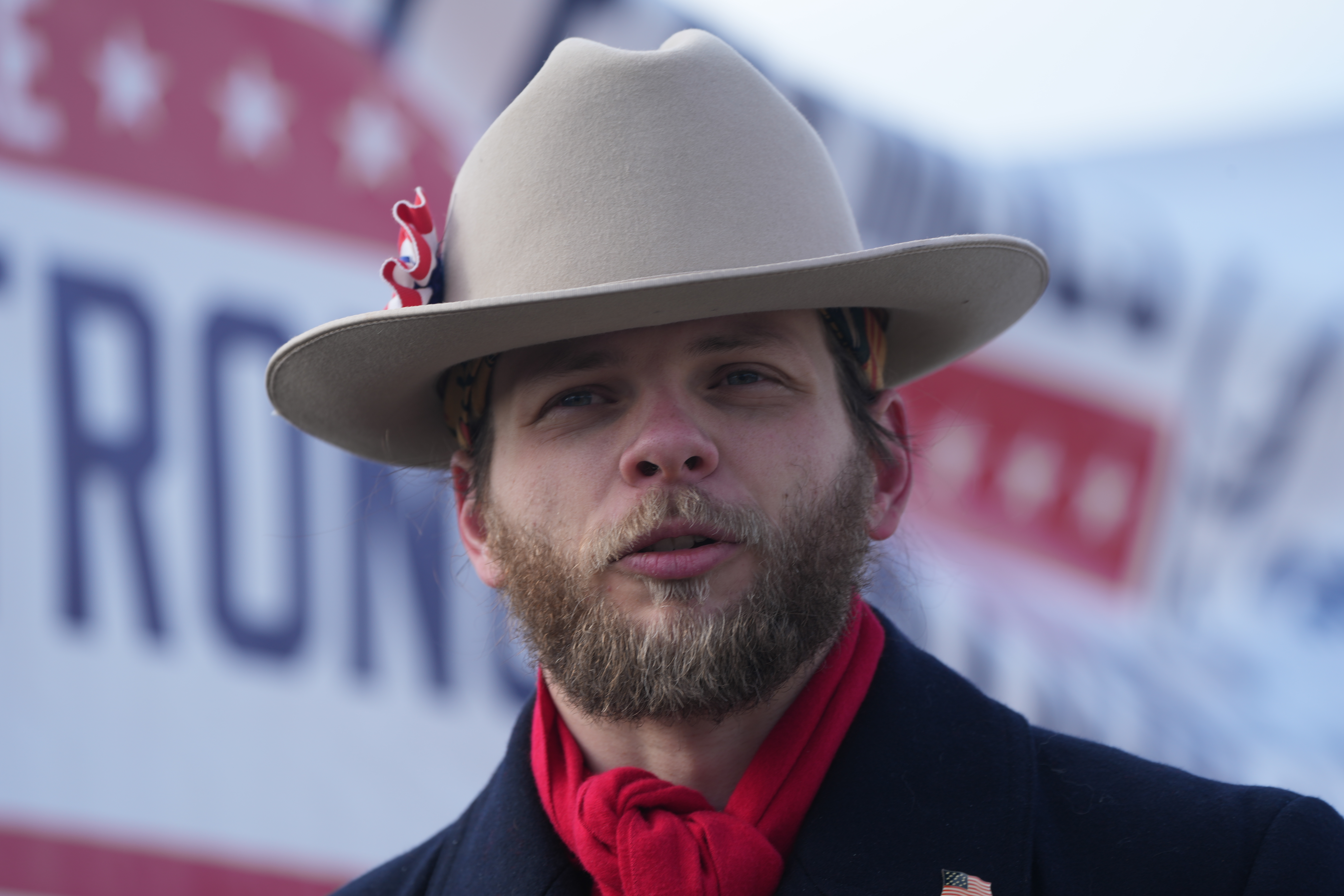
Rousseau at the DC March for Life rally in January 2025

Rousseau believes that Donald Trump is a white supremacist in line with the values of Patriot Front however he only "indirectly supports" people like Rousseau.

Rousseau stated that his group has found it easy to recruit on college campuses and that "colleges are porous, easy to access, full of our target demographic."

Rousseau claims that "[White people are] being relentlessly erased on all sides, by the Jew, by non-whites who hate us."

Rousseau has espoused anti-Zionist views, stating he wants to combat "foreign-influence" in the US government.

Rousseau has frequently denounced calls to violence, even within his own organization, with one Patriot Front infiltrator saying that Rousseau's biggest fear is a member of the group committing an act of terrible violence as that would "end the group." Vanguard America had become "radioactive" due to the Charlottesville car attack being perpetrated by one of its members.

Rousseau is also a strong supporter of anonymity, despite his own openness about his identity, mandating all members of Patriot Front be anonymous and refusing to divulge any details about the group or its inner workings and goals.
