= Bible desecration =

Disrespectful or insulting treatment of Bibles

A Bible desecration is the treatment of the Bible in a way that is intended to be disrespectful or insulting. Bible desecration is considered to be blasphemous and sacrilegious in Christianity.

Such incidences have resulted in legal repercussions, with notable cases occurring in 2007, 2011, 2012, and in 2018. In April 2023, Satanist leaders desecrated the Bible at The Satanic Temple convention in Boston; in the same year, at least four churches were arsoned and Bibles were desecrated in Jaranwala, Pakistan in the month of August.

== Notable instances of desecration ==
=== 2007: Gdynia ===
Adam Darski, on September 3, 2007, tore up a Bible while performing onstage. He was prosecuted by the government of Poland for causing offense to the Catholic Church. He was brought to court in 2010, 2011, and again in 2012 for the Bible desecration; though charges were dropped.

=== 2011: Lahore ===
On April 8, 2011, factory worker Mohammad Akhtar tore up a copy of the Bible at the gate of the Sacred Heart Cathedral in Lahore, Punjab, Pakistan. He was charged with blasphemy and jailed by the Punjab Police. He was forgiven by Church leaders for the Bible desecration.

=== 2012: Cairo ===
In September 2012, Sheikh Ahmed Mohamed Mahmoud Abdallah tore up a copy of the Bible outside the U.S. Embassy in Cairo in Egypt. He underwent a blasphemy trial on October 21, 2012, and the court building was cordoned off due to rioting.

=== 2014: Selangor ===
Three hundred and twenty-one Bibles were stamped with warnings after being seized by authorities from the State of Selangor, causing outrage among Malaysian Christians.

=== 2023: Boston ===
On April 28, 2023, at the SatanCon in Boston, which was held by The Satanic Temple, a Satanic leader desecrated a Bible by ripping pages out of it and then throwing it on the floor while chanting "Hail Satan!".

=== 2023: Jaranwala ===
On August 16, 2023, in the city of Jaranwala, Pakistan, hundreds of Muslims engaged in church arsons and Bible desecrations. These included at least twenty-one churches. According to the BBC, "police appear[ed] to watch on" as this took place.

== See also ==
- Anti-Christian sentiment
- Church arson
- Criticism of the Bible
- Host desecration
- Quran desecration
