= Southern Party =

Former US political party

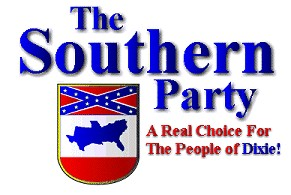
- Founded: August 8, 1999
- Headquarters: Houston, Texas
- Ideology: Southern nationalism Neo-Confederatism; Paleoconservatism; States' rights

Website
- www.thesouthernparty.org (defunct)

The Southern Party (SP) is a minor political party in the United States that operates exclusively in the South. The party supported states' rights and increased Southern cultural and regionalist activism.

The party was formed by the League of the South in 1999 and experienced moderate success following the framing of the Asheville Declaration, which was touted by the party as a second Declaration of Independence. Despite its initial success, the Southern Party was disbanded in 2003 following internal factionalism. However, in 2023, the Southern Party was revived and has been working since such.

== History ==
The merits of a political party representing the regional interests of the Southern United States and border states were first discussed in December 1998 by James Lancaster, George Kalas (both of whom have since renounced and left the Southern movement) and Michael Hill at a League of the South conference held in Monroe, Louisiana. The League authorized the formation of a Southern Party Exploratory Committee (SPEC), which was organized at a later meeting in Tuscaloosa, Alabama, which was held in January 1999. During this meeting Kalas was elected to chair the committee. The Southern Party achieved its first electoral victory on August 22, 2000 when party member Wayne Willingham was elected to the nonpartisan office of Mayor of West Point, Alabama.

The SPEC operated until May 1999, when internal disagreements over ideology and strategy, exacerbated by personal animosities among some members of the committee, led to the fracture of the SPEC into two competing factions. One faction, which continued to operate under the name SPEC, remained loosely affiliated with the League, while the other faction, led by Kalas, Jerry Baxley, and Thomas Reed, among others, formed the Southern National Committee (SNC). Its purpose was to launch the Southern Party as soon as possible. Continued disagreements between the SNC-led faction and the League of the South prompted the SNC to vote for a formal break with the League in May 1999.

While the decision to break with the League was influenced by a number of factors, the leadership of the SNC faction also had become increasingly concerned about the League of the South's apparent unwillingness to purge elements from its ranks that had become more vocal and seemingly more influential within the previous few months before the break.

The SPEC and SNC factions continued to compete for the allegiance of Southern political activists throughout the spring and summer of 1999. While the SPEC faction continued to enjoy the official support of the League of the South, it appeared to gain little political traction as the date of the SNC-sponsored launch of the Asheville Declaration approached.

=== Launch of the Asheville Declaration ===
The highlight of the launch of the Asheville Declaration was the presentation of flags of the Southern states and the reading and signing of the Asheville Declaration, which articulated the SP's paleoconservative founding philosophy.

The National Convention called for state conventions.

In October 1999, the NCSP held a statewide convention in Hillsdale, the first capital of North Carolina, at a colonial inn dating back to before the American Revolution. The chairman was Dr. Douglas Schell, Professor of Management.

There were 78 people in attendance. The Asheville Declaration was adopted by the Convention as well as the State Party Platform. The Convention's theme was "A Second American Revolution." There was statewide media coverage including a 20-minute segment on NC Public TV.

=== Position on secession ===
The party advocated peaceful secession of the Southern States from the American union and the restoration of an independent Southern nation. The party believed this was a real and achievable goal, though they did not know whether it could be achieved in the short-term or in the long-term. In the interim, they believed in working toward a devolution of powers from the Federal Government to state governments.

The Southern Party disbanded around 2002, primarily due to infighting and fractures that developed among the party leaders. A "Southern Parties of the Southwest", operating in Arizona, had 120 members in Arizona and New Mexico. It is not affiliated with the SP organization. However the Southern Parties of the Southwest was disbanded, after the founder and long-time Chairman Charles Goodson was replaced in an election in 2005. Goodson declined to run for re-election citing personal and financial reasons, and claimed that he was not interested anymore in the Chairman seat. After the elections, the party membership decided to merge with the Confederate Party of Arizona, the Southern Parties of the Southwest was dissolved.

=== Factionism ===
Despite its initial media success at Flat Rock, North Carolina, the SP soon squandered its momentum, falling to the same type of internal squabbling that resulted in the earlier rift within SPEC ranks. The rift was sparked by disagreement over a proposed increase in SNC dues for state party organizations. While seemingly a mundane administrative matter, it soon escalated out of control, culminating in a deep and irreconcilable split of the SNC into two factions – one led by party Chairman George Kalas, the other by party Vice-Chairman Jerry Baxley. A protracted power struggle ensued for control of the party's Web site, treasury and state-party organizational affiliations. In December 1999, SNC chairman George Kalas tried to end the bickering by voluntarily resigning his post. The SNC reluctantly accepted the resignation, though voting to recognize Kalas as "Chairman Emeritus" of the Southern Party in recognition of past services. Mike Crane, a Georgia activist and SNC member, whose immediate goal was to head the rift, subsequently was elected interim chairman. Even so, the conflict continued into the early months of 2000, sowing additional disillusionment and leading to a rapid outflow of dues-paying members from the state party organizations.

Realizing that the feud had undermined the party's viability, the Baxley faction finally agreed to a truce proposed by Crane. The factions began negotiating to reunite the SP, successfully concluding these talks in March 2000. New elections also were scheduled to elect a fresh slate of officers to lead the Southern National Committee. However, the subsequent election resulted in the surprise selection of Jerry Baxley by a narrow margin as the new national SNC chairman. Substantial voting irregularities, which, in the view of some, were orchestrated by the Baxley faction, produced additional disaffection within party ranks. This dissatisfaction was further exacerbated by what some viewed as Baxley's abrasive, erratic and unpopular leadership style. The party reunion was short-lived and Baxley soon found himself presiding over a rapidly shrinking party organization as other SNC members resigned and state party organizations began disaffiliating from the SNC as their recognized national party organ. The steady departure of established state party organizations ultimately led to the dissolution of the SNC in 2002.

=== Dissolution ===
In the aftermath of the SNC's collapse, one faction formed the Federation of States and various state-based Southern Independence Parties (SIPs). Two state SPs (Georgia's and North Carolina's) disaffiliated from the SNC and became wholly independent, refusing to recognize any national/regional authority. Some of the other remaining state SPs were, in reality, only "paper parties" led by a few officers and lacking substantial numbers of dues-paying members. These parties soon proved untenable and ultimately collapsed due to their inability to recruit party members and raise operating funds.

=== Reunion ===
In the Spring of 2003 the League of the South attempted to re-establish its influence in the Southern Party by volunteering to serve as an honest broker to coordinate the reunion of all SP supporters (excluding the now-discredited Baxley faction) under one flag. The League invited all anti-Baxley factions of the SP to a meeting in North Carolina for the purpose of realigning all of the invited state parties into a loose confederation with no centralized governing body. This approach was publicly endorsed by all of the original founders of the Southern Party with the exception of the Baxley faction, which was not invited to the meeting. Although the North Carolina meeting marked the end of the SP's internal wars, it did not result in a substantial increase in public interest in the SP. By 2003 the Southern Party had lost credibility with a number of its erstwhile supporters and had squandered what little political capital it had ever had as a result of its seemingly endless internal squabbles.

=== Cause of the factions ===
The widespread factionalism that derailed the Southern Party's seemingly promising prospects has sometimes been characterized by former supporters as the result of a wide-ranging ideological struggle between "centralizers" versus "decentralizers." This was reflected in the public statements of a number of the key Southern Party players after the dissolution of the SNC. Kalas, the principal founder of the SP, was a committed paleoconservative whose interest in Southern heritage and regionalism tended to constitute more a reflection than a foundation of his core beliefs. On the other hand, Lancaster, the author of the Asheville Declaration, was a moderate-conservative Republican in multiple respects who nonetheless harbored strong regionalist sympathies, a fact subsequently reflected in later writings. Mike Crane, who succeeded Kalas for a brief time, was far more the stereotypical Southern nationalist, a longstanding Southern heritage activist and nationalist with strong libertarian convictions. Many others within the SP rank-and-file mirrored these differences.

Still, despite significant differences in political convictions, the major players in the various SP factions nevertheless professed a strong allegiance to the Southern tradition of decentralized government and localized control. The party infighting was actually driven more by personal conflicts between competing party leaders than by genuinely substantive disagreements over party ideology. As one prominent supporter once humorously described the problem: "Organizing Southerners is harder than herding cats!" This factionalist trait was not lost on outside observers, more than one of whom noted the irony that a party advocating secession found itself undone by multiple secessions within its own ranks.

== Aftermath ==
After the party's demise, there was little regionally coordinated political effort – a lack often attributed to a longstanding reluctance among Southern movement activists to empower a "national" coordinating body. Even so, some activity continued at the state level.

Sometime after their departure from the Southern Party and from the League of the South-led Southern movement, Lancaster and Kalas experimented with a concept known as Home Rule for Dixie, the purpose of which was to provide a forum through which a more mainstream, center-right, racially inclusive movement could be developed. A hallmark of this nascent movement was its emphasis on the abandonment of Confederate restorationist symbolism and ideology. For a time, the movement garnered attention and sparked debate within Southern movement ranks. However, the Home Rule concept and Web site were abandoned in 2003 after Lancaster and Kalas concluded that the factionalized Southern movement was beyond repair.

The most successful remnant of the original Southern Party was the Southern Party of Georgia. The Georgia SP fielded multiple candidates for local and state offices in the 2002, 2004, and 2006 elections and was an enduring presence in the statewide political struggle over the redesign of the Georgia State Flag.

The party did not field a presidential candidate, but in 2007 Texan Gene Champman tried to seek the nomination of the Southern Party, the Libertarian Party and the Constitution Party.

== 2023 Reformation ==
In 2023, the Southern Party revamped its platform, with delegates from Kentucky and Tennessee holding a meeting and electing the spokesperson of the Tennessee chapter as the Party's president. Some of the main issues of the rebrand was states rights and support for TEXIT.
