= Michael Hill (activist) =

American political activist

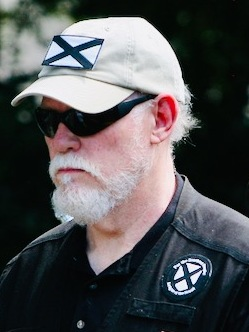
- Hill at the Unite the Right rally in 2017

President of the League of the South
- Incumbent
- Assumed office 1994
- Preceded by: Position established

Personal details
- Born: J. Michael Hill; 1951 (age 74–75) Killen, Alabama, U.S.
- Education: University of Alabama
- Occupation: Political activist and former university professor

Michael Hill (born 1951) is an American political activist and former university professor from Alabama. He is a co-founder and the president of the League of the South, a Neo-Confederate organization whose stated goal is to secede and create an independent country made up of the former states of the Confederate States of America.

== Early life and education ==
Hill was born in 1951 in Killen, Alabama. He studied history at the University of Alabama and obtained his PhD in 1985.

== Career ==
Hill taught British history at University of Alabama and at Stillman College, a historically black college in Tuscaloosa, Alabama, for 18 years until 1998. Building on the views of his mentors at the University of Alabama, he published two books on the Celts, romanticizing the "Celtic" soldier.

In 1994, Hill co-founded the League of the South, a pro-Southern secession organization, with Rev. J. Steven Wilkins of Auburn Avenue Presbyterian Church in Monroe, Louisiana and 39 other Neo-Confederates. The Southern Poverty Law Center considers the League of the South to be a hate group. In 1995, Hill established a chapter of the League of the South on the campus of his alma mater, the University of Alabama. With Thomas Fleming, Hill co-authored an article entitled "New Dixie Manifesto" in The Washington Post in June 1995.

The League of the South venerates what it calls the South's "Celtic" heritage, advocating a version of history in which (white) southerners are alleged to descend from Scottish and Irish immigrants and the "liberal" north is alleged to descend primarily from English immigrants. Michael Hill's speeches make frequent reference to the movie Braveheart, and he often states that a war between the "Celtic" south and the English north is "inevitable". In an Abbeville, South Carolina speech he asked the crowd "What would it take to get you to fight? … What would it take to turn you into a William Wallace?" in reference to the central figure from the movie Braveheart. His supporters also support and glamorize groups like the IRA and the Scottish National Party.

The notion that the South is "Celtic" and the North is "English" has been dismissed by scholars on numerous grounds. It both provides a justification for the civil war that is based on a pseudoscientific racial determinism and which also does not include the southern states explicitly seceding for the sake of preserving slavery. Furthermore it has been pointed out that proponents of the theory define numerous parts of southern and central England as "Celtic", in order to make the numbers work, and it ignores the fact that even amongst the working classes immigrants from Scotland and Ireland were massively outnumbered in the south by English indentured servants by a collective margin of roughly 5:1 (with groups like the Scots-Irish not being the largest immigrant group at this time as Hill and his group claim, but rather they are the largest non-English group) and that in the 1980 census when people were asked what their ancestry or ethnicity was, a large majority of southerners self-identified as being of English ancestry.

Hill tried to revive the Southern Party in 2003. A decade later, in 2013, Hill promoted "opposition to immigration and same-sex marriage".

== Sines v. Kessler ==
In October 2017, Hill was named as a defendant in a case brought by nine Charlottesville residents following the Unite the Right rally in August 2017. The trial was originally scheduled for late 2020, but was postponed due to the COVID-19 pandemic. The trial began on October 25, 2021, and the jury reached a verdict on November 23. Hill was found liable on one count of civil conspiracy under Virginia state law and was ordered to pay $500,000 in damages.

== See also ==
- Lost Cause of the Confederacy
- White Southerners
