= Ian Davison (white supremacist) =

British neo-Nazi

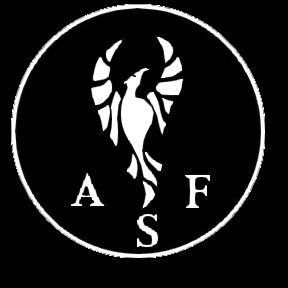
The Rising Phoenix, symbol of the Aryan Strike Force

Ian Davison (born 1967 or 1968) is an English white supremacist and neo-Nazi who was arrested in 2009 for planning terrorist attacks. Davison's son Nicky, a milkman's assistant, then 18 years old, was arrested at the same time.

At the time of his arrest, Davison, then 41, was the leader of a group called the Aryan Strike Force, which held secret training days in Cumbria at which swastika flags were flown. The ASF had an estimated worldwide membership of 350, including members in Germany and Serbia. Police discovered that he had been constructing pipe bombs and purchasing castor beans, which are used to make the poison ricin. According to police investigators, enough ricin was discovered at Davison's Burnopfield residence to kill over 1000 people, while a prosecutor put the number of potential victims at 9. The ricin, which Davison kept in a pickled onion jar, was subsequently transferred to the government's chemical weapons centre. Davison had also reportedly discussed poisoning Muslims' water supplies.

Davison is also antisemitic, writing on an internet forum that "The Jew is the Aryan's sworn enemy above all."

Davison was subsequently sentenced to 10 years in prison, and his son Nicky was given two years' detention. The two reportedly possessed and distributed copies of the bomb-making manuals The Anarchist's Cookbook and The Poor Man's James Bond. The judge in the case expressed surprise that these books were still available for sale on Amazon.com and urged the website to stop selling them.
