= SatanCon =

Annual convention

SatanCon is a convention organized by The Satanic Temple, offering traditional conference-style educational panels alongside social events, arts, and a marketplace focused on Satanism, egalitarianism, social justice, and the separation of church and state.

== Background ==
The Satanic Temple is a non-theistic religious organization founded in 2013. It uses Satanic imagery, humor, and legal tactics to advocate for the separation of church and state, critical thinking, reproductive rights, abolishing corporal punishment in schools, and other causes. It does not believe in a supernatural Satan, but uses the idea of Satan and the public's reaction to the concept as a metaphorical or satirical tool to challenge religious authority and advocate against what it views as injustice.

== History ==
The first SatanCon, with about 300 attendees, took place February 11–13, 2022, at the Saguaro Hotel in Scottsdale, Arizona. The location was chosen based on a 2016 incident in which a member of the Satanic Temple requested to deliver an invocation for the Scottsdale City Council and was denied. The Temple filed a legal challenge alleging religious discrimination, but lost the case and subsequent appeal. The convention was dedicated to the former mayor, Jim Lane, and former councilmember Suzanne Klapp. The convention's theme was "Lupercalia in Scottsdale" and sessions focused on human rights, social justice, and the organization's activities and programs.

The second convention, marking the organization's 10th anniversary, took place April 28–30, 2023, at the Boston Marriott Copley Place in Boston, Massachusetts. It was sold out, drawing about 800 attendees. The location was chosen for similar reasons as the first convention, dedicating it to Boston Mayor Michelle Wu, whom it was suing for religious discrimination. The Temple sued Wu and the City of Boston over their rejection of the organization's request to deliver one of the city council's traditional invocations, a decision the Temple likewise characterized as discrimination. The event used the theme "Hexennacht in Boston". Programming included panels, mixers, a "Satanic Marketplace", and music, combining traditional conference panels with arts and community-oriented social events.

== Protests ==
At the first year's event, hundreds of Christians protested the convention holding crucifixes, crosses, and signs denouncing Satan, although the Satanic Temple does not involve belief in the supernatural Satan. In its second year, the Archdiocese of Boston said it was responding to the event with "intense prayer" and a Christian revival event called Revive Boston was organized in response to SatanCon's "weekend of blasphemy", involving several forms of worship and evangelism. The convention again drew protesters, including a group organized by pastor Greg Locke and a group from the white nationalist organization Patriot Front. Protesters held signs with anti-LGBTQ, anti-abortion, anti-blasphemy, and other messages. Following the convention, the Associated Press reported on viral disinformation spread on social media in the form of AI-generated images depicting children learning about Satanism at SatanCon, where there were no such events.
