= Traditionalist Worker Party =

Defunct neo-Nazi and white nationalist American political party

- Abbreviation: TWP
- Chairman: Matthew Heimbach
- Founded: 2013
- Dissolved: 2018
- Preceded by: Traditionalist Youth Network
- Succeeded by: Patriotic Socialist Front
- Headquarters: Paoli, Indiana
- Ideology: Neo-Nazism; White nationalism; White supremacy; Anti-capitalism; Strasserism
- Political position: Far-right
- Religion: Christian Identity
- Regional affiliation: Nationalist Front (2016–2018)

Party flag

The Traditionalist Worker Party (TWP) was a neo-Nazi political party active in the United States between 2013 and 2018, affiliated with the broader "alt-right" movement that became active within the U.S. during the 2010s. It was considered a hate group by the Southern Poverty Law Center's list.

Established by Matthew Heimbach under the name Traditionalist Youth Network (TYN), the group promoted white separatism and a white supremacist view of Christianity. As a member of the neo-Nazi Nationalist Front, the TWP held a number of protests and other local events. In 2015, the Traditionalist Workers Party changed into a political party so as to run in elections for local office. In April 2018, The Washington Post reported that the TWP had been disbanded the previous month after group leader Matthew Heimbach's arrest for battery. In July 2021, Heimbach announced his intention to reform the party along National Bolshevik lines.

== History ==
=== Traditionalist Youth Network ===
Flag of the Traditionalist Youth Network

The Traditionalist Youth Network was established in May 2013 by Matthew Heimbach and Matt Parrott. Heimbach has been a white supremacist activist since fall 2011, when he formed a group at Towson University in Maryland and invited the white supremacist Jared Taylor to speak at Towson's campus. The following year, Heimbach founded a "White Student Union" on campus, adopting racist and antisemitic views. In spring 2013, upon graduation, Heimbach established the Traditionalist Youth Network in partnership with Parrot, who founded a white supremacist group, Hoosier Nation, in Indiana around 2009. The group eventually became a chapter of American Third Position (later known as the American Freedom Party).

=== Traditionalist Worker Party ===
The Southern Poverty Law Center (SPLC), which tracks extremist groups, has designated the Traditionalist Worker Party as a hate group and has written of Heimbach: "Considered by many to be the face of a new generation of white nationalists... Since graduating in the spring of 2013, he has entrenched himself further in the white nationalist movement and become a regular speaker on the radical-right lecture circuit."

In January 2015 the TYN established the Traditionalist Worker Party (TWP) as its political-party offshoot in preparation for the 2016 elections, and a small group of candidates from the far right announced plans to run under its banner. The party states that it stands against "economic exploitation, federal tyranny, and anti-Christian degeneracy". The group's strategy differs from that of the American Freedom Party (AFP), a different fringe group: while the AFP "has long run presidential candidates with no hope of success" in order to "exploit the election cycle as a way to raise money and generate publicity for their racist positions, TWP actually hopes to win by running for local offices in small communities."

One element that separated the Traditionalist Worker Party from many other far-right organizations was its anti-capitalist positions "denouncing corporate interests and environmental degradation, endorsing worker unions and [supporting] nationalization of key industries." Heimbach and other Traditionalist Worker Party leaders publicly supported organizations and such as the Nation of Islam, Hezbollah, and the governments of Bashar al-Assad, North Korea, the Russian Federation, and China, stating that "Our policy is, if you're a group that's dedicated to a political revolution through peaceful, legal and honorable means, then you're someone we can work with...They want independence for their communities; they want self-determination. [That's something] all nationalists can stand by." The Traditionalist Worker Party endorsed the creation of a "Traditionalist International" so that nationalist organizations, under Russian leadership, could work to advance their far-right, separatist, and often homophobic and anti-semitic beliefs in global politics.

The organization focused its attention on developing chapters in impoverished areas through charity events, following the model by the Greek fascist party Golden Dawn, and putting forward a message that "these are people that the establishment doesn't care about" and working to provide a political voice for.

=== Nationalist Front ===
On April 22, 2016, the Traditionalist Worker Party formed a coalition with several other organizations called the Aryan Nationalist Alliance. The Aryan Nationalist Alliance later changed its name to Nationalist Front. Its aim was to unite white supremacist, neo-Confederate, and white nationalist groups under a common umbrella. The coalition was joined by the neo-Nazi National Socialist Movement (NSM), neo-confederate League of the South, the neo-Nazi Vanguard America, and four other groups.

In April 2017, the group organized the white supremacist rally in Pikeville, Kentucky which attracted 125 to 150 supporters. In August 2017, the affiliated groups participated in the Unite the Right rally in Charlottesville, Virginia. In October 2017, the Nationalist Front was a key organizer of the "White Lives Matter" rally in Shelbyville and Murfreesboro, Tennessee. Participating groups included: NSM, TWP, League of the South, Vanguard America, The Right Stuff, and Anti-Communist Action.

=== Internal conflict and disbandment ===
On March 13, 2018, Heimbach was arrested in Paoli, Indiana, on charges of domestic battery arising from a domestic dispute. Following this, Parrott shut down the TWP's websites and said he planned to delete membership data, citing privacy concerns. According to Parrott, the TWP no longer existed, as the incident had destroyed the group's credibility. Days later, however, Parrott filed a sworn declaration in court (in an ongoing federal civil lawsuit over the Unite the Right rally in 2017), stating that he had not deleted or destroyed the membership information, as it was relevant to the ongoing litigation.

On April 5, 2018, the left-wing media collective Unicorn Riot released hundreds of thousands of messages on TWP's Discord server and associated ones such as "Silver Guild" and "Not Tradworker" as part of a series on alt-right and neo-Nazi organizations. The messages on TWP's Discord server revealed that the group promoted and praised Dylann Roof, the perpetrator of the Charleston church shooting at Emanuel African Methodist Episcopal Church in Charleston, South Carolina as well as James Alex Fields, the man behind the Charlottesville car attack during the violent Unite the Right rally in Charlottesville, Virginia. The group also praised Jacob Scott Goodwin, a member of the group that was involved in the beating of DeAndre Harris in the parking lot during that rally. Additionally, there was a conflict within TWP over one of its members, Colton Williams, taking issue with another member having a non-white spouse. These conversations also included the group's ties to Atomwaffen Division, a violent neo-Nazi terrorist network linked to 5 murders such as the death of Blaze Bernstein of which Mark "Illegal Aryan" Daniel Reardon and Vasilios "VasilistheGreek" Pistolis were members of both organizations. Despite his group having been involved in violent incidents as well, Heimbach expressed concern over Atomwaffen's level of extremism and influence and eventually denounced it.

== Ideology ==
Alternative flag of the Traditionalist Worker Party

Heimbach and his group advocated white separatism, and the group also adhered to a white nationalist and white supremacist ideology. Heimbach and Parrott are "self-declared ethnonationalists" who aim to create a separate white ethnostate. Specifically, the group promoted a white supremacist interpretation of Christianity, recruiting members to battle what it terms "anti-Christian degeneracy." The group advocated the prohibition of abortion, restrictions on immigration, and the carrying out of what Heimbach calls "peaceful secessionist projects." In media reports, Heimbach has been called an "alt-right personality".

The SPLC describes the group's ideology as being "virulently racist and anti-Semitic." The SPLC and the Anti-Defamation League both note that the group is modeled after the European Identitarian movement. The TWP proclaims itself to be "against modernism, individualism, globalism and Marxism." The group identifies itself as an anti-capitalist organization and it connects this position to its advocacy of nationalism by stating "For us, to be anti-capitalist is to be a nationalist. Nationalism is a bulwark against capitalist exploitation and globalism."

The Traditionalist Worker Party rejected multiracial societies and the concept of civic nationalism, instead, it believed that "The ethnic community is the definition of a true nation. Shared blood, history, and traditions are what make a people and bind us together as an extended family." The rejection of multiculturalism as organizational policy is a continuation of the group's virulent white separatist beliefs.

In 2016, Heimbach hailed the British vote to leave the European Union as "the greatest European nationalist victory since 1933," the year of the Nazi rise to power in Germany. In 2016, the TWP and the Barnes Review, a Holocaust denial publication, announced a partnership to promote each other.

== Organization and activities ==
Traditionalist Youth Networks's only active university chapter is at the Indiana University Bloomington; this group is led by a white-supremacist activist Thomas Buhls, who has been affiliated with the Harrison, Arkansas-based Knights Party, a Ku Klux Klan group. In December 2016, the group's founder Heimbach claimed that it had some three dozen active chapters and 500 members across the United States; analysts at the Southern Poverty Law Center and Anti-Defamation League state that these numbers are likely exaggerated. The SPLC's 2017 annual report identifies the TWP as having chapters in Paoli and Bloomington, Indiana; Benson, North Carolina, and Wisconsin, and the affiliated Traditionalist Worker Party as having chapters in Paoli and Columbus, Indiana; Sacramento, California; Louisville, Madisonville, and Murray, Kentucky; Kansas; Philadelphia, Pennsylvania; Dallas, Texas; and Virginia.

In August 2013, the group protested a leftist bookstore in Bloomington, Indiana; in October 2013, the group held rallies protesting campus speeches by anti-racist educator Tim Wise.

In September 2013, the group, as Traditionalist Youth Network, held an event in Corunna, Michigan, in support of Syrian president Bashar al-Assad's government. The group initially planned a "Koran BBQ" that would feature the burning of copies of the Qur'an and pictures of Muhammad, to show "Islamic immigrants and citizens alike that they are not welcome here in Michigan"; however, this was changed to a pro-Assad protest after the U.S. government announced its plans to support Syrian rebels. Heimbach told MLive that he did not regret the group's original plan, and that the group supported Islam "when it's in its own home in the Middle East."

In 2014, the group filed an amicus brief in a federal court in Michigan in the case of DeBoer v. Snyder. In its brief, the group took a stance against same-sex marriage, which Parrott described as part of "the Leftists [sic] social engineering campaign to destroy every last vestige of Western civilization." Later the same year, the group filed a second amicus brief in a case in Maryland challenging a law prohibiting assault weapons; in a four-page filing, the TYN stated that it opposed "the enemy of freedom—the Culture Distorter—in its sights and wishes to shoot down unconstitutional legislation that disarms our people".

In July 2015, the group called for the filing of hate-crime charges in connection with the beating of a white man in Fountain Square, Cincinnati. The local prosecutor, Hamilton County Prosecutor Joe Deters, stated that there was no evidence of ethnic intimidation in the crime.

At a March 2016, Donald Trump rally at the Kentucky International Convention Center in Louisville, Heimbach was filmed shoving a black woman who was protesting Trump. Heimbach and two other men were initially charged with misdemeanor harassment with physical contact and were served with a criminal summons in April 2017. The charge was later amended to second-degree disorderly conduct; in June 2017, Heimbach entered an Alford plea, a form of guilty plea. Heimbach was fined $145, was ordered to attend anger management classes, and was sentenced to 90 days in jail; the jail sentence was suspended on the condition that Heimbach not commit another crime within two years. In 2018, after Heimbach was charged with misdemeanor battery and felony domestic battery in Indiana in a separate case, Heimbach's probation in the Kentucky case was revoked and he was sent to jail for 38 days.

In a separate civil case, Heimbach is being sued in federal court for assault and battery by the woman he accosted at the March 2016 rally, Kashiya Nwanguma, and two of her fellow protesters, Henry Brousseau and Molly Shah, who allege that they were also the victims of violence at the rally. Also named as defendants are Alvin Bamberger (who is accused of assault and battery) and Donald Trump and Trump's campaign (who are accused of incitement to riot, negligence, and vicarious liability). In the case, Heimbach, who is representing himself, said that he "relied on Trump's authority" in order to oust the woman from the rally, citing Trump's directive to "Get 'em out of here" and promise to "pay for the legal fees" of supporters who expelled dissidents from rallies. On this basis, Heimbach has filed court papers seeking indemnity from Trump.

In November 2017, the group created an online crowdfunding platform called "GoyFundMe" for racists, white supremacists, and other extremists with the objective of advancing their causes. The name is a play on the name of the GoFundMe crowdfunding platform, founded in 2010, and the word goy.

Twitter suspended the account of Matt Heimbach on January 3, 2017. The account for the group itself was suspended from Twitter on December 18, 2017.

== See also ==
- 2016 Sacramento riot
