= Aryan Strikeforce =

Neo-Nazi white supremacist group

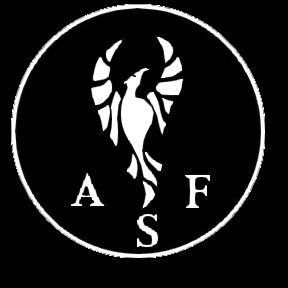
- Founder: Ian Davison
- Country: United Kingdom
- Ideology: Neo-Nazism; White Supremacy; Antisemitism

Aryan Strikeforce (ASF) is a neo-Nazi white supremacist group. Established in the United Kingdom by white supremacist Ian Davison, ASF was estimated to have 350 members online in 2010. It was designated as a terrorist organisation by Canada in 2021.

According to the Southern Poverty Law Center, ASF is linked to the neo-Nazi terrorist group Combat 18, itself an offshoot of Blood & Honour, which was founded in the U.K. in the early 1990s.

== United Kingdom ==
English white supremacist Ian Davison founded the group in the United Kingdom. The Guardian reported in 2010 that the group had around 350 members online.

In December 2009, two men who were said to be "administrators" of the group's website appeared in the City of Westminster Magistrates' Court in London accused of inciting racial hatred, after they used the website to post antisemitic content encouraging others to kill Jews.

In April 2010, Davison's son, Nicky, of county Durham, England, joined the group to please his father and was later convicted on three charges of terrorism. The Guardian reported that he had used the group's website to threaten to overthrow the "Zionist Occupied Government".

== United States ==
Joshua Michael Steever of New Jersey, U.S., founded the U.S. chapter in 2013 after he was ousted from Aryan Terror Brigade, another white supremacist group.

A man associated with the group since 2014, Cameron Anthony, was arrested in June 2017 after threatening a Latino man with a baseball bat, while shouting "White power!", at a rally in Harrisburg, Pennsylvania. Eight months before his arrest, at least eight people have been arrested on varying charges, including money laundering and illegal weapons possession, including an October 2016 arrest of Ronald Pulcher II, from Galeton, Pennsylvania, who was ASF's self-described "Vinland Division President".

Around 2018, 4 members pleaded guilty, one of which was vice president Steven D. Davis. Davis pleaded guilty at the U.S. Middle District Court in Pennsylvania for his involvement in a scheme to transport weapons and drugs over state lines. The other members, Henry Lambert Baird, Joshua Michael Steever and Connor Drew Dikes, were all involved of transporting crystal meth and weapons from Pennsylvania to Maryland.

Also in 2018, the National Socialist Movement and ASF held a "white unity meeting" in Ulysses, Pennsylvania, to discuss their response to Donald Trump's presidency and plan joint action.

== Canada ==
ASF and other far-right groups and figures active in Canada were banned from having a presence on Facebook in 2019, following criticism of the platform for its refusal to remove a post by white nationalist Faith Goldy. The group was designated as a terrorist organisation by the Canadian government following the January 6 United States Capitol attack in 2021.
