= League of the South =

American white supremacist organization

Southern Nationalist League
- Abbreviation: LS
- Formation: 1994; 32 years ago
- Type: Non-governmental organization, Separatist group
- Legal status: Active
- Purpose: Creation of a neo-Confederate white Southern nation, based on Protestant Christianity.
- Headquarters: Killen, Alabama
- Location: United States
- Region served: Southern United States
- Fields: Politics
- President: Michael Hill
- Key people: Thomas Fleming, Michael Peroutka, Brad "Hunter Wallace" Griffin, Clyde N. Wilson, Isaac Baker, Michael Tubbs, Michael "Palmetto Patriot" Cushman Thomas Woods
- Subsidiaries: The Free Magnolia (magazine)
- Website: southernatleague.com
- Formerly called: League of the South

The Southern Nationalist League, formerly known as League of the South (LS), is an American white nationalist, neo-Confederate, white supremacist organization that says its goal is "a free and independent Southern republic".

Headquartered in Killen, Alabama, the group advocates for the reestablishment of the Confederate States of America, comprising Alabama, Arkansas, Florida, Georgia, Louisiana, Mississippi, the Carolinas (North and South Carolina), Texas, Tennessee, and Virginia, with the additional states of Oklahoma, Missouri, Kentucky, and Maryland also being included, despite not being a part of the historical confederacy. It claims to also be a religious and social movement, advocating a return to a more traditionally conservative, Christian-oriented Southern culture.

The movement and its members are allied with the alt-right. The group was part of the neo-Nazi Nationalist Front formerly, alongside the National Socialist Movement (NSM), the now-defunct Traditionalist Workers Party (TWP) and Vanguard America (VA, since rebranded as Patriot Front). The group helped organize the Pikeville rally in Pikeville, Kentucky; the Unite the Right rally in Charlottesville, Virginia; and the White Lives Matter rally in Shelbyville, Tennessee. The Southern Poverty Law Center has designated it as a hate group.

== History ==
The organization was formed in 1994 by Michael Hill and others, including attorney Jack Kershaw and Libertarian historian Thomas Woods. The League of the South was named in reference to the League of United Southerners, a group organized in 1858 to shape Southern public opinion and the Lega Nord (Northern League), a successful populist movement in Northern Italy from which the group took inspiration.

The League's first meeting included 40 men, 28 of whom formed The Southern League. Two years later, they changed the name to The League of the South to avoid confusion with the Southern League of Minor League Baseball. Among the early members were Southern professors, including its president Michael Hill, a British history professor and specialist in Celtic history at Stillman College, a historically black school in Tuscaloosa. Hill has since left his teaching position.

In 2000, the group supported Pat Buchanan and the Reform Party.

In time, the group's views became more extreme; by 2004, founding members Grady McWhiney and Forrest McDonald had denounced Hill's leadership and left the organization.

Since 2007, The League's main publication has been The Free Magnolia, a quarterly tabloid.

== Views ==
League of the South saltire flag nicknamed "The Cushman Flag" and "The Southern Nationalist Flag"

The League has been described as using "Celtic" mythology "belligerently against what is perceived as a politically correct celebration of multicultural Southern diversity".

The group believes that the Southern United States should be an independent country ruled by white men.

In 2001, they asked the U.S. Congress to pay $5 billion in reparations for "property" (including enslaved human beings) taken or destroyed by Union forces during the Civil War. The group's legal counsel Jack Kershaw said their proposal included paying reparations to African Americans due to the supposed negative effect the end of slavery had on their ancestors: "Blacks were better off in antebellum times in the South than they were anywhere else. [...] They lost a lot too when that lifestyle was destroyed."

=== Culture ===
The League defines Southern culture as profoundly Christian and anti-abortion. The League describes Southern Culture as being inherently Anglo-Celtic in nature (originating in the British Isles), and they believe the South's core Anglo-Celtic culture should be preserved.

According to the League, the South has had a Marxist and egalitarian society "impressed upon it". The League's Core Beliefs Statement advocates the stigmatization of "perversity and all that seeks to undermine marriage and the family."

=== Politics ===
The League believes that what it calls "the Southern people" have the right to secede from the United States, and that they "must throw off the yoke of imperial [federal, or central government] oppression". The League promotes a Southern Confederation of sovereign, independent States. The League favors strictly limited immigration, opposes standing armies and any regulation whatsoever of firearms. This proposed independent nation is described by League publications as part of a process to convince "the Southern people" that they have a unique identity.

The League focuses on recruiting and encouraging "cultural secession". In November 2006 its representatives attended the First North American Secessionist Convention of secessionists from different parts of the country. In October 2007 it co-hosted the Second North American Secessionist Convention in Chattanooga, Tennessee.

In 2015, the group announced it would be holding an event celebrating the assassination of Abraham Lincoln, while honoring John Wilkes Booth as a hero. On April 11, 2015, it was organized by the vice chairman of the Maryland-Virginia chapter of the League, Shane Long. The LOS's main Facebook page put it bluntly: "Join us in April to celebrate the great accomplishment of John Wilkes Booth. He knew a man who needed killing when he saw him!"

The League has attempted to form paramilitary groups on more than one occasion.

The League of the South is opposed to fiat currency, personal income taxation, central banking, property taxes and most state regulation of business. The League supports sales taxes and user fees.

== Designation as hate group ==
In the summer of 2000, the Southern Poverty Law Center (SPLC) designated the League of the South as a hate group, citing the group's "academic veneer" of revisionist history and calls for secession. Hill dismissed the designation as politically motivated.

According to the Anti-Defamation League (ADL), the League of the South is a white supremacist group which promotes racism and anti-Semitism through events held with other white supremacist groups. The League of the South joined the Nationalist Front, a loose coalition of neo-Nazis and other white supremacists, in 2017.

== Members ==
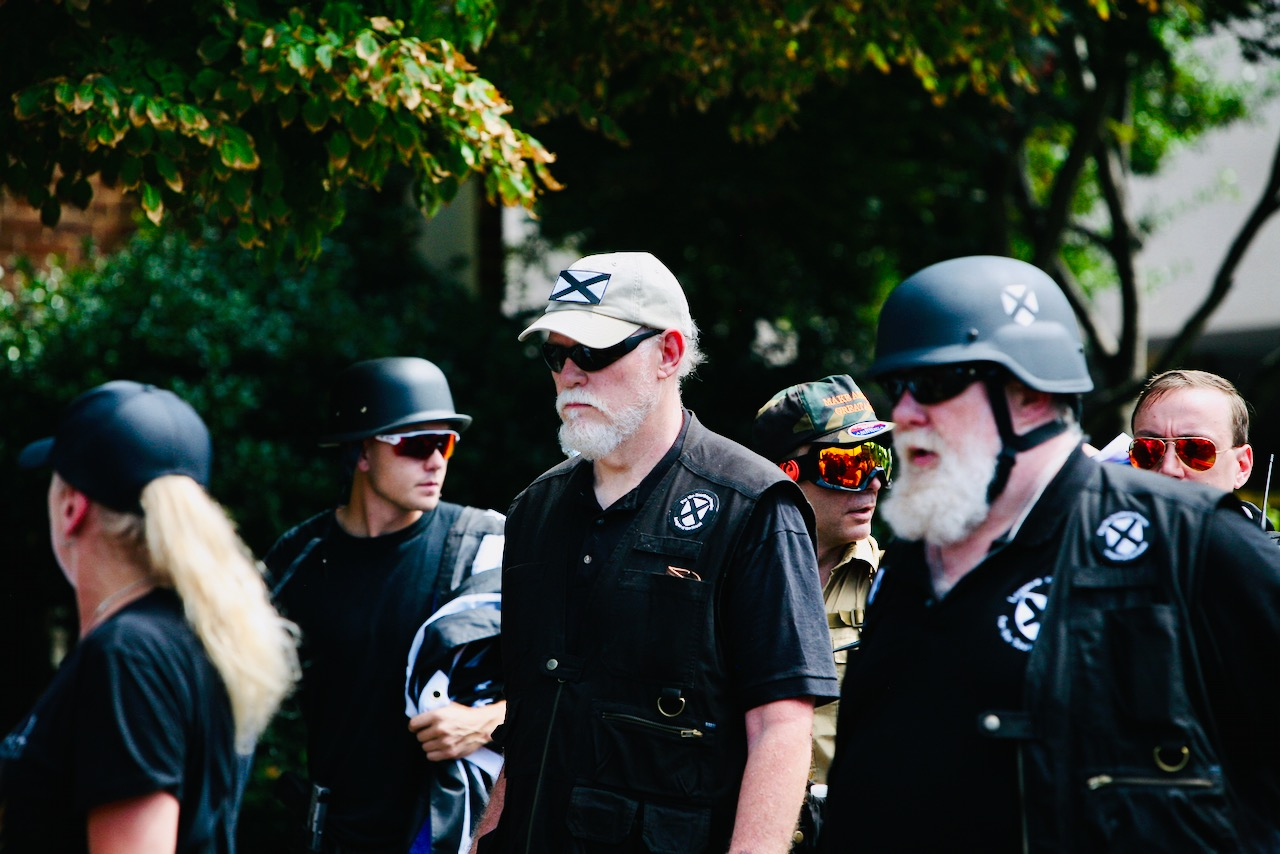
Michael Hill Ike Baker (center) and Jeffrey Clark (right) at the Unite the Right rally in 2017

The League's board of directors is composed of Michael Hill, Mark Thomey, Mike Crane, Sam Nelson, and John Cook. Among the founding members were Thomas Fleming, Thomas Woods, Grady McWhiney, Clyde Wilson, and Forrest McDonald.

== See also ==
- Alt-right
- Antisemitism in the United States
- Dixiecrat
- List of active separatist movements in North America
- List of organizations designated by the Southern Poverty Law Center as hate groups
- Nationalist Front (United States)
- White nationalism
