= Patriot Front =

American white supremacist group

- Logo

- Flag
- Predecessor: Vanguard America
- Formation: August 2017; 9 years ago
- Founder: Thomas Rousseau
- Type: White supremacy; Neo-fascism
- Location: United States
- Members: 540 (2026)
- Leader: Thomas Rousseau
- Affiliations: The Daily Stormer; Rise Above Movement; National Justice Party
- Website: patriotfront.us

Patriot Front is an American white supremacist group. Part of the broader alt-right movement, the group split off from the neo-Nazi organization Vanguard America in the aftermath of the Unite the Right rally in 2017.

Patriot Front's aesthetic combines traditional Americana with fascist symbolism. Internal documents leaked to USA Today indicated it had approximately 540 members as of 2026. According to the Anti-Defamation League, the group generated 82% of reported incidents in 2021 involving distribution of racist, antisemitic, and other similar propaganda in the United States, comprising 3,992 incidents, in every continental state.

== History and beliefs ==
Patriot Front is led by Thomas Ryan Rousseau, who was a teenager when he founded the group. In 2017, Rousseau took control of Vanguard America's web and Discord server several weeks before the Unite the Right rally in Charlottesville, Virginia, in which he participated as the leader of Vanguard America's contingent. Following the bad press arising from the rally, Rousseau rebranded Vanguard America as Patriot Front, writing in a Discord message "Vanguard America, as you know it, will now be the 'Patriots Front'", and that the focus and goals of the group would remain the same. Rousseau has been arrested repeatedly in connection with the group's activities.

As with Vanguard America, Patriot Front supports a version of white-centered ideology compatible with the views of fascists across America, such as closed borders and authoritarian government. According to the Anti-Defamation League (ADL), "Patriot Front is a white supremacist group whose members maintain that their ancestors conquered America and bequeathed it to them, and no one else."

The group uses patriotic imagery to broaden its appeal while adding symbols such as the fasces, a symbol of fascism. It uses attention-grabbing techniques, such as igniting smoke bombs during demonstrations and protests. According to the Southern Poverty Law Center (SPLC), "Patriot Front focuses on theatrical rhetoric and activism that can be easily distributed as propaganda for its chapters across the country." The group published a manifesto which contained passages including:

Those of foreign birth may occupy civil status within the lands occupied by the state, and they may even be dutiful citizens, yet they may not be American. Membership within the American nation is inherited through blood, not ink. Even those born in America may yet be foreign...Nationhood cannot be bestowed upon those who are not of the founding stock of our people, and those who do not share the common spirit that permeates our greater civilization, and the European diaspora...In order to survive as a culture, a heritage, and a way of being, our nation must learn that its collective interests are fighting against its collective threats of replacement and enslavement...The damage done to this nation and its people will not be fixed if every issue requires the approval and blessing from the dysfunctional American democratic system. Democracy has failed in this once great nation.

The group has been accused of antisemitism and held controversial signs reading "No Zionists in Government". Rousseau has stated they want to combat "foreign influences" in the US government.

The group's members consist of eight regional networks, and its recruitment is primarily done online. The group avoids talking about guns or violence online as a policy.

In December 2019, former Patriot Front Northeast regional director Christopher Hood founded the National Social Club (NSC-131) after being expelled from the organization. NSC-131 subsequently developed into an independent neo-Nazi organization primarily active in New England.

A 2019 investigation by ProPublica estimated the group had about 300 members; in leaked chats at the end of 2021, Rousseau complained about a "220's to 230's membership rut". According to the SPLC, as of 2021 Patriot Front was arguably the leading white supremacist group in the country, and the most active in using flyers for recruitment. According to ProPublica, Rousseau and others in the group "delight in seeing their actions reflected in the SPLC's nationwide map recording acts of hate and in the media".

== Activities and events ==
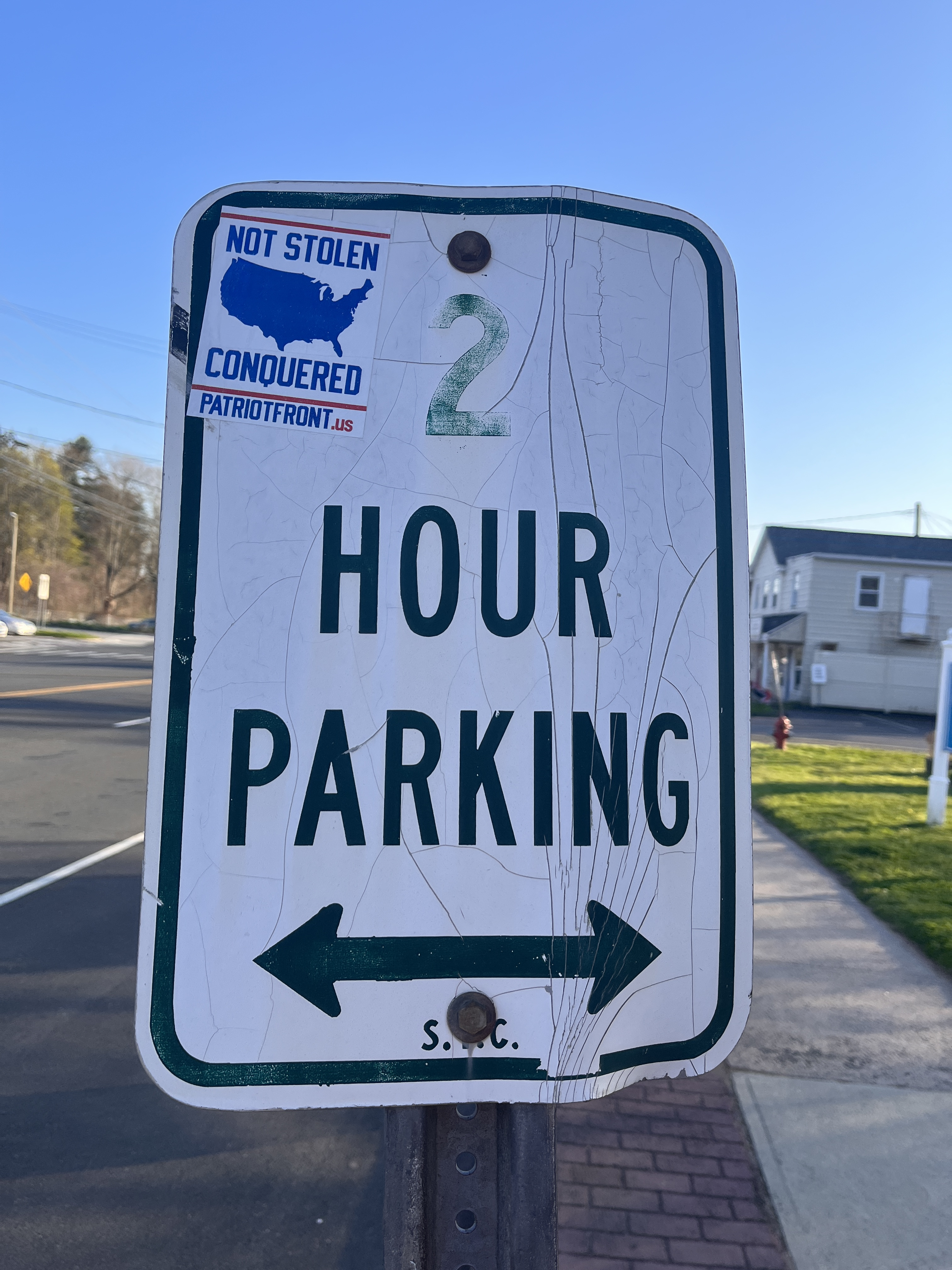
A sticker from the Patriot Front on a road sign in Portland, Connecticut

Patriot Front's demonstrations, literature, and sometimes acts of service are "tightly choreographed and scripted to maximize propaganda value", according to the SPLC. The ADL estimated that Patriot Front generated 82% of reported incidents of distributing racist, antisemitic and other hateful propaganda in the U.S. during 2021, and 80% in 2020. According to leaked chats made public in January 2022, Patriot Front members are required to deface racial justice murals in their areas.

=== 2018 ===
On July 28, members of Patriot Front marched on an Occupy ICE protest in San Antonio, Texas, and filmed themselves vandalizing protestors' tents and signs.

=== 2019 ===
On February 13, hundreds of racist and anti-immigrant signs and flyers were taped up in the East Boston section of Boston, Massachusetts, an area with many immigrants. Patriot Front claimed responsibility. Boston mayor Marty Walsh denounced the incident. On February 15, Boston police arrested three Patriot Front members; two faced charges of carrying weapons, and one was charged with assault on a police officer after allegedly slapping an officer's hand.

=== 2020 ===
On February 8, about 100 Patriot Front members marched in Washington, D.C., along the National Mall from the Lincoln Memorial to the United States Capitol grounds, and then headed north to a Walmart near Washington Union Station. The marchers wore khakis, matching dark blue jackets, hats, all-white face masks, and dark sunglasses, and carried Patriot Front and Betsy Ross flags.

In August, during protests and counter-protests in Weatherford, Texas, over a Confederate statue, police arrested three men, including Rousseau, who had plastered stickers on signs, parks, and property. They were charged with criminal mischief, jailed on a $500 bond, and released.

=== 2021 ===
On January 29, a group of men wearing khaki pants, matching blue jackets with patches, and white face masks marched on the National Mall toward the US Capitol carrying flags with Patriot Front symbolism.

On February 28, seven members of the Patriot Front, including Rousseau, were involved in a car crash. One member of the group died, and Rousseau was seriously injured, requiring emergency surgery. The Utah Department of Public Safety determined that the Patriot Front's vehicle was speeding at the time of the crash.

On July 10, two members were arrested for vandalism after being accused of spray-painting graffiti in Salem, Massachusetts.

On December 4, more than 100 members of Patriot Front held a rally in downtown Washington, D.C., chanting "reclaim America", carrying flags and plastic shields and wearing uniforms consisting of white gaiters, sunglasses, blue jackets, khaki pants, brown boots and hats. Some wore plastic shin guards.

=== 2022 ===
In January, members of Patriot Front were seen at the 2022 March for Life anti-abortion rally in Washington, D.C.

On June 11, police arrested 31 members of Patriot Front whom they stopped inside a U-Haul truck near an LGBT Pride event in Coeur d'Alene, Idaho. They were charged with conspiracy to riot. Rousseau was one of the members arrested. An anonymous caller tipped off police when they saw the group of men climbing into a U-Haul after retrieving shields from the back of a truck. The Kootenai County Sheriff's Office released the mugshots and names of all 31 arrested, who were from at least 11 states. After the arrests, the Coeur d'Alene police chief said the police department received death and doxing threats. By June 13, all 31 members were released on bail. Court documents stated police had recovered a typed document that detailed the group's goal and planning for the day. As of February 2023, one member had pleaded guilty to conspiracy to riot (he was fined $500 and sentenced to two years of unsupervised probation), three members failed to appear and thus had bench warrants issued, and various others had jury trials scheduled. Rousseau was granted a continuance, with his pre-trial appearance moved from May to September 2023. Five group members were convicted of misdemeanor conspiracy to riot on July 20, 2023, and the next day sentenced to five days in jail, credited for two days already served, plus $1,000 fines and one year of probation. Rousseau's case was dismissed in November 2024. The presiding judge, Judge John Cafferty, was quoted in the Idaho Capital Sun: "This is an important case. It should not be dismissed lightly," and cited loss of evidence and delays among the reasons behind the dismissal.

On July 2, about 100 masked members with shields and a banner marched through Boston, with stops at the Boston Public Library and Old State House building. Police said one man was injured in a confrontation with Patriot Front members. This incident led to a lawsuit which resulted in a federal judge ordering the group to pay damages of over $2.7 million in January 2025.

=== 2023 ===
In April, the group protested at the "SatanCon" event of The Satanic Temple, held in Boston. In May, the group marched at the National Mall in Washington, D.C.

Five members of the group filed a federal lawsuit in June against an alleged leftist activist they said had infiltrated the group and publicly disclosed their identities—the plaintiffs alleged they lost jobs, incomes and family relationships as a result. Two members had been arrested in connection with the 2022 conspiracy to riot at a Pride event in Coeur d'Alene; one was subsequently convicted and sentenced for his role.

=== 2024 ===
On April 27 in Charleston, West Virginia, about 100 Patriot Front members exited U-Haul trucks in Daniel Boone Park and marched to the Capitol building in front of the statue of Stonewall Jackson located on Kanawha Boulevard and California Street. The group carried numerous Patriot Front flags and a banner, and members chanted and attempted to hand out propaganda fliers. They wore white masks to obscure their faces, khaki pants, dark blue polo shirts, and hats. Many included sunglasses with their uniforms. The Charleston Police Department remained close by to ensure the people of Charleston's safety, and the march ended without incident. This demonstration happened on the same day that YWCA Charleston hosted a Race to End Racism event. Charleston's mayor, Amy Shuler Goodwin, responded to the unexpected demonstration by noting, "It is important for our community to celebrate coming together and stand up against hate. When our city team learned of a national hate group demonstrating earlier today, we acted quickly and appropriately to make sure all in our community remained safe."

In July, Patriot Front, the Goyim Defense League, and other white supremacist, antisemitic, and neo-Nazi organizations handed out flyers, asked passersby if they were Jewish, and disrupted a city council meeting in Nashville, Tennessee, waving large Confederate flags. In response, the Jewish Federation of Greater Nashville organized a peace rally, drawing about 400 participants.

=== 2025 ===
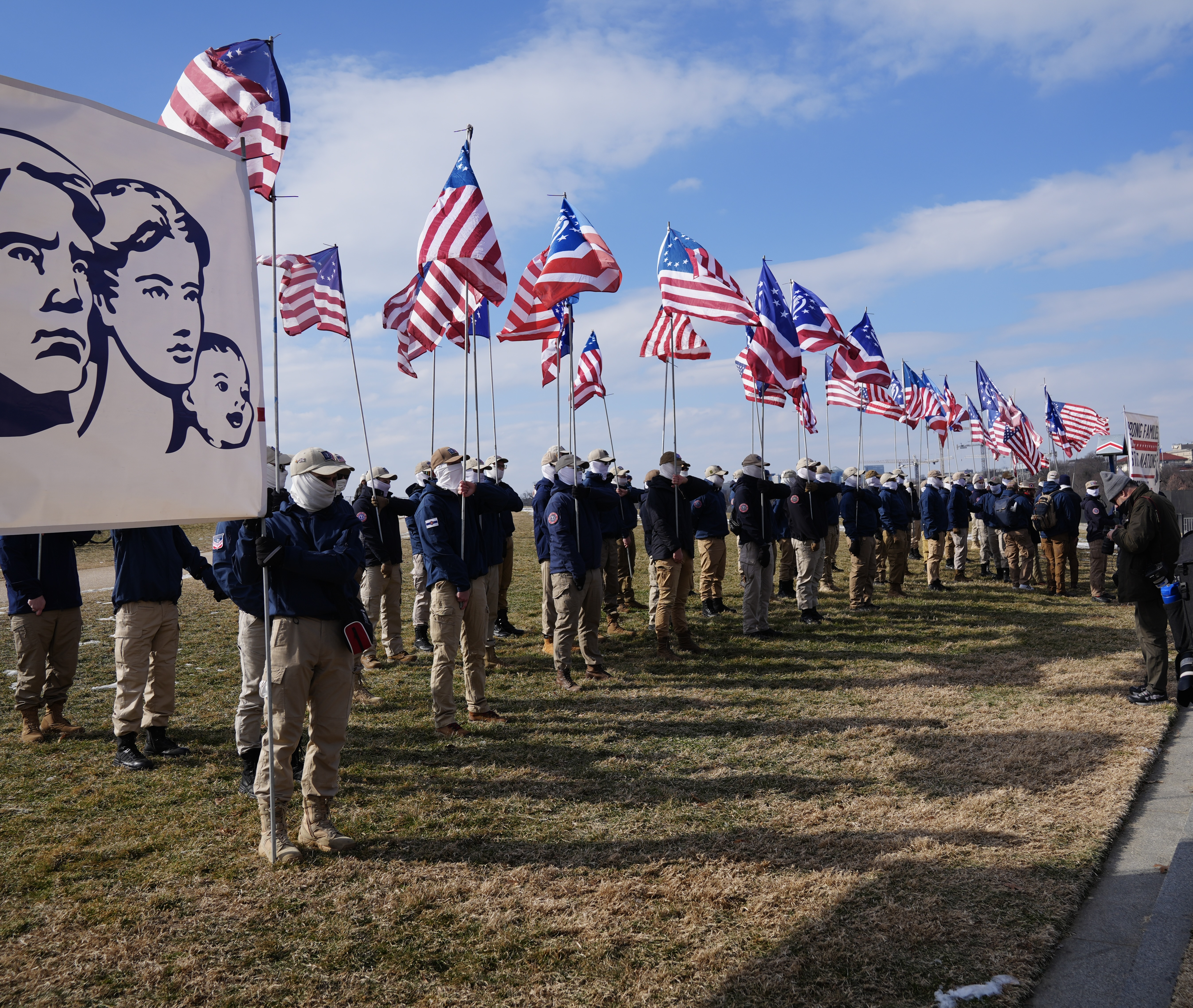
Members of the group in January 2025

On January 13, a federal judge ordered Patriot Front to pay approximately $2.7 million ($755,000 in damages and $2 million in punitive damages) to Charles M. Murrel III for violating his civil rights. The group was alleged to have attacked Murrel, a black man, on July 2, 2022, during a march by the group in Boston. No individual was charged in relation to the incident.

On January 24, the Patriot Front marched next to the annual March for Life anti-abortion rally in Washington, D.C. On February 22, about a dozen Patriot Front members rallied near the Massachusetts State House in Boston, apparently as a counter-protest to a group that was protesting police brutality.

Following the flash flooding at Camp Mystic and surrounding areas in early July, the Patriot Front claimed it was participating in disaster relief efforts and distributing aid to survivors. In a video posted to the group’s official Telegram channel, Rousseau stated they were "in central Texas, responding to the flooding, which has destroyed communities and taken the lives of scores of Americans." He stated they were prioritizing "European peoples" when determining who would receive aid.

=== 2026 ===
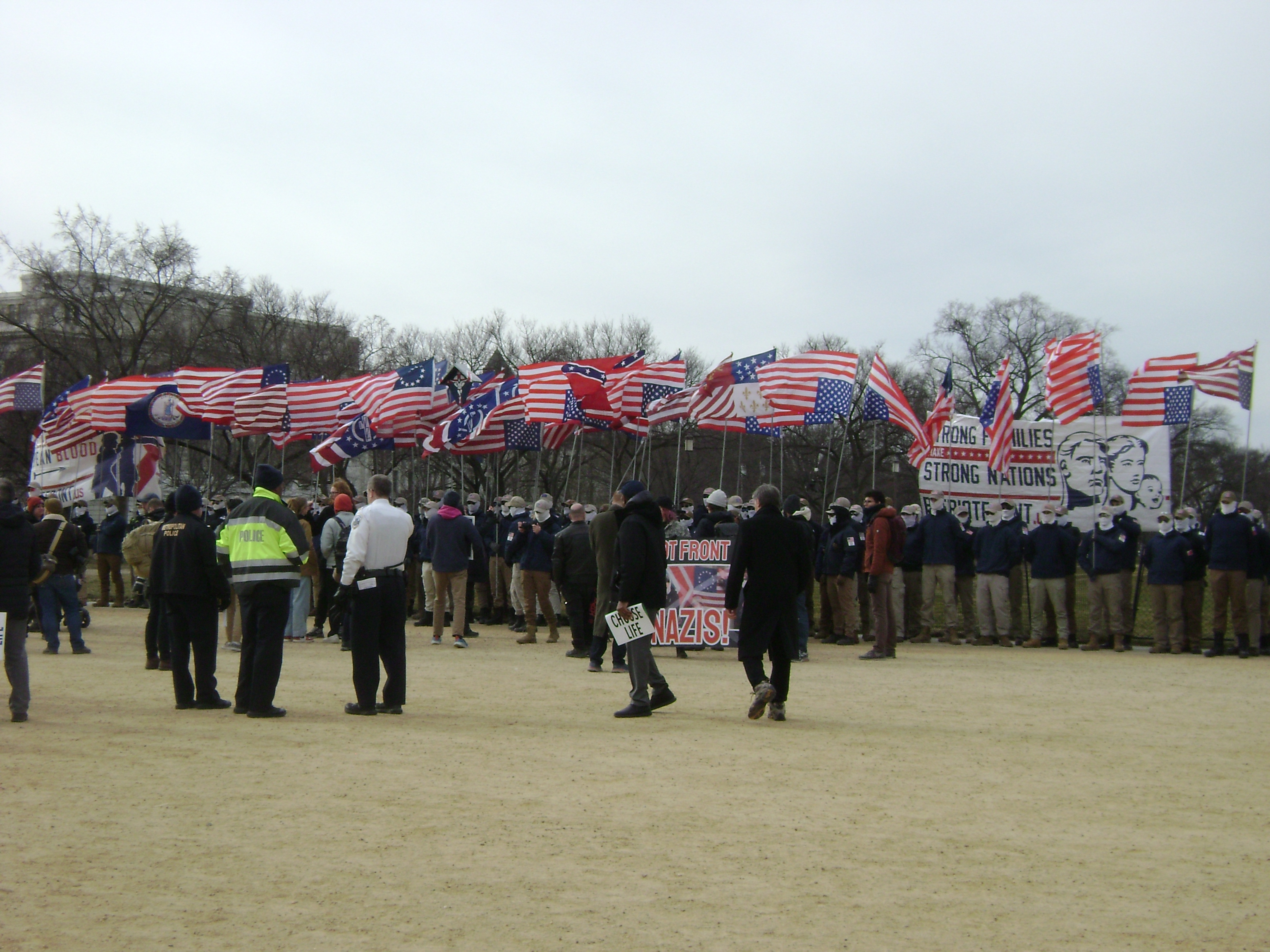
Members near the National Mall during the 2026 March for Life, with a counter-protester holding a sign labeling the group as Nazis

On January 23, members of Patriot Front were reported to have attended and demonstrated at the annual March for Life near the National Mall in Washington, D.C. Their presence prompted counter-protests from other demonstrators, who accused the group of espousing neo-Nazi ideology.

On March 8, members of the Patriot Front made two appearances in Sheboygan, Wisconsin, and Manitowoc, Wisconsin. Later, on March 12, 2026, a counter protest occurred at Shipbuilders Park in Manitowoc in protest of the earlier presence of the Patriot Front.

On July 4, during the United States' 250th Independence Day, hundreds of Patriot Front members marched in Washington, D.C., chanting "Reclaim America."

== Leaked online chats ==
On January 21, 2022, Unicorn Riot, a left-wing nonprofit media organization, published more than 400 gigabytes of leaked audio files, chat logs, documents, photographs and videos from Patriot Front's chat server. The leak revealed the group's efforts to recruit new members and increase its public profile through private communications on Rocket.Chat, an open-source messaging platform.

The chat logs showed the group struggled to expand membership, often reprimanding members for not meeting fitness and participation requirements, according to The Guardian. In a conversation with Patriot Front "lieutenants" on December 14, 2021, Rousseau wrote, "We are absolutely desperate for new people. We've been in the 220's to 230's membership rut for nearly a full year."

The communications revealed the group attempted to inflate its membership numbers and importance; outlined plans to spread misinformation about public events on social media sites, such as Twitter, Reddit and 4chan, and send deceptive news tips to journalists at traditional media outlets; and detailed notes of interviews with potential members. The leak also included media showing members training, vandalizing, and demonstrating; Rousseau at a 2021 American Renaissance conference; and Patriot Front's guides to behavior.

In August 2023, five Patriot Front affiliated individuals filed a lawsuit against an alleged member of the Puget Sound John Brown Gun Club for the infiltration, demanding punitive damages and claiming the disclosure of their identities cost them their jobs.

== False flag conspiracies ==
In May 2023, some commentators, including Joe Rogan, alleged that the organization was an FBI sting operation or false flag by Antifa. Such claims have been debunked as conspiracy theories, and labelled as "False" by fact-checkers Snopes. In December 2023, X (Twitter) owner Elon Musk contributed to the speculation, replying to a user who described the group as "Fed Front" and echoing the user's question as to why group members who were arrested did not have their masks removed by police.

== See also ==
- List of neo-Nazi organizations
- List of organizations designated by the Southern Poverty Law Center as hate groups
- List of white nationalist organizations
