= Vanguard America =

American white supremacist, neo-Nazi, neo-fascist organization

- Abbreviation: VA
- Formation: 2015; 11 years ago
- Type: Neo-Nazism; Neo-fascism; White supremacism White nationalism
- Location: United States
- Members: 200+ (2017)
- Key people: Dillon Irizarry; Thomas Rousseau
- Affiliations: Nationalist Front; Patriot Front (splinter group); National Socialist Legion (splinter group)
- Website: vanguardamerica.online (defunct, site archived)

Vanguard America (VA) was an American white supremacist, neo-Nazi, neo-fascist organization and a member of the Nationalist Front. Its roots were in the alt-right movement, and the group gained significant attention after it was revealed that James Alex Fields had marched with it at the Unite the Right rally before being arrested on murder charges.

== History ==
VA first gained coverage in 2016, when Dillon Irizarry gave a speech at a neo-Nazi gathering in Pikeville, Kentucky, stating that he was the leader of the group and that it had 200 members in 20 states. Irizarry went on to say that VA was founded in 2015 in California, and that he had taken over its leadership instead of founding it. Irizarry, a Marine Corps veteran who had served in Afghanistan, also claimed that, while "many" members were veterans, active duty service members were prohibited, for their "safety", from affiliating with the group until their contract had ended. (Note: Possibly due to the US military's screening procedures meant to prevent recruitment of those affiliated with gangs or extremist groups.) He also claimed that local branches existed in Arizona, California, Florida, Indiana, Louisiana, Maryland, Massachusetts, New Jersey, Oregon, Pennsylvania, Texas, Virginia, and Washington. In July 2017, VA created a women's division.

In June 2017, the group held a "Texas is Ours" rally in Austin, Texas. During the event the leader of the Texan branch, Thomas Rousseau, gave a lengthy speech and largely sidelined VA's leader Dillon Hopper. After the rally Hopper began to engage in a public feud with Rousseau, accusing him of attempting to portray himself as the leader of VA.

The group had a presence led by Rousseau in the Unite the Right rally in August 2017, with Hopper entirely absent. James Alex Fields, who was later responsible for killing a counter protester and injuring 19 others in a vehicle-ramming attack, was seen marching with the group and carrying a shield displaying a symbol associated with Vanguard America. The leadership later disavowed him, stating that he was not a member of the group. The group took part in the "White Lives Matter" rally in October 2017. On December 18, 2017, its account was suspended by Twitter.

After the rally, as Hopper was largely dealing with the fallout of Fields' action, Rousseau and his Texas branch of the VA split in August to form Patriot Front. As Patriot Front siphoned off most of the VA's more moderate Neo-Fascists, the remaining Neo-Nazis within the VA again started a feud with Hopper, with the remains of the Texas, as well as the Tennessee branch, splitting in January 2018 to form the National Socialist Legion. Since then, the Anti-Defamation League has stated that VA "has shown very few signs of life."

Flags used by Vanguard America's Texas Branch, which ultimately split to form Patriot Front

=== National Socialist Legion ===
NSL

The National Socialist Legion (NSL) was a brief American neo-Nazi organization that split from the VA in January 2018 due to accusations of ineffective leadership and infighting. The NSL was briefly active in around eight U.S. states, mainly distributing propaganda. According to the Anti-Defamation League, the group describes itself as a "revolutionary National Socialist organization" preparing for "the coming Racial Holy War." New members of the NSL are purportedly required to read white supremacist texts, including The Turner Diaries and Siege. The NSL was originally led by a man using the alias of “fox,” who was later succeeded by Clayton Hodge The NSL showed little activity after formation, as the bulk of former VA members had joined Patriot Front instead.

== Views ==
The group supports the Nazi concept of blood and soil.

The group is best known for its racist and antisemitic flyers they put up in various towns. This strategy would be carried over by Patriot Front.

== See also ==
- Neo-Nazi groups of the United States
- White supremacy in the United States
