= List of works about Barack Obama =

This bibliography of Barack Obama is a list of written and published works, both books and films, about Barack Obama, the 44th president of the United States.

== Scholarly books and articles ==
- Abramsky, Sasha (December 1, 2009). Inside Obama's Brain. Penguin. ISBN 978-1-101-15953-8.
- Alter, Jonathan B. (2010). The Promise: President Obama, Year One. New York: Simon & Schuster. ISBN 978-1-4391-0119-3.
- Andersen, Christopher P. (2009). Barack and Michelle: Portrait of an American Marriage. New York: William Morrow. ISBN 978-0-06-177196-5.
- Anonymous (2011). O: A Presidential Novel. New York: Simon & Schuster. ISBN 978-1-4516-2596-7.
- Baker, Peter (2017). Obama: The Call of History. New York Times/Callaway. ISBN 978-0935112900.
- Bolton, John R.; Geller, Pamela A.; Spencer, Robert C. (2010). The Post-American Presidency: The Obama Administration's War on America. Threshold Editions. ISBN 978-1-4391-8930-6.
- Bolton, John R. (February 2011). How Barack Obama Is Endangering Our National Sovereignty. ISBN 978-1-4587-3046-6.
- Brewer, Dirk; Jocelyn, J. Michael (January 6, 2010). President Obama's Broken Promises: Race, Religion & Gay Rights. Independently Published. ISBN 978-1-7181-9690-2.
- Cashill, Jack (October 7, 2014). "You Lie!": The Evasions, Omissions, Fabrications, Frauds and Outright Falsehoods of Barack Obama. Harper Collins. ISBN 978-0-06-234752-7.
- Carney, Timothy P. (November 30, 2009). Obamanomics: How Barack Obama Is Bankrupting You and Enriching His Wall Street Friends, Corporate Lobbyists, and Union Bosses. Simon & Schuster. ISBN 978-1-59698-134-8.
- Chait, Jonathan (2017). Audacity: How Barack Obama Defied His Critics and Created a Legacy That Will Prevail. Custom House. ISBN 978-0062426970.
- Chollet, Derek (2016). The Long Game: How Obama Defied Washington and Redefined America's Role in the World. New York: Public Affairs. ISBN 978-1610396608.
- Congressional Quarterly. Congress and the Nation: Volume 13: 2009-2012 (CQ Press, 2013) online, 1075 pp of highly detailed coverage of all major themes
  - Congressional Quarterly. Congress and the Nation: Volume 14: 2012-2016 (CQ Press, 2017)
- Conley, Richard S., and Kevin Baron. "Obama’s ‘Hidden-Hand’ Presidency: Myth, Metaphor, or Misrepresentation?." White House Studies 13 (2015): 129-57.
- Clair, Jeffrey St; Frank, Joshua (May 15, 2012). Hopeless: Barack Obama and the Politics of Illusion. AK Press. ISBN 978-1-84935-111-9.
- Cobb, Jelani (October 13, 2020). The Substance of Hope: Barack Obama and the Paradox of Progress. Bloomsbury Publishing USA. ISBN 978-1-63557-743-3.
- Corsi, Jerome R. (2008). The Obama Nation: Leftist Politics and the Cult of Personality. New York: Threshold Editions/Simon & Schuster. ISBN 978-1-4165-9806-0.
- Crotty, William, ed. (2012). The Obama Presidency: Promise and Performance. Lexington Books. ISBN 978-0739172346.
- D'Antonio, Michael (2017). A Consequential President: The Legacy of Barack Obama. Thomas Dunne Books. ISBN 978-1250081391.
- D'Souza, Dinesh (October 4, 2011). The Roots of Obama's Rage. Regnery Publishing. ISBN 978-1-59698-276-5.
- D'Souza, Dinesh (July 2014). Obama's America: Unmaking the American Dream. Simon & Schuster. ISBN 978-1-4767-7335-3.
- Delingpole, James (February 9, 2009). Welcome to Obamaland: I Have Seen Your Future and It Doesn't Work. Simon & Schuster. ISBN 978-1-59698-098-3.
- Dorrien, Gary (February 16, 2012). The Obama Question: A Progressive Perspective. Rowman & Littlefield Publishers. ISBN 978-1-4422-1539-9.
- Freddoso, David (2008). The Case Against Barack Obama: The Unlikely Rise and Unexamined Agenda of the Media's Favorite Candidate. Washington, D.C.: Regnery Publishing. ISBN 978-1-59698-566-7.
- Freddoso, David (2011). Gangster Government: Barack Obama and the New Washington Thugocracy. Regnery Publishing. ISBN 9781596986480.
- Freddoso, David (January 28, 2013). Spin Masters: How the Media Ignored the Real News and Helped Reelect Barack Obama. Regnery Publishing. ISBN 978-1-62157-080-6.
- Frazier, Mondo (October 25, 2011). The Secret Life of Barack Hussein Obama. Simon & Schuster. ISBN 978-1-4516-3320-7.
- Gaman-Golutvina, Oxana. "Political elites in the USA under George W. Bush and Barack Obama: Structure and international politics." Historical Social Research/Historische Sozialforschung 43.4 (2018): 141-163. online
- Garrow, David, Rising Star: The Making of Barack Obama (May 2017)
- Gillespie, Andra (January 14, 2019). Race and the Obama Administration: Substance, symbols, and hope. Manchester University Press. ISBN 978-1-5261-0503-5.
- Grunwald, Michael (2012). The New New Deal: The Hidden Story of Change in the Obama Era. New York: Simon & Schuster. ISBN 978-1-4516-4232-2.
- Halperin, Mark S.; Heilemann, John (2010). Game Change: Obama and the Clintons, McCain and Palin, and the Race of a Lifetime. New York: Harper. ISBN 978-0-06-196620-0.
- Halperin, Mark S.; Heilemann, John (2012). Double Down: Game Change 2012. New York: Harper. ISBN 978-1594204401.
- Hannity, Sean (2010). Conservative Victory: Defeating Obama's Radical Agenda. Harper Paperbacks. ISBN 978-0-06-200305-8.
- Healy, Gene (October 17, 2012). False Idol: Barack Obama and the Continuing Cult of the Presidency. Cato Institute. ISBN 978-0-932790-41-5.
- Hewitt, Hugh (June 26, 2012). The Brief Against Obama: The Rise, Fall & Epic Fail of the Hope & Change Presidency. Center Street. ISBN 978-1-4555-1629-2.
- Hodge, Roger D. (October 5, 2010). The Mendacity of Hope: Barack Obama and the Betrayal of American Liberalism. Harper Collins. ISBN 978-0-06-202496-1.
- Ingraham, Laura (2010). The Obama Diaries. Threshold Editions. ISBN 978-1-4391-9751-6.
- Jacobs, Sally H. (2011). The Other Barack: The Bold and Reckless Life of President Obama's Father. New York: PublicAffairs. ISBN 978-1-58648-793-5.
- Kaufman, Burton I. (March 15, 2022). Barack Obama: Conservative, Pragmatist, Progressive. Cornell University Press. ISBN 978-1-5017-6199-7.
- Klein, Edward (June 3, 2013). The Amateur: Barrack Obama in the White House. Simon & Schuster. ISBN 978-1-62157-165-0.
- Lee, T. S. (2009). The Obama Story: The Boy With the Biggest Dream! (Great Heroes) (in Korean). Dasan Productions. ISBN 978-0-9819542-0-2.
- Limbaugh, David (2010). Crimes Against Liberty: An Indictment of President Barack Obama. Washington, D.C.: Regnery Publishing, Inc. ISBN 978-1-59698-624-4.
- Limbaugh, David (2012). The Great Destroyer. Washington, D.C.: Regnery Publishing, Inc. ISBN 978-1-59698-777-7.
- Litt, David (September 19, 2017). Thanks, Obama: My Hopey, Changey White House Years (A Speechwriter's Memoir). HarperCollins. ISBN 978-0-06-256846-5.
- McElya, Micki (2011). "To "Choose Our Better History": Assessing the Obama Presidency in Real Time". American Quarterly. 63: 179–189. doi:10.1353/aq.2011.0012. S2CID 145168784.
- Maass, Matthias. The World Views of the Obama Era (Palgrave Macmillan, 2018).
- McGann, Eileen; Morris, Dick (2009). Catastrophe: How Obama, Congress, and the Special Interests Are Transforming a Slump Into a Crash, Freedom Into Socialism, and a Disaster Into a Catastrophe... and How to Fight Back. New York: Harper. ISBN 978-0-06-177104-0.
- Malkin, Michelle (2009). Culture of Corruption: Obama and His Team of Tax Cheats, Crooks, and Cronies. Washington, D.C.: Regnery Publishing. ISBN 978-1-59698-109-6.
- Mattera, Jason (2010). Obama Zombies: How the Liberal Machine Brainwashed My Generation. Threshold Editions. ISBN 978-1-4391-7207-0.
- Maraniss, David (2012). Barack Obama: The Story. New York: Simon & Schuster. ISBN 978-1-4391-6040-4.
- Mendell, David (2007). Obama: From Promise to Power. New York: Amistad/HarperCollinsPublishers. ISBN 978-0-06-085820-9.
- Michener, Mitch (July 2011). Barack Obama: Hope Destroyed. Tate Publishing. ISBN 978-1-61777-320-4.
- Newberry, Tommy (January 12, 2010). The War On Success: How the Obama Agenda Is Shattering the American Dream. Simon & Schuster. ISBN 978-1-59698-136-2.
- Obama, Barack; et al. (2008). Change We Can Believe In: Barack Obama's Plan to Renew America's Promise. New York: Three Rivers Press. ISBN 978-0-307-46045-5.
- Obenshain, Kate (September 4, 2012). Divider-in-Chief: The Fraud of Hope and Change. Simon & Schuster. ISBN 978-1-62157-016-5.
- Patterson, Gary R. (July 14, 2020). A President's Dithering False Bravado: Obama Caved in Accepting Putin's Rigged Syrian Weapons Deal. Outskirts Press, Incorporated. ISBN 978-1-9772-2144-5.
- Patterson, Robert (August 31, 2010). Conduct Unbecoming: How Barack Obama is Destroying The Military and Endangering Our Security. Simon and Schuster. ISBN 978-1-59698-161-4.
- Press, Bill (January 31, 2012). The Obama Hate Machine: The Lies, Distortions, and Personal Attacks on the President---and Who Is Behind Them. Macmillan. ISBN 978-1-4299-4125-9.
- Presta, John (2010). Mr. and Mrs. Grassroots: How Barack Obama, Two Bookstore Owners, and 300 Volunteers Did It. Paoli, Pennsylvania: The Elevator Group. ISBN 978-0-375-70230-3.
- Pomante (Ii), Michael J.; Schraufnagel, Scot (2018). Historical Dictionary of the Barack Obama Administration. ISBN 978-1538111512.
- Price, Joann F. (November 21, 2008). Barack Obama: The Voice of an American Leader. Bloomsbury Publishing USA. ISBN 978-0-313-36237-8.
- Rall, Ted (June 19, 2012). The Book of Obama: From Hope and Change to the Age of Revolt. Seven Stories Press. ISBN 978-1-60980-451-0.
- Remnick, David (2011). The Bridge: The Life and Rise of Barack Obama. London: Vintage. ISBN 978-0-981-97192-6.
- Rudalevige, Andrew (2012). "'A Majority Is the Best Repartee': Barack Obama and Congress, 2009-2012". Social Science Quarterly. 93 (5): 1272–1294. doi:10.1111/j.1540-6237.2012.00910.x.
- Rudalevige, Andrew (2016). "The Contemporary Presidency: The Obama Administrative Presidency: Some Late-Term Patterns". Presidential Studies Quarterly. 46 (4): 868–890. doi:10.1111/psq.12323.
- Savage, Charlie (2015). Power Wars: Inside Obama's Post-9/11 Presidency. New York: Little, Brown and Company. ISBN 9780316286572. OCLC 907941518. Ebook edition: Power Wars: The Relentless Rise of Presidential Authority and Secrecy.
- Scott, Janny (2011). A Singular Woman: The Untold Story of Barack Obama's Mother. Riverhead Hardcover. ISBN 978-1-59448-797-2.
- Schneiderhan, Erik (May 27, 2015). The Size of Others' Burdens: Barack Obama, Jane Addams, and the Politics of Helping Others. Stanford University Press. ISBN 978-0-8047-9495-4.
- Shapiro, Ben (April 28, 2015). The People Vs. Barack Obama: The Criminal Case Against the Obama Administration. Simon & Schuster. ISBN 978-1-4767-6515-0.
- Skocpol, Theda; Jacobs, Lawrence R. (2012). "Accomplished and Embattled: Understanding Obama's Presidency". Political Science Quarterly. 127: 1–24. doi:10.1002/j.1538-165X.2012.tb00718.x.
- von Marschall, Christoph (2007). Barack Obama - Der schwarze Kennedy [Barack Obama – The black Kennedy] (in German). Orell Fuessli Verlag. ISBN 978-3-280-06108-4.
- White, John Kenneth (2009). Barack Obama's America: How New Conceptions of Race, Family, and Religion Ended the Reagan Era. University of Michigan Press. ISBN 978-0-472-11450-4.
- Wise, Tim (2009). Between Barack and a Hard Place: Racism and White Denial in the Age of Obama. San Francisco: City Lights Books. ISBN 978-0-87286-500-6.
- Wolffe, Richard (2009). Renegade: The Making of a President. New York: Three Rivers Press. ISBN 978-0-307-46313-5.
- Wolffe, Richard (2010). Revival: The Struggle for Survival Inside the Obama White House. Crown Publishing Group. ISBN 978-0-307-71741-2.
- Wolffe, Richard (2013). The Message: The Reselling of President Obama. Twelve. ISBN 978-1455581566.
- Woodward, Bob (2010). Obama's Wars. New York: Simon & Schuster. ISBN 978-1-4391-7249-0.
- Zelizer, Julian E. (2018). The Presidency of Barack Obama: A First Historical Assessment. Princeton University Press. ISBN 978-0691160283.

=== Autobiographies ===
- Obama, Barack (2004). Dreams from My Father: A Story of Race and Inheritance. New York: Broadway. ISBN 1400082773.
- Obama, Barack (2008). The Audacity of Hope. New York: Vintage. ISBN 978-0307455871.
- Obama, Barack (November 17, 2020). A Promised Land. New York: Crown. ISBN 978-1-5247-6316-9.

=== Rhetoric ===
- Baysha, Olga. "Synecdoche that kills: How Barack Obama and Vladimir Putin constructed different Ukraines for different ends." International Communication Gazette 80.3 (2018): 230-249.
- Belisle, Jordan, et al. "Feasibility of contextual behavioral speech analyses of US presidents: Inaugural addresses of Bill Clinton, George W. Bush, Barack Obama, and Donald Trump, 1993–2017." Journal of Contextual Behavioral Science 10 (2018): 14-18.
- Bostdorff, Denise M. "Obama, Trump, and reflections on the rhetoric of political change." Rhetoric & Public Affairs 20.4 (2017): 695-706. online
- Ferrara, Mark S. (July 16, 2013). Barack Obama and the Rhetoric of Hope. McFarland. ISBN 978-0-7864-6793-8.
- Gleason, Timothy R., and Sara S. Hansen. "Image control: The visual rhetoric of President Obama." Howard Journal of Communications 28.1 (2017): 55-71.
- Hill, Theon E. "Sanitizing the struggle: Barack Obama, Selma, and civil rights memory." Communication Quarterly 65.3 (2017): 354-376.
- Holliday, N. "'My Presiden(t) and Firs(t) Lady Were Black': Style, Context, and Coronal Stop Deletion in the Speech of Barack and Michelle Obama." American Speech: A Quarterly of Linguistic Usage (2017) 92(4), 459-486, “My Presiden(t) and Firs(t) Lady Were Black”:
- Holliday, Nicole, Jason Bishop, and Grace Kuo. "Prosody and political style: The case of Barack Obama and the L+ H* Pitch accent." Proceedings of the 10th International Conference on Speech Prosody 2020. online
- Iversen, Stefan, and Henrik Skov Nielsen. "Invention as intervention in the rhetoric of Barack Obama." Storyworlds: A Journal of Narrative Studies 9.1-2 (2017): 121-142.
- Kurtz, Jeffrey B. "'To Have Your Experience Denied... it Hurts': Barack Obama, James Baldwin, and the Politics of Black Anger." Howard Journal of Communications 28.1 (2017): 93-106.
- Perry, Samuel. "Barack Obama, civil mourning, and prudence in presidential rhetoric." Howard Journal of Communications 28.2 (2017): 160-173
- St. Onge, Jeffrey. "Neoliberalism as common sense in Barack Obama’s health care rhetoric." Rhetoric Society Quarterly 47.4 (2017): 295-312.
- Widiatmika, Putu Wahyu, I. Made Budiarsa, and I. Gde Sadia. "Rhetorical Schemes in Barack Obama’s Winning Speech." Humanis 24.4: 394-401. online

=== Editions of his speeches ===
- Dionne, E. J. Jr., and Joy-Ann Reid, eds. We are the change we seek: The speeches of Barack Obama (Bloomsbury Publishing USA, 2017).
- Easton, Jaclyn, ed. (2008). Inspire a Nation: Barack Obama's Most Electrifying Speeches of the 2008 Election. Publishing 180. ISBN 978-0982100509.
- Emerson, Ralph Waldo; Obama, Barack; Lincoln, Abraham (2009). The Inaugural Address, 2009: Together with Abraham Lincoln's First and Second Inaugural Addresses and the Gettysburg Address and Ralph Waldo Emerson's Self-Reliance. New York: Penguin Books. ISBN 978-0-14-311642-4.
- Olive, David I. (2008). An American Story: The Speeches of Barack Obama: A Primer. Toronto: ECW Press. ISBN 978-1-55022-864-9.
- Rogak, Lisa (2009). Barack Obama in His Own Words. Running Press Miniature Editions. ISBN 978-0-7624-3789-4.
- Ruth, Greg (2009). Our Enduring Spirit: President Barack Obama's First Words to America. London: Collins. ISBN 978-0-06-183455-4.
- Sharpley-Whiting, T. Denean (2009). The Speech: Race and Barack Obama's "A More Perfect Union". Bloomsbury USA. ISBN 978-1-59691-667-8.

== Films ==
- 2016: Obama's America. Directed by Dinesh D'Souza & John Sullivan, Obama's America Foundation, 2012.
- America's Great Divide. Directed by Michael Kirk, Kirk Documentary Group, 2020.
- Barry. Directed by Vikram Gandhi, Black Bear Pictures & Cinetic Media, 2016.
- Change. Directed by Matteo Barzini, Feel Film, 2010.
- Dreams from My Real Father. Directed by Joel Gilbert, Highway 61 Entertainment, 2012.
- The Final Year. Directed by Greg Barker, HBO, 2017.
- I Want Your Money. Directed by Ray Griggs, RG Entertainment, 2010.
- Obama Anak Menteng. Directed by Damien Dematra & John de Rantau, Multivision Plus Pictures, 2010.
- Obama Mama. Directed by Vivian Norris, VNM Productions, 2014.
- Phas Gaye Re Obama. Directed by Subhash Kapoor, Revel Films, 2010.
- Southside with You. Directed by Richard Tanne, IM Global & Get Lifted Film, 2016.
