= Maraniss =

Maraniss is a surname. Notable people with the surname include:

- Andrew Maraniss, American sportswriter
- David Maraniss (born 1949), American journalist and author
