= Dreams from My Real Father =

- DVD cover with pictures of Barack Obama Sr., Barack Obama and Frank Marshall Davis
- Directed by: Joel Gilbert
- Written by: Joel Gilbert
- Produced by: Joel Gilbert
- Narrated by: Ed Law
- Edited by: Paul Belanger; Joel Gilbert
- Music by: Wayne Peet
- Production company: Highway 61 Entertainment
- Distributed by: MVD Visual
- Release date: July 24, 2012
- Running time: 95 minutes
- Country: United States
- Language: English

Dreams from My Real Father: A Story of Reds and Deception is a 2012 American film by Joel Gilbert. It presents his conspiracy theory that U.S. President Barack Obama's biological father was Frank Marshall Davis, an American poet and labor activist in Chicago and Hawaii, rather than Barack Obama Sr. The film claims that Davis, who had been a closet member of the Communist Party USA, influenced Obama's ideology, a claim disputed by Obama biographer David Remnick. The title is derived from Obama's memoir about his early life, Dreams from My Father (1995). Reviews of the film were generally negative, noting that Gilbert had not proved any of his allegations, and the film was described as a "pseudo-documentary" and in "bad taste".

== Background ==
The film alleges that Frank Marshall Davis, an African-American journalist, poet and labor activist, met Obama's mother Ann Dunham through her father Stanley Dunham. Filmmaker Gilbert claims that the senior Dunham was not a furniture salesman, but rather a Central Intelligence Agency (CIA) agent tasked with monitoring communists in Hawaii. His claim is unsupported. In his memoir, Obama had noted that his grandfather Stanley Dunham and Davis were friends in Hawaii, and both had grown up in Kansas.

Filmmaker Gilbert said the film was the result of two years of research. He claims he found nude and fetish photos of Obama's late mother Ann Dunham, which he says were taken in late 1960 by Davis in Davis's Hawaii home. Gilbert compared these to Dunham's high school pictures and says he found the similarity to be "obvious". The Hollywood Reporter said, "He did not use an expert, however, to support his finding."

Gilbert says that more than one million copies of his film were mailed to voters in Iowa, Ohio, Nevada, New Hampshire and Colorado prior to the 2012 United States presidential election. He refused to disclose who funded the film's wide mailings. The Daily Beast reported that there was no way to verify the numbers claimed by Gilbert.

== Reception ==
Critical reaction to the film was largely negative. David Maraniss, author of Barack Obama: The Story, described the film as "preposterous", saying that it is "depressing to have so much fictional, unreported, conspiratorial, unhistorical stuff floating around." Among anti-Obama productions, Maraniss said "This DVD is the worst of the bunch."

The Daily Beast commentator Michelle Goldberg wrote, "It's tempting to ignore Dreams from My Real Father because it's so preposterous ... What matters here is not that a lone crank made a vulgar conspiracy video, one that outdoes even birther propaganda in its lunacy and bad taste. It's that the video is finding an audience on the right." The Hollywood Reporter stated that the film makes unsubstantiated allegations that President Barack Obama lied about being the son of Barack Obama Sr., and quoted Steve Murphy, a Democratic consultant, who said, "It's about the lowest thing you can do to accuse, with no evidence, the opposition candidate's mother of being a porn star ... There are two motives behind this—racism and money. It's a cynical attempt to make some coin and exploit the views of the fringes of mainstream views."

Slate said that the film "peddles a conspiracy theory so convoluted that more traditional birthers must be envious of its creativity".

Orly Taitz, who has said she believes that Obama was not born in the United States (the birther theory), disliked the film, as it claims Obama's father was an American, albeit a Communist. Neither allegation was supported.

Gilbert rejected this position: "... 'birthers' are barking up the wrong tree. It's not a question of where Obama was born—but rather, one of paternity."

Bill Armistead, the chairman of the Alabama Republican Party, called the film's theory "absolutely terrifying".

Barack Obama's estranged half-brother Malik Obama gave an interview to Gilbert and expressed interest in his theory.

=== Debunking ===
Gilbert's claim that Obama's mother posed nude, allegedly by Davis, was proven false after blogger Loren Collins found that most of the photos Gilbert presented as evidence of his claim came from a magazine that ceased publication two years before Obama's mother arrived in Hawaii. Gilbert altered promotion of this claim on the website for his film in response to Collins's debunking, but he has never admitted his claim has been proven false or provided evidence to counter the debunking.

== 2014 Federal Election Commission complaint ==
In 2014 activist Loren Collins filed a complaint against Gilbert with the Federal Election Commission, saying that the filmmaker was required to disclose his donors who financed the pre-election mailing of millions of unsolicited DVDs of the film to voters in several swing states. The Washington Post reported that in March 2016, the FEC, split evenly between Republican and Democratic members, ruled that Gilbert's DVD mailing was considered "press", and therefore not subject to donor disclosure as the mass-mailing could be argued to be a "marketing effort".
