= Color blind (disambiguation) =

Color blindness, also known as color vision deficiency, is a symptom that concerns diminished color vision and the decreased ability to see or distinguish colors.

The term may also refer to:

== Vision ==
- Congenital red-green color blindness, the genetic condition that causes the most cases of color blindness.
- Dichromacy, a type of color vision possessed by most mammals; partial color blindness when in humans.
- Monochromacy, a lack of color vision; total color blindness when in humans.
- Achromatopsia, a syndrome that includes total color blindness.
- Blue cone monochromacy, a genetic condition that causes total color blindness.
- Cerebral achromatopsia or color agnosia, a type of color blindness caused by damage to the cerebral cortex of the brain, rather than the retina.

== Law and sociology ==
- Racial color blindness, discussing the connotations surrounding the term in law and society

== Arts and entertainment ==
- Colour Blind (play), by Kaul and Kalki Koechlin

=== Books ===
- Colorblind (book), a 2010 book on racism by Nicholas Morris
- Colour Blind, a 1953 novel by Catherine Cookson
- Color Blind, a 1946 study of racism in Georgia by Margaret Halsey

=== Film and television ===
- Colour blind, 1988 TV series with Niamh Cusack
- "Color Blind", an episode from season 1 of Alias
- "Colour Blind" (Doctors), a 2004 television episode

=== Music ===
==== Albums ====
- Colorblind (Candice Alley album), 2003
- Colorblind (Robert Randolph album), 2006
- Colour Blind (Seaway album), 2015
- Colorblind, a 2010 album by Dutch singer Alain Clark
- Color Blind, a 1969 album by Dave "The Man" Allen

==== Songs ====
- "Colorblind" (Chroma Key song)
- "Colorblind" (Counting Crows song)
- "Colourblind" (Darius Campbell song)
- "Colorblind", by Amber Riley
- "Colorblind", by Beach Bunny from Honeymoon
- "Color Blind", by Diplo featuring Lil Xan; See Diplo discography
- "Colourblind", by Ed Sheeran from - (album)
- "Color Blind", by Ice Cube from the album Death Certificate (album)
- "Colorblind", by Panda Eyes from the compilation album KIKO
- "Colour Blind", by Small Town Pistols
- "Colour Blind", by The Future Sound of London from Environments II
