= WSU Press =

WSU Press may refer to:

- Washington State University Press
- Wayne State University Press

== See also ==
- WSU (disambiguation)
