= Rome 1960 =

Rome 1960 may refer to:

- The 1960 Summer Olympics, held in Rome, Italy
- The 1960 Summer Paralympics, held in Rome, Italy
- Rome 1960: The Olympics that Changed the World, a 2008 book by David Maraniss about the 1960 Summer Olympics
