= Super Capers =

Superhero comedy film directed by Ray Griggs

Super Capers: The Origins of Ed and the Missing Bullion
- Theatrical release poster
- Directed by: Ray Griggs
- Written by: Ray Griggs
- Produced by: Michael Kim Binder
- Starring: Justin Whalin; Michael Rooker; Ryan McPartlin; Samuel Lloyd; Danielle Harris; Ray Griggs; Christine Lakin; Jon Polito; Adam West; June Lockhart; Doug Jones; Clint Howard; Tom Sizemore
- Cinematography: Martin Rosenberg
- Edited by: Stacy Katzman
- Music by: Nathan Lanier
- Production company: RG Entertainment
- Distributed by: Roadside Attractions
- Release date: March 20, 2009
- Running time: 98 minutes
- Country: United States
- Language: English
- Box office: $30,955

Super Capers: The Origins of Ed and the Missing Bullion is a 2009 American superhero comedy film and a parody of superhero films, written and directed by Ray Griggs, and starring Justin Whalin, Michael Rooker, Ryan McPartlin, Samuel Lloyd, Danielle Harris, Ray Griggs, Christine Lakin, Jon Polito, Adam West, June Lockhart, Doug Jones, Clint Howard, and Tom Sizemore. This was Lockhart's final on-screen film role. It tells the story about an aspiring superhero who is assigned to a halfway house for superheroes with powers that haven't been developed as they fight the local criminals.

== Plot ==
The story begins with a beautiful girl (Christine Lakin) in a red outfit being followed through a dark alleyway by a mysterious man (Clint Howard) who clearly has criminal intent. As she corners herself in a dead end, Ed Gruberman (Justin Whalin) arrives to save the day. The woman, calling herself simply "Red" reveals to both of the men that she has superpowers, disabling the robber whom Ed strikes with a 2x4, sending him through the window of a law office owned by the lawyer Roger Cheatem (Tom Sizemore). Red kisses Gruberman passionately before disappearing into the night, and he is left standing as the police come to arrest him.

In court, Gruberman is standing trial for viciously attacking an "innocent bystander" with the mugger being defended by Cheatem. The case is flattened by the judge (Michael Rooker) who takes sympathy to Gruberman's story of how his parents were killed after an accident at their circus wound up with them being killed by a short bus. In particular his fascination and respect for the television superhero the Dark Winged Vesper, with whom Ed shares his orphaning (and lack of powers unbeknownst to the court). Ed is fined $1 for the payment to Roger's window and sentenced to a halfway house to superheroes whose powers still have not yet been developed.

Ed is taken there by a cab driver (Adam West) who proclaims he too was a superhero once, named the Manbat. When he arrives, he meets Sarge (Tommy Lister) who is the Capers' human liaison and other superheroes Puffer Boy (Ray Griggs), Herman Brainard (Sam Lloyd), Will Powers (Ryan McPartlin), and Felicia Freeze (Danielle Harris) with whom Ed develops an immediate attraction to. Associated with the Super Capers is the inventor Herbert Q (Oliver Muirhead) who has a robot (Brian Cummings) and whose primary invention was an RV fashioned after the DeLorean time machine from the Back to the Future films complete with a flux capacitor. Q can't tell if it actually works because the RV cannot get up to 88 miles per hour.

The group is called out on a mission to stop the supervillain Captain Sludge (Jon Polito) and his Minotaur minion Cretan (Bobby "Slim" Jones) who are robbing an armored car. In a show of panic, Gruberman prays for help. Thinking he has the power of "Prayer", Will sends him out to fight and he supposedly forces a lamppost to fall onto Cretan, allowing the heroes to be victorious and earning Felicia's eye. However, Gruberman's world begins to fall apart when he and Brainard attempt to follow the suspicious Judge incognito when he is picked up by his chauffeur (Taylor Negron). Ed is set up for stealing millions in Gold Bullion and sending them to a Swiss Bank account, which the number was found conveniently in his pocket.

Gruberman is taken by the Special Agents Smith (Doug Jones and Isaac C. Singleton Jr.) to visit the Judge. Red makes an appearance who reveals that the Judge is the Dark Winged Vesper and that she works for him. The Judge reveals himself to be Gruberman's father AND, and that the stunt that killed his parents was orchestrated by him (but not intended to be fatal). He attempts to lure Gruberman to the dark side (a'la Return of the Jedi).

Gruberman manages to escape. In an ensuing chase with Sludge, he drives the RV off the Mount Rushmore national monument. When telling God that he will soon be with him, the vehicle successfully reaches 88 miles per hour, sending him back to the date of his first mission 1 week prior (as Will Powers had put the date into the time circuits to mark the event). He travels to the bridge and learns that should he encounter his past self (before that he saw the judge and imitates the voice of Vito Corleone and the catchphrase "it was not personal, it was only business"), one of them would spontaneously combust.

He manages to meet the Super Capers, and in the process of revealing the Judge's plans encounters his younger self. After giving away the events to follow in the week ahead, the Judge is immobilized by Freeze, Sludge and Cretan surrender, and Red is defeated by Freeze who admits her attraction to Gruberman. The confusion of two Grubermans is resolved when the past version combusts, leaving only the one from the future and the day appears to be saved. After noticing that the Judge escaped leaving his dropped pants behind, Gruberman and the Super Capers then drive off in their RV.

In a post-credits scene, the Judge has met with his chauffeur and the Special Agents Smith stating that Gruberman has proved that God exists. The Special Agents Smith plan to unleash their powers as their eyes glow green. The words "To be continued" then appear on the screen.

== Cast ==
- Justin Whalin as Ed Gruberman, an aspiring superhero.
- Michael Rooker as Dark Winged Vesper / Bernard Raymond III, a judge and secret superhero-turned-supervillain.
- Ryan McPartlin as Will Powers, the vain member of the Super Capers who is the strongest of the group.
- Samuel Lloyd as Herman Brainard, a telepathic member of the Super Capers.
- Danielle Harris as Felicia Freeze, a cryokinetic member of the Super Capers.
- Ray Griggs as Puffer Boy, a member of the Super Capers with pufferfish abilities.
- Christine Lakin as Red, a super-powered associate of Dark Winged Vesper who possesses pyrokinesis, heat vision, and invisibility.
- Jon Polito as Captain Sludge, a diminutive supervillain with super-speed who is allied with Dark Winged Vesper.
- Adam West as Manbat, a former superhero who now works as a cab driver.
- June Lockhart as Mother(final theatrical performance by this legendary actress)
- Doug Jones as Special Agent Smith #1, a special agent that works for Dark Winged Vesper.
- Clint Howard as a Mugger that tried to mug Red.
- Tom Sizemore as Roger Cheatem, a lawyer that prosecutes Ed.
- Tommy "Tiny" Lister as Sarge, the human liaison to the Super Capers.
- Chris Owen as Igniter Boy, a pyrokinetic member of Super Capers who accidentally reduces himself to ash.
- Oliver Muirhead as Herbert Q, an unimaginative inventor and member of the Super Capers.
- Isaac C. Singleton Jr. as Special Agent Smith #2, an African-American special agent that works for Dark Winged Vesper and the "twin" of Special Agent Smith #1.
- Taylor Negron as the unnamed Chauffeur of Dark Winged Vesper.
- Bobby "Slim" Jones as the in-suit performer of Cretan, a Minotaur that works for Captain Sludge.
- Pat Crawford Brown as Gertrude
- Eva Marcille as News Reporter
- George Stults as Police Officer #2
- Steve Braun as Agent Guard
- Beverly Long as Marge
- Brian Cummings as the voice of the Robot, a small Terminator-like robot built by Herbert Q that speaks like Arnold Schwarzenegger even though Herbert Q denies it.

== Release ==
Super Capers: The Origins of Ed and the Missing Bullion grossed $21,463 in its opening weekend. The film grossed $30,955 while in theatres.

=== Home media ===
As of December 20, 2025, Super Capers: The Origins of Ed and the Missing Bullion has not been released for home viewing.

== Reception ==
On the review aggregator website Rotten Tomatoes, 6% of 18 critics' reviews are positive.

=== Critical response ===
Lael Loewenstein of Variety wrote in her review: "From its opening sequence to its post-credits coda, Super Capers struggles to find its tone." Nick Schager of Slant magazine wrote in his review: "Writer-director Ray Griggs not only pays homage to George Lucas and Steven Spielberg with Super Capers, a superhero comedy that regularly references their ’80s classics, but at one point arrogantly puts himself in their company by placing a mock poster for his short film Lucifer alongside those for Raiders of the Lost Ark and Return of the Jedi. Fat chance of him joining such illustrious ranks, since unlike the genre adventures he so clearly adores, Griggs’s insufferably sloppy spoof elicits only agony."

The Associated Press wrote in its review via The Hollywood Reporter: "Super Capers, about a halfway house for would-be superheroes, is a throwback C-grade spoof with B-movie aspirations." Nathan Lee of The New York Times wrote in his review: "There are bad movies and terrible movies, and movies so inexplicably, aggressively awful that your only possible response is to stare stupefied at the screen and ask yourself how such a fiasco could have come into existence."

Erik Amaya of CBR wrote in his review: "In lieu of situations creating the comedy, the film relies on pastiches, homage, and outright theft of scenes from the great popcorn movies of the 1980s, particularly Back to the Future and Return of the Jedi." Tyler Foster of DVD Talk wrote in his review: "The biggest flaw with the movie, though, and with pretty much every entry in the genre these days, is that Griggs doesn't know how to stage a joke to save his life."
