= Perry Wallace =

American basketball player and legal academic (1948–2017)

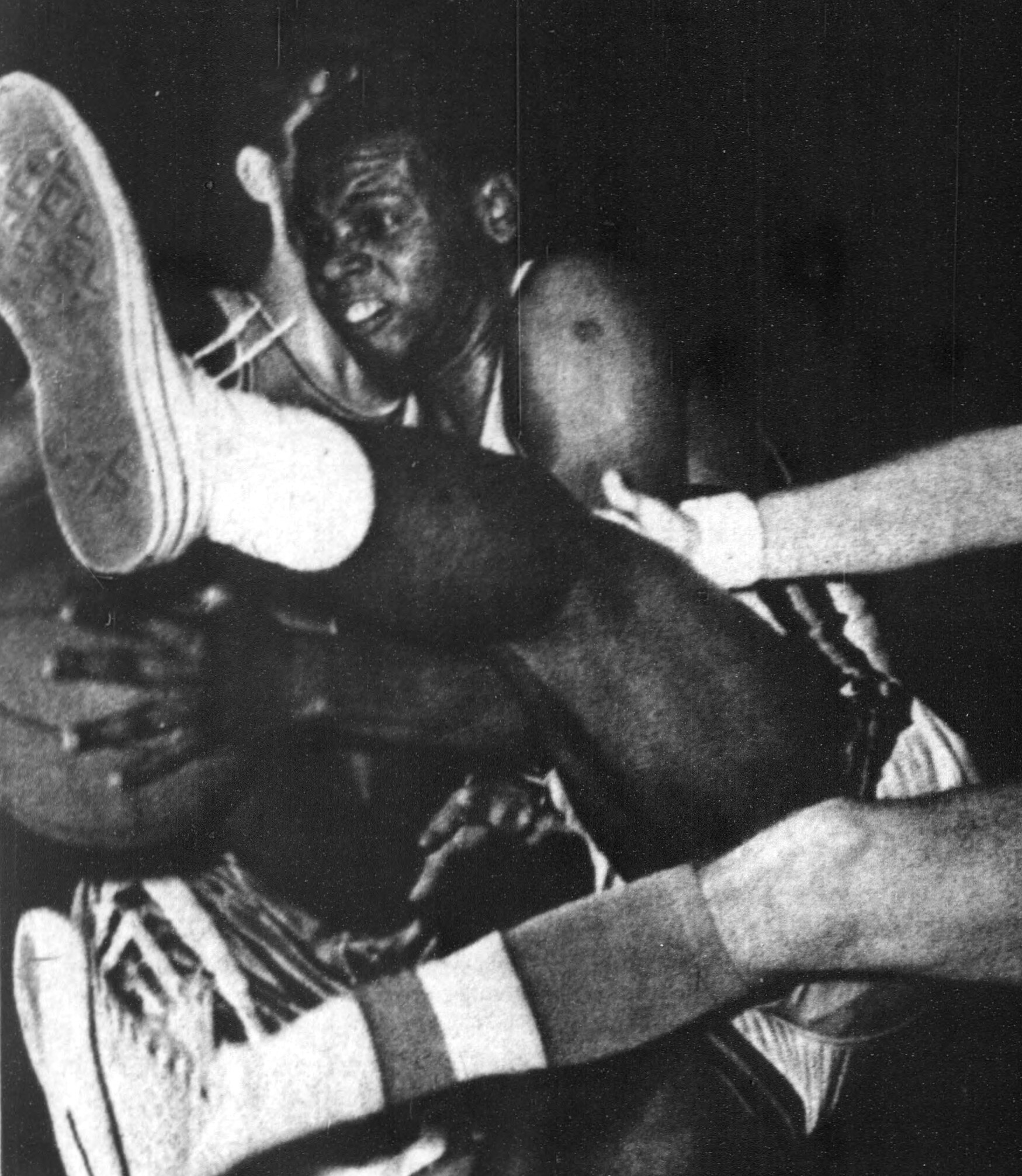
- Wallace during the 1967–68 season

Personal information
- Born: February 19, 1948 Nashville, Tennessee
- Died: December 1, 2017 (aged 69) Rockville, Maryland
- Listed height: 6 ft 5 in (1.96 m)

Career information
- High school: Pearl (Nashville, Tennessee)
- College: Vanderbilt (1967–1970)
- NBA draft: 1970: 5th round, 80th overall pick
- Drafted by: Philadelphia 76ers
- Position: Small forward
- Number: 25

Career highlights
- Second-team All-SEC (1970); No. 25 retired by Vanderbilt; Second-team Parade All-American (1966)
- Stats at Basketball Reference

Perry Eugene Wallace Jr. (February 19, 1948 – December 1, 2017) was an American lawyer who was a professor of law at Washington College of Law. He was the first African-American varsity athlete to play basketball under an athletic scholarship in the Southeastern Conference, playing for Vanderbilt University. His experiences at Vanderbilt are the subject of the book Strong Inside, by Andrew Maraniss, published in 2014.

== Education ==
Wallace attended Pearl High School in the then segregated Nashville public schools. He helped Pearl High School's basketball team go undefeated and win the team's first integrated basketball state championship. He was a straight-A student, valedictorian of his class and was named a high school All-American athlete.

Wallace was recruited by many colleges, and enrolled at Vanderbilt in 1966. He was one of two African-American players who arrived at Vanderbilt that year, but the other, Godfrey Dillard, was injured before he could earn a varsity letter (at the time, freshmen were not eligible to play on NCAA varsity teams), and ultimately transferred to and played at Eastern Michigan. In 1967, Perry became the first black scholarship athlete to play basketball in the Southeastern Conference.

Wallace was generally welcomed by his teammates, but traveling with the team was difficult, and Wallace was often threatened from opposing teams with verbal taunts and roughness on the court. He became the first black athlete to complete four years at an SEC school, (Note: The aforementioned Northington, grieving over the death of Kentucky's other African-American signee of 1966, Greg Page, left UK shortly after his injury, transferring to Western Kentucky.) graduating with a degree in engineering in 1970, and was drafted by the Philadelphia 76ers. In 1970, he was awarded the Bachelor of Ugliness, a whimsically titled but prestigious student prize. He responded with a press interview in which he described some of the loneliness he had felt on campus throughout the four years, ranging from small slights and the lack of true inclusion by or friendship from well-meaning people to overtly racist professors and racist incidents, such as a demand from the University Church of Christ, located across the street from the campus but not affiliated with it, that he not attend church services there because of his race.

In the following season, basketball teams from Alabama, Kentucky, Florida and Georgia contained black athletes.

Wallace earned his J.D. from Columbia University in 1975.

== Career ==
Wallace was a trial attorney at the United States Department of Justice, where he dealt with natural resources and environmental law. In 1992, he was appointed to the Environmental Policy advisory council of the EPA. He became a professor of law at The American University Washington College of Law in 1993, where he specialized in environmental law, corporate law and finance.

== Honors ==
Wallace's #25 was retired by Vanderbilt in 2004

- 1966 – Recruited by many colleges and enrolled at Vanderbilt
- 2003 – Tennessee Sports Hall of Fame
- 2004 – Retirement of his Vanderbilt jersey, number 25
- 2017 – Movie was made about Perry Wallace's life called Triumph: The Untold Story of Perry Wallace –
- 2021 – The United States Basketball Writers Association renamed the men's version of its annual award for courage among figures associated with college basketball as the Perry Wallace Most Courageous Award.
