= Between Barack and a Hard Place =

2009 book by Tim Wise

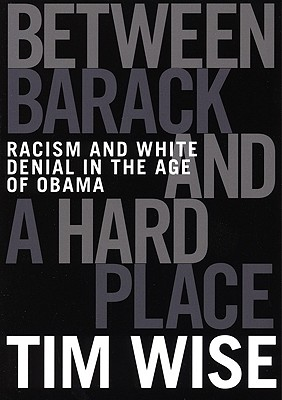
- Author: Tim Wise
- Language: English
- Subject: Barack Obama, racism in the United States
- Publisher: City Lights
- Publication date: 2009
- Publication place: United States
- Media type: Print
- Pages: 159
- ISBN: 978-0-87286-500-6
- OCLC: 261176371

Between Barack and a Hard Place: Racism and White Denial in the Age of Obama is a non-fiction book by the anti-racist writer and educator Tim Wise, published by City Lights in 2009.

In the book Wise argues that the election of Barack Obama did not signal the end of racism in America, writing that his political success could instead "deepen the denial in which so much of the white public has been embedded for generations."

== Critical reception ==
Adam Bradley from The Washington Post stated that "the punning title of [Wise's] book, Between Barack and a Hard Place, belies the sobering material within. Wise paints a stark picture of racial inequality in the United States today. ... Wise's short book reads like an old-school polemic: Thomas Paine's Common Sense for the 21st century. ... A post-racial United States is an imagined country." Referring to Wise's background as an educator, Media Mouse points to how Wise's book "continues the excellent work around the issue of White Privilege that Wise has pounded home in his books, articles, and public talks across the country."
