= Affirmative action bake sale =

Type of campus protest event

An affirmative action bake sale is a type of campus protest event used by student groups to performatively criticize affirmative action policies by charging students different prices depending on which social or racial group they belong to. It has also been used to raise awareness of racial or sexual wage gaps.

== Methodology ==
The bake sales offer to sell cookies at different prices depending on the customer's race and sex, imitating racial and sexual orientation practices of affirmative action. For example, one such bake sale at the University of New Mexico charged $1.50 for Asian customers, $1 for whites, and 50 cents for African-Americans and Hispanics.

According to one bake sale student leader, the goal of the technique is to "bring the issue of affirmative action down to everyday terms."

These bake sales have been organized at many schools across the U.S., sometimes annually. Affirmative action bake sales have also taken place at the University of Pretoria in South Africa, the latest (in 2008) having been forcibly broken up by campus security.

== Reception ==
The bake sales have met opposition, drawing crowds of students, sometimes facing opposition or restriction from campus administrations, often being accused of racism, and sometimes even being attacked. Additionally, some administrators have been accused of censorship and inappropriately advocating a political position.

Responding to an affirmative action bake sale being attacked at the University of Washington, the school's Board of Regents President Jerry Grinstein presented the opinion of many opponents of these events when he described "the statements [...] in putting on a bake sale about affirmative action were tasteless, divisive and hurtful to many members of the university community." The student leader of a bake sale at UCLA addressed this issue of divisiveness, saying "we wanted to show how affirmative action is racial division, not racial reconciliation." Similarly, administrators at Bucknell University claimed that the bake sales violated the private university's discrimination policy.

Other criticisms of the concept claim that these bake sales do not take into account ingrained social factors that favor white people. An opinion column in the Houston Chronicle after a similar sale took place at Texas A&M University held that "Actions like these reinforce the common misconception that affirmative action policies give academically unqualified minority students a get-into-college-free card, and they ignore historical discrimination that denied nonwhites opportunities to be successful at any price, no matter their talents or intelligence." The editorial also praised school officials for not shutting down the sale.

At the University of Illinois at Urbana–Champaign, the Graduate and Professional Students of Color student organization responded to a bake sale held by the Students for Individual Liberty by holding a White Privilege popcorn giveaway where white males received a full bag of popcorn, while women and non-whites received 1/3 of a bag.

== See also ==
- Affirmative action in the United States
- Reverse discrimination
- Whites Only Scholarship
- White privilege
- White backlash
