= White Like Me =

2007 book by Tim Wise

White Like me
- Author: Tim Wise
- Language: English
- Genre: Memoir
- Publisher: Soft Skull Press
- Publication date: 2007
- Publication place: United States
- Media type: Print
- Pages: 176
- ISBN: 978-1-933368-99-3
- OCLC: 183193527
- Dewey Decimal: 305.8/00973 22
- LC Class: E185.615 .W565 2008

White Like Me: Reflections on Race from a Privileged Son is a book by activist and writer Tim Wise. It is a personal account examining white privilege and his conception of racism in American society through his experiences with his family and in his community. The title is based on the book Black Like Me written by John Howard Griffin.

== Film adaptation ==
In 2013, the book was adapted into a documentary film. The film was financed through a successful Kickstarter campaign. Wise looks at the subject of ethnicity in the United States.
