= Matthew Heimbach =

American White supremacist (born 1991)

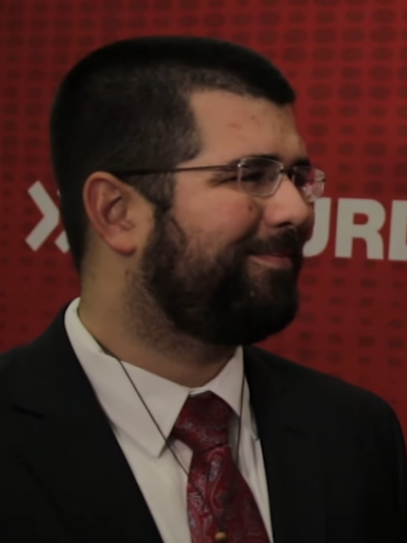
- Heimbach in 2015

Chairman of the Traditionalist Worker Party
- In office 2013–2018

Personal details
- Born: Matthew Warren Heimbach; April 8, 1991 (age 35) Poolesville, Maryland, U.S.
- Education: Towson University
- Known for: Traditionalist Worker Party; Unite the Right rally; White Student Union

Matthew Warren Heimbach (born April 8, 1991) is an American White supremacist and National Bolshevik. He has attempted to form alliances between several far-right extremist groups.

In May 2013, Heimbach and Matthew Parrott founded the Traditionalist Youth Network, which later morphed into the Traditionalist Worker Party (TWP), which ceased operation in March 2018. In 2018, Heimbach briefly served as community outreach director for the National Socialist Movement (NSM). In early 2020, Heimbach and Parrott once again began collaborating on projects such as the Global Minority Initiative, a "prisoner aid organization", and they publicly discussed a relaunching of the Traditionalist Worker Party.

On March 13, 2018, Heimbach was arrested in Paoli, Indiana, on charges of domestic battery arising from a domestic dispute. Before his arrest, Heimbach had assembled a community of neo-Nazis and anti-Jewish conspiracy theorists in a Paoli, Indiana trailer park. Heimbach was considered the leader of this community, and he had received media attention for his role in this regard, but he lost credibility following his arrest in 2018.

Heimbach is a defendant in the Sines v. Kessler lawsuit which was filed by Integrity First for America, the lawsuit claims that he and other organizers of the 2017 Unite the Right white supremacist rally in Charlottesville, Virginia, "planned and promoted violence against [a] protected group."

In 2017, in response to his racist beliefs and his violent actions, Heimbach was excommunicated from the Eastern Orthodox Church.

== Early life, education, and family ==
Heimbach was born in Poolesville, Maryland, a small rural town in Montgomery County. Heimbach's parents, Karl and Margaret Heimbach, are public school teachers whose political affiliation he describes as Mitt Romney-style Republicans. Heimbach says his views on race and immigration were formed early on by the writings of Pat Buchanan, especially his book The Death of the West, and particularly Buchanan's paleoconservative writing in American Renaissance. As early as his entrance to college, Towson University, he had begun to take in the writings of Jared Taylor, a self-described "race realist".

Heimbach met his former wife Brooke at an American Renaissance conference.

== Ideology ==
The Southern Poverty Law Center has commented that Heimbach is "considered by many to be the face of a new generation of white nationalists." According to the Counter Extremism Project, "Heimbach's platform is based around the idea that the white race has been disadvantaged because of globalism and multiculturalism, which he has largely blamed on a global Jewish conspiracy. Heimbach claims that white unity is necessary because the Jews hate all white people equally." To promote his anti-Semitism, Heimbach publicly supported terrorist organizations such as Hamas and Islamic Jihad writing that there should be "a unity between those who struggle against the Zionist State and International Jewry here in the West and those on the streets of Gaza, Syria, and Lebanon. We face the exact same enemy, one who doesn't care if they kill our women, children, and elderly. We are facing a truly Satanic enemy."

Heimbach has forged ties with nationalist groups from other countries, like Greece's far-right nationalist party Golden Dawn. As the leader of the Traditionalist Worker Party, Heimbach visited European far-right organizations in Germany, Slovakia, the Czech Republic, Romania, and Russia. The Russian Imperial Movement, an organization that was declared a Foreign Terrorist Organization by the United States Department of State in 2020, had extensive ties with Heimbach. Meetings between the Russian Imperial Movement and the Traditionalist Worker Party were called "the first time that we had a meeting on the U.S. soil of the American white nationalists and then the members of the Russian far right nationalist community." The United Kingdom government banned Heimbach from entering the country in October 2015 because his extremist rhetoric could incite violence. Heimbach has also voiced support for the North Korean government.

Heimbach called for the dissolution of the United States of America under the pretense of supporting self-determination for different ethnic and religious communities, going so far as to declare "Death to America." He stated that Americans should "stop fighting a culture war. Just declare both sides victors, and in your respective region, do what you think is best."

In 2014, Heimbach was photographed at a SlutWalk protest brandishing an Orthodox cross as a weapon against anti-racist protestors. In 2016, Heimbach was formally received into the Antiochian Orthodox Christian Archdiocese of North America. Following online circulation of the photos, Heimbach was excommunicated from the Church several weeks later. Following his excommunication, Heimbach received communion from a sympathetic noncanonical Romanian church.

Avowed anti-capitalism and anti-imperialism differentiated Heimbach and the Traditionalist Worker Party from many other American far-right groups. Heimbach stated that "For us, to be truly anti-capitalist is to be a nationalist. Nationalism is a bulwark against capitalist exploitation and globalism." Heimbach identified at the time as a Strasserist.

In April 2020, Heimbach published an open letter saying he was "pulling back" from the white nationalist movement. He has since clarified that his beliefs have not moderated, and has launched a website to fundraise for White nationalist and "National Socialist" prisoners. In July 2021, Heimbach announced his intention to reform the Traditionalist Worker Party along National Bolshevik lines.

As of 2023, he is a member of a group known as the Patriotic Socialist Front. Heimbach and the Patriotic Socialist Front appeared during the Rage Against the War Machine rally with a Soviet flag. The group aligns itself with the National Bolshevik movements.

== Far-right involvement ==
The Traditionalist Youth Network (TYN) was established in May 2013 by Matthew Heimbach with Matt Parrott as an offshoot of a "White Student Union" which was active on the Towson University campus.

In January 2015, the TYN established the Traditionalist Worker Party (TWP) as its political party prior to the 2016 elections, and a small group of candidates from the far-right ran under its banner. The party stated that it stood against "economic exploitation, federal tyranny, and anti-Christian degeneracy". The Traditionalist Worker Party promoted itself as being a working-class and "left-leaning" neo-Nazi organization more akin to the original Sturmabteilung than more common far-right ideological beliefs of most post-war white supremacists. The Southern Poverty Law Center, which tracks extremist groups, designated the Traditionalist Worker Party as a hate group. The group went dormant in March 2018 following Heimbach's arrest but has begun a relaunch as of July 2021.

Following the model of other white supremacists such as George Lincoln Rockwell and Richard B. Spencer, Heimbach organized speaking engagements at American universities, causing mass protests by both students and community members. Heimbach is alleged to have met with Republican Party strategists and operatives in January 2017 during the inauguration of Donald Trump.

On January 8, 2021, Chicago's NPR radio station WBEZ reported that Heimbach had participated in an attempted coup at the United States Capitol on January 6, 2021. The caption to WBEZ's photo of insurrectionists confronting U.S. Capitol Police outside the Senate chamber identified "Neo-Nazi Matthew Heimbach (second from left wearing a blue mask)." However, WBEZ later amended its story with an editor's note including Heimbach's denial and his assertion that he was in Tennessee with his family on January 6. In its update, WBEZ removed Heimbach's name from their photo caption. Also on January 8, Fox News identified Heimbach as having been "captured posing for photographs" during the January 6 siege of the U.S. Capitol. Fox News subsequently deleted that story and ran another by the same reporter, stating that "social media posts" had suggested Heimbach "took part in Wednesday's storming of the U.S. Capitol," but not mentioning Fox's own, withdrawn article to that effect. On January 8, Mashable reported that "there is no proof that Heimbach was at the Capitol" on January 6. Brian McCreary, a resident of Massachusetts, was arrested in February 2021 for his participation in the January 6th protest and was identified by police as the individual who had previously been mistaken for Heimbach.

== Lawsuits and criminal convictions ==
In July 2017, Heimbach pleaded guilty to second-degree disorderly conduct for an incident when he repeatedly pushed an anti-Trump protester at a Donald Trump campaign rally in Louisville, Kentucky. He received a suspended prison sentence, a fine, and an order to attend anger management classes. In 2018, Heimbach was sentenced to 38 days in the Louisville jail for violating the terms of his probation.

=== Sines v. Kessler lawsuit ===
In October 2017, Heimbach was listed as a defendant in Sines v. Kessler, the federal civil lawsuit against various organizers, promoters, and participants of the 2017 Unite the Right rally. The trial began on October 25, 2021, and the jury reached a verdict on November 23. Heimbach and all other defendants were found liable for civil conspiracy under Virginia state law, and ordered to pay $500,000 in punitive damages. The jury were deadlocked on the two other claims pertaining to Heimbach, which argued he and other defendants had engaged in a federal conspiracy to commit racially motivated violence.
