= WSU =

WSU may refer to:

== Universities ==
=== United States ===
- Washington State University in Pullman, Washington
- Wayne State University in Detroit, Michigan
- Weber State University in Ogden, Utah
- Western State University in Fullerton, California
- Westfield State University in Westfield, Massachusetts
- Wichita State University in Wichita, Kansas
- Winona State University in Winona, Minnesota
- Wisconsin State Universities (13 campuses)
- Worcester State University in Worcester, Massachusetts
- Wright State University in Dayton, Ohio

=== Africa ===
- Walter Sisulu University in Mthatha, South Africa
- Wolaita Sodo University in Wolaita, Ethiopia

=== Australia ===
- Western Sydney University in Sydney, Australia

== Transport ==
- West Sutton railway station, London, National Rail station code
- Amtrak code for station location Wausau, Wisconsin

== Other ==
- Waikato Students' Union, a student union at the University of Waikato, New Zealand
- White Student Union, organisation in Towson, Maryland, United States
- Women Superstars United, a professional wrestling company
