= End This Depression Now! =

- Hardcover edition
- Author: Paul Krugman
- Language: English
- Subject: Great Recession
- Genre: Nonfiction
- Publisher: W. W. Norton & Company
- Publication date: 2012
- Publication place: United States
- Media type: Print (Hardcover), audiobook paperback edition with a new preface January 2013
- Pages: 272
- ISBN: 978-0393088779

End This Depression Now! is a non-fiction book by the American economist Paul Krugman. The book is intended for a general audience and was published by W. W. Norton & Company in April 2012. Krugman has presented his book at the London School of Economics, on fora.tv, and elsewhere.

== Premise ==
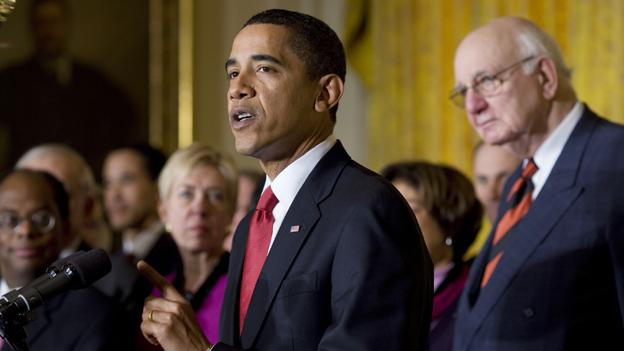
President Barack Obama announces the creation of the Economic Recovery Advisory Board on February 6, 2009.

Krugman states explicitly in the early sections of the book,

But the essential point is that what we really need to get out of this current depression is another burst of government spending. Is it really that simple? Would it really be that easy? Basically, yes.

The author views the book as delivering a call for stimulative expansionary policy and an end to austerity. It points out that existing historical economic data demonstrate: fiscal cuts and austerity measures just deprive the economy of precious funds that can circulate and add to a poor economy. If there is large unemployment, there cannot be sufficient consumption. Under poor consumption people are unable to spend and markets cannot thrive. Krugman disputes that although it is necessary to cut debt, it is the worst moment to do so at the time when an economy has just suffered severe financial shocks. It must be done when an economy is full-employed and the private sector can endure the burden of decreased government spending and austerity. Failure to stimulate the economy by public or private sectors will just unnecessarily lengthen the current economic depression and make it worse.

Krugman writes about the anti-recession efforts from the Obama White House that he "personally was more or less tearing my hair out in public as the shape of the administration's plan began to come clear." He describes having "feared that an inadequate stimulus would both fail to produce adequate recovery and undermine the political case for further action", with the enacted Recovery and Reinvestment Act being far too small to respond to the depth of the economic crisis in his view.

He cites the growth of government spending and economic regulations as the U.S. began in its involvement in World War II as key evidence for his argument. He writes, "As military spending created jobs and family incomes rose, consumer spending also picked up (it would eventually be restrained by rationing, but that came later). As businesses saw their sales growing, they also responded by ramping up spending. And just like that, the Depression was over."

== Reviews ==
Kirkus Reviews published a positive review saying that Krugman "delivers an urgent message on ending the economic crisis." The group's review also referred to the book as an "important contribution to the current study of economics and a reason for hope that effective solutions will be implemented again."

The Ludwig von Mises Institute published a highly critical review in its online journal Mises Daily by David Gordon. Gordon wrote, "The government under Bush and Obama has spent a great deal of money; but, on Krugman's own showing, the economy has failed fully to recover. Does this not give us some reason to think that the Keynesian prescription is inadequate?" He stated that Krugman makes a 'heads I win, tails you lose' argument in which Krugman credits instances that government spending seems to stop economic malaise while instances when government spending seems to fail get hand-waived away since Krugman believes even greater spending would have worked.

== See also ==
- Great Recession
- American Recovery and Reinvestment Act of 2009
- Keynesian economics
- The New New Deal
