= Whites Only Scholarship =

Parody scholarship

The Whites Only Scholarship was founded in 2004 by Jason Mattera, a Hispanic Roger Williams University student and member of the school Republican Party. The scholarship was a proposal to parody and highlight what Mattera perceives as inequity and unfairness of racial preferences at his school and other educational institutions in America. While a parody, it was still executed. The winner, architecture major Tony Capriccio, was awarded a cash award. Mattera himself is of Puerto Rican descent and received a $5,000 scholarship open only to a minority group.

== Reasons ==
Mattera argues that he supports private organizations such as the Hispanic College Fund, The United Negro College Fund, and other groups that are privately funded and ethnically-based that award scholarships to members of their own communities, a position he claims is fully in line with freedom of association. However, he is opposed to federally subsidized institutions creating two classes of persons by imposing different standards on them. Either such universities should compile race-based scholarships for all students, or they should award scholarships on the basis of merit alone, he writes.

Roger Williams University chapter of the College Republicans (RWUCR) was condemned by Rhode Island's Republican Party and were no longer allowed to use a capital "R" in their name. The group still used the "R" in defiance. The student who won the scholarship donated the prize money to those affected by the 2003 Station Nightclub Fire.

== Similar scholarships ==
=== KOPSES ===
A similar scholarship was offered two months later at the University of Missouri by Colin Kerr, a sophomore. While Kerr consulted with Mattera before the release of the scholarship, he maintains it was an independent project planned months before the release of scholarship at Roger Williams. Under the auspices of a group called the Kerr-Otis Partnership for Socio-Economic Scholarships (KOPSES), Kerr echoed similar arguments to that of Mattera, though his scholarship eligibility requirement of 1/8 European-American descent mirrored that of the University of Missouri's criteria for minority status.

Furthermore, before the announcement of the scholarship Kerr brokered a deal between both the leaders of the liberal and conservative campus publications to remain neutral in their coverage. The essay contest asked students to describe "how their European-American heritage affected their view of race-based scholarships." An Asian-American student, whose essay detailed a history of discrimination by his Asian relatives for being partially Caucasian, was awarded the scholarship.

Kerr's KOPSES organization eventually received wide multi-party support and later morphed into the American-Coalition for Socio-Economic Scholarships (ACSES), a short-lived national awareness group that lasted for over a year until its original funding ran short of its operating costs.

=== CARS ===
The trend in more sophisticated race-based scholarship protests continued when a white scholarship was offered at Boston University, known as the Caucasian Achievement and Recognition Scholarship. Similar to the KOPSES scholarship, the CARS scholarship required applicants to have at least 1/4 Caucasian heritage and although it required a photograph, did not specify that the photograph would be used as proof of race (since partially Caucasian applicants can apply).

=== Columbia University ===
In 2013, a court affidavit filed by JPMorgan Chase revealed a graduate-student scholarship fund at Columbia University given only to persons of the Caucasian race. This scholarship, which was established in 1920, has been reportedly awarding aid for 77 years and was valued at $840,000. The university has temporarily stopped it, hence the JPMorgan Chase affidavit, requesting it to be struck down. According to school administrators, they willfully overlooked racial restrictions when awarding the scholarship but did not specify if the scholarship was ever given to a person of color. Recipients were also unaware of the race requirements.

== See also ==
- Affirmative action bake sale
- Identity politics
- White Student Union
