= Once in a Great City: A Detroit Story =

2015 book by David Maraniss

- Author: David Maraniss
- Language: English
- Subject: Culture of Detroit; Government of Detroit; History of Detroit
- Published: Simon & Schuster
- Publication place: United States
- Pages: 409
- ISBN: 9781476748382
- OCLC: 894936463

Once in a Great City: A Detroit Story is a 2015 non-fiction book discussing the history of the U.S. city of Detroit, Michigan, that was published by Simon & Schuster, focusing on the period between late 1962 to early 1964. Written by Pulitzer Prize-winning journalist David Maraniss, a Detroit native, it delves into socio-political topics such as the Civil Rights Movement, labor union organization, and the rise of the soul music label Motown. Significant emphasis is also placed on biographical details of prominent Midwestern figures; for example, the author describes Henry Ford II "impeccably dressed yet with a touch of the peasant, with his manicured nails and beer gut and carefree proclivities, his frat-boy party demeanor and head full of secrets."

Favorable reviews appeared in publications such as The Seattle Times and the Star Tribune.

== Background and contents ==
Journalist David Maraniss previously authored biographies of public figures such as Bill Clinton, Al Gore, and Barack Obama. The Pulitzer Prize-winning writer is a Detroit native himself. He felt particularly inspired due to the cultural resonance of the popular "this the Motor City" Chrysler commercial during the 2011 Super Bowl.

Once in a Great City focuses on the city's socio-economic success during an about 18-month period from late 1962 to early 1964. He states that while negative trends would turn the location into a "city of decay" decades later, he still "wanted to illuminate a moment in time when Detroit seemed to be glowing with promise". Detroit's influence on the broader U.S. culture is emphasized in multiple ways; for example, Presidents John F. Kennedy and Lyndon B. Johnson maintained important ties with the city's Democratic politics.

Racial conflict and struggles on behalf of the Civil Rights Movement are a major theme of the book. While largely beneficial economic growth helped build the American middle class in the city, its booming automotive businesses having large effects across the nation, at the same time "there was not a single car dealership in the United States with black ownership". Signs of Detroit's eventual decline exist in multiple instances, particularly given the tension among black leaders over non-violent, equality-based approaches and that of violent confrontation.

Maraniss particularly points out that sociologists at Wayne State University predicted in 1963 that Detroit's population would drop by a third and keep falling in the next decade. The academics forecast that both black and whites residents of the middle to upper classes would take advantage of Detroit's transportation infrastructure to head for suburbs. Thus, a growing segment left behind would be those that "suffer from relatively great housing, educational and general economic deprivations".

== Reviews and responses ==
The Star Tribune published a supportive review of the book by writer Susan Ager, who stated that as a Detroit native herself she nodded "in recognition throughout" it, "remembering and learning on every densely detailed page". Praise also came from The Seattle Times. However, given the author's "articulate writing" and other strengths, the publication's review commented, "Maraniss says he’ll leave to others the analysis of why the city had such a precipitous decline... [but] reading the detailed and startling contrast he draws between then and now, it’s impossible not to wish he had delved more deeply into the reasons why."

== See also ==
- Culture of Detroit
- Government of Detroit
- History of Detroit
- Timeline of Detroit
