= White Student Union (Towson University) =

Unaffiliated organization at Towson University

- Abbreviation: WSU
- Formation: 2012
- Type: Youth activist group
- Legal status: Active
- Location: Towson, Maryland
- Region served: Towson University
- Official language: English
- President: Matthew Heimbach
- Affiliations: White nationalism
- Website: towsonwsu.blogspot.com

The White Student Union (WSU) was an unaffiliated white supremacist organization founded in Towson, Maryland by Matthew Heimbach, at the time a Towson University student. The group advocated for what it sees as the interests of "persons of European heritage". It has been listed as a hate group by the Southern Poverty Law Center and the Anti-Defamation League. The organization rejected this label, stating in a blog post that "We do not hate any other race and we do not wish anyone harm". In May 2013 Heimbach said that the group would merge with the Traditionalist Youth Network which Heimbach described as an effort to build "a wide coalition of Kinist, social conservatives, Traditionalist Christians, believers in Right-wing politics, and other factions of the pro-white movement."

Heimbach continued to be active in white supremacist politics after graduating from Towson in 2013.

== History ==
The group's existence caused a series of nationally reported controversies and accusations of promoting racial bigotry and white supremacy. It invited self-described "racial realist" Jared Taylor to speak at one of its meetings, which attracted an attendance of nearly 250. Heimbach said he started the group because of "a culture of crime where primarily it's nonwhites doing it to white students and we perpetually have to live in a system of victimhood." He also said "We'd also want to create a safe space for members who have filed hate/bias reports and who have had anti-white language used against them....Especially the female members who have heard 'cracker' and 'honkie,' and nothing has ever come of it. It’s a support network for a campus that is hostile toward white students."

The White Student Union sought but failed to get official recognition by the college, arguing that the college needed to officially recognize the group in order to show that it does not discriminate against white students. A change.org petition was circulated urging the campus not to recognize a "whites only" group. The organization noted in a press release that the petition was based on the false assumption that the WSU would be a "whites only" group, despite the statement on the WSU website that "the organization invites people of all races, colors, and creeds to join together to celebrate European culture."

== Activism ==
The WSU received national attention for participating in community watch programs to "raise awareness" about violent crime that is primarily directed at the majority-white student body. Heimbach said that "the goal is not to go out and intimidate, the goal is not to go out and prove something, the goal is just to be an extra set of eyes and ears for the [Towson] community at large." Organizations like the Southern Poverty Law Center and the Anti-Defamation League condemned these patrols as being racially motivated. The Southern Poverty Law Center said that the patrols were "a fairly obvious allusion, it appears, to the terroristic role of the Ku Klux Klan during Reconstruction."

== Earlier examples ==
A 1990 article in the Chronicle of Higher Education mentions a number of white student unions created at the time to oppose racial integration and affirmative action; two of the unions obtained official recognition from their colleges.

== Hoaxes ==
In 2015, Facebook pages appeared announcing "White Student Unions" at over 25 major United States colleges. These pages were all hoaxes; the groups in question did not actually exist.

== See also ==
- Whites Only Scholarship
- Youth for Western Civilization
- Kinism
