= The Promise: President Obama, Year One =

2010 book by Jonathan Alter

- Author: Jonathan Alter
- Language: English
- Publisher: Simon & Schuster
- Publication date: 2010
- Publication place: United States
- Media type: Print (hardcover & paperback)
- Pages: 458 pages
- ISBN: 978-1-4391-0119-3

The Promise: President Obama, Year One is a book by Jonathan Alter describing US President Barack Obama's first year in office. In The Promise, Alter describes the many challenges the Obama administration faced in its first year: a troubled economy, passing health care reform, and the War in Afghanistan. Alter discusses the ability of the White House to avoid another Great Depression and accomplish many of Obama's campaign promises, yet still fail to effectively communicate their impact to the American public.
