= Ray Griggs (director) =

American film director and producer

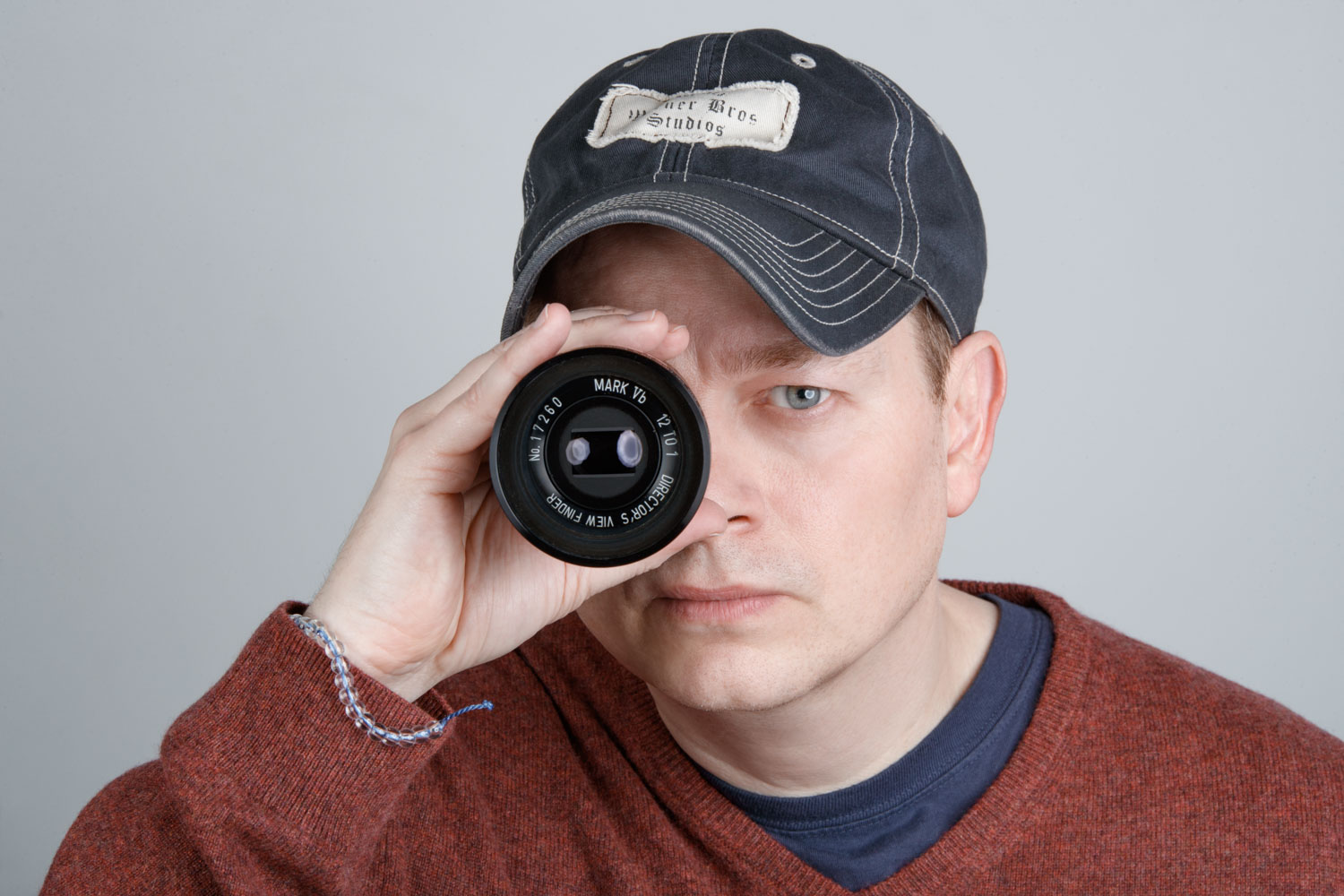
- Born: April 24, 1974 (age 52)

Ray Griggs is a director, writer and producer in Hollywood, California, and owner of RG Entertainment, Ltd. His work has won several awards.

== Career ==
His 2009 project, Super Capers, a family comedy about an ordinary person joining a host of low-key superheroes, stars Tom Sizemore, Doug Jones and Christine Lakin.

Griggs is also known for creating an 8-minute film short Lucifer about the Biblical account of the fallen angel and subsequent War in Heaven. The award-winning short starred Jason Lewis as Lucifer and Bru Muller as the archangel Michael.

In 2010, Griggs filmed the conservative documentary about socialism and the role of government in society entitled I Want Your Money. The film, released October 15 nationwide, features interviews with economists, conservative personalities and government officials.

In 2021, Griggs debut an action-adventure thriller "Jack Sterling and the Spear of Destiny self-published through his RG Entertainment company.

== Awards ==
- 2007 Beverly Hills Film Festival Best Animation
- 2007 Fort Lauderdale Film Festival Audience Choice Award for Short
- 2007 Accolade for Lucifer Short
- 2007 Silver Telly Award for Lucifer Short
- 2021 Silver Winner NYX Marcom Awards for Jack Sterling & the Spear of Destiny

== Controversy ==
On November 12, 2009, it was reported that Apple rejected Griggs' iPhone application which enabled the user to contact every U.S. Congressman or Senator based on GPS coordinates. The application also featured animated bobblehead caricatures of each representative. A caricature of U.S. Congresswoman Nancy Pelosi was deemed "objectionable" and among the reasons for rejection. On Nov. 14, amid rising controversy, Apple reversed its decision and approved the application for its online store.
