= I Want Your Money =

- Theatrical release poster
- Directed by: Ray Griggs
- Written by: Randall Norman Desoto; Ray Griggs
- Produced by: Michael Kim Binder; Ray Griggs; Doug Stebleton
- Cinematography: Matthew Mayotte
- Edited by: Jessica Graeme Lowry
- Music by: Don L. Harper
- Production company: RG Entertainment
- Distributed by: Freestyle Releasing
- Release date: July 28, 2010
- Running time: 92 minutes
- Country: United States
- Language: English
- Budget: $400,000
- Box office: $433,000

I Want Your Money is a 2010 American documentary film by filmmaker Ray Griggs. It contrasts Barack Obama to Ronald Reagan.

== Premise ==
The film examines and contrasts the differences between "Reaganomics" and "Obamanomics" as American economic and governmental policies, as well as their respective impact on life in the United States of America, as summarized from film's official web site:

Two versions of the American dream now stand in sharp contrast. One views the money you earned as yours and best allocated by you. It champions the traditional American dream, which has played out millions of times through generations of Americans, of improving one's lot in life and the entrepreneurial spirit of daring to dream and to build big. The other believes that the federal government, using taxpayers' money, should play a major role in leveling out the nation's wealth to guarantee outcomes to all, regardless of effort. How America chooses between these two views of the role of government, at this crucial juncture, will have everything to do with the future we and our children and our children's children will enjoy.

The film uses computer animation, film clips, archival footage, dramatizations, music, graphics, and on-camera interviews with well-known public figures and experts "to tell the story in the plainest terms of the choice between the Obama and the Reagan views of the role of the federal government in our society."

== Interviews ==
The following individuals were interviewed for I Want Your Money:

- Gary Bauer
- Kenneth Blackwell
- Andrew Breitbart
- Chris Edwards
- Lee Edwards
- Steve Forbes
- Alison Fraser^{[unfit]}
- Newt Gingrich
- Mike Huckabee
- Allen Icet
- Tom McClintock
- Thad McCotter
- David M. McIntosh
- Edwin Meese lll
- Stephen Moore
- Kate Obenshain
- Star Parker
- Michael Reagan
- Lila Rose
- George Runner
- Rob Schaaf
- John Stossel
- William Voegeli
- Pete Wilson

== Voice Cast ==
There are three animated sketches in the film parodying several American politicians.

- Jay Lament as Barack Obama
- Tim Russell as Ronald Reagan and Bill Clinton
- Christopher Cox as Jimmy Carter
- Bill Farmer as George H. W. Bush and George W. Bush
- Jim Meskimen as Richard Nixon
- Cindy Robinson as Hillary Clinton and Nancy Pelosi
- Jane Wilson as Sarah Palin
- Mick Wingert as Arnold Schwarzenegger
- Ray Griggs as squirrels

== Release ==
The film had a limited release on October 15, 2010 in 537 theater screens, with an opening weekend box office of $249,428 USD in North American rentals.

== Reception ==
I Want Your Money holds a critical rating score of 13% based on 8 reviews at Rotten Tomatoes.

Joe Leydon of Variety magazine called it "Equal parts hagiography and hatchet job."
