= The Obama Story =

2009 manwha written by T. S. Lee

The Obama Story: The Boy with the Biggest Dream!
- Author: T. S. Lee
- Translator: Janet J. Shin
- Language: Korean
- Genre: Biography, Juvenile audience
- Publisher: Seoul: Dasan Books; Englewood Cliffs, N.J: Joyful Stories Press
- Publication place: Korea
- English publication date: 2009
- Media type: Print
- Pages: 201 pp
- ISBN: 0-9819542-0-0

The Obama Story: The Boy with the Biggest Dream! (Korean: 오바마 이야기: 세상에서 가장 큰 꿈을 꾼 아이) is a manhwa that is a biography of Barack Obama. T. S. Lee wrote and illustrated the book. Janet Jaywan Shin created the English translation from the original Korean. In the U.S., J.E Chae and Brittany Pogue-Mohammed edited that country's version.

Dasan Books, a Korean publisher, published the story under the U.S. imprint Joyful Stories Press, an imprint for younger readers. The Obama Story was scheduled for release in the U.S. in English on April 21, 2009. The book covers Obama from his childhood to the 2008 U.S. Presidential Election. The publication of the book was later delayed.
