= Michael Grunwald =

American writer and journalist

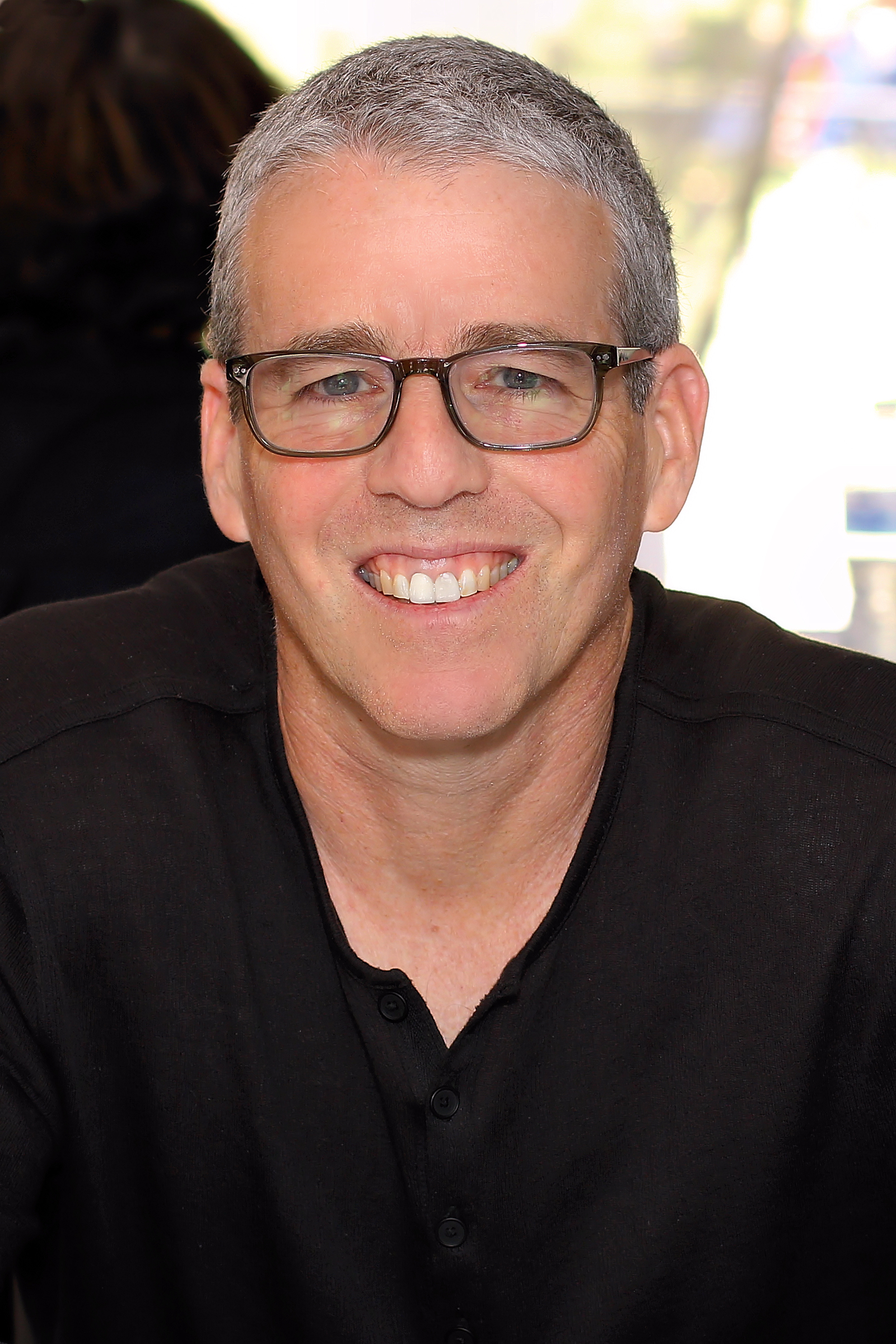
- Grunwald at the 2025 Texas Book Festival
- Born: August 16, 1970 (age 56)
- Education: Harvard University (AB)
- Occupation: Journalist
- Notable work: The Swamp: The Everglades, Florida and the Politics of Paradise (2007); The New New Deal: The Hidden Story of Change in the Obama Era (2012)
- Children: 2

Michael Grunwald (born August 16, 1970) is an American journalist and author who covers public policy and national politics. A senior writer for Politico Magazine, he previously worked as a reporter for The Boston Globe, The Washington Post and Time.

Grunwald is the author of three widely acclaimed books: The Swamp: The Everglades, Florida and the Politics of Paradise (2006); The New New Deal: The Hidden Story of Change in the Obama Era (2012); and We Are Eating the Earth (2025), which is about food, land-use and climate change.

== Early life and career ==
=== Education and occupation ===
Grunwald attended Harvard University, where he wrote for The Harvard Crimson and graduated with a Bachelor of Arts in government in 1992. He started his career as a metro reporter for The Boston Globe, then joined The Washington Post, where he served as a national reporter, New York bureau chief and outlook essayist; he wrote the Washington Post's lead news story on the September 11 attacks. In 2007, he became a senior national correspondent for Time, where he wrote cover stories on topics like the future of California, the decline of the Republican Party, and 2009 Person of the Year Ben Bernanke. His cover story about the policy roots of the Hurricane Katrina disaster won a $50,000 award from the Understanding Government Foundation; he donated the award to New Orleans charities.

Grunwald joined Politico Magazine in 2014, where he helped start the public policy site The Agenda. He has mostly written at Politico Magazine about wonky topics like the federal government's dysfunctional $3 trillion portfolio of credit programs, the failure of U.S. transportation policy and President Obama's policy legacy. He has also written longform political stories about the 2016 campaign, America's political culture wars, and the growth of Trumpism through the Florida retirement community The Villages.

=== Books ===
Grunwald wrote his first book, The Swamp: The Everglades, Florida, and the Politics of Paradise (2007) after doing a four-part series for The Washington Post in 2002. It is the story of man and nature on the Florida peninsula, focusing on the steady destruction and troubled attempted restoration of the Everglades, and is still considered one of the indispensable histories of Florida. Grunwald also wrote the foreword to the Marjory Stoneman Douglas classic about the Everglades, River of Grass.

Grunwald's next book was The New New Deal: The Hidden Story of Change in the Obama Era (2012). A New York Times best-seller, it is the inside story of the Obama administration and its response to the 2008 financial crisis. Grunwald describes the discussions and debates that led to the government's anti-recession measures, such as the American Recovery and Reinvestment Act of 2009. Taking a positive view of Obama's efforts, Grunwald defends the economic measures as full of important, long-term investments while charging Republican Party opponents as being hypocritical and self-serving.

In 2025, Grunwald's third book, We Are Eating the Earth, about food production and its effects on the environment, was released to good reviews. The book was a finalist for the 2026 New York Public Library’s Helen Bernstein Book Award for Excellence in Journalism.

== Personal life ==
Raised in Greenvale, New York, Grunwald resides in Miami Beach, Florida with his wife, Cristina Dominguez, a lawyer who is now the executive director of Sai Ayurvedic Institute, and their two children.
