= Obama Zombies =

2010 book written by Jason Mattera

Obama Zombies: How the Liberal Machine Brainwashed My Generation
- Author: Jason Mattera
- Language: English
- Publisher: Threshold Editions
- Publication date: March 23, 2010
- Media type: Print hardcover
- ISBN: 1-4391-7207-2

Obama Zombies: How the Liberal Machine Brainwashed My Generation is a book written by Jason Mattera. Published in 2010 by Simon & Schuster, the book purports to reveal methods that Barack Obama's 2008 presidential campaign used to organize or mislead young voters.

== Content ==
The official summary of the book begins: "For an entire year, otherwise clear-thinking members of the most affluent, over-educated, information-drenched generation in American history fell prey to the most expensive, hi-tech, laser-focused marketing assault in presidential campaign history." According to publisher Simon & Schuster, Mattera "reveals the jaw-dropping lengths Barack Obama and his allies in Hollywood, Washington, and Academia went to in order to transform a legion of iPod-listening, MTV-watching followers into a winning coalition that threatens to become a long-lasting political realignment."

== Reception ==
Stephen Gutowski at Human Events, for which Mattera is editor, praised the book, which he said "well chronicles how liberals have taken advantage of and brain-washed" college-aged voters. On broadcast media, Mattera was a guest on the Fox News Channel program Hannity and radio programs The David Pakman Show The Thom Hartmann Program.

Media Matters for America, a progressive media watchdog group, published two articles critical of Obama Zombies: one that disputes Mattera's claim that Obama labels himself as "apologizer in chief" and another claiming that Mattera used questionable sources and information to criticize the scientific opinion on climate change.

== Bestseller list ==
Obama Zombies reached #14 on The New York Times Best Seller list for hardcover non-fiction, covering the week ending April 3.
