= Colorblind (book) =

2010 book by Tim Wise

Colorblind: The Rise of Post-Racial Politics and the Retreat from Racial Equity
- Author: Tim Wise
- Language: English
- Publisher: City Lights
- Publication date: 2010
- Publication place: United States
- Media type: Print
- Pages: 160
- ISBN: 978-0-87286-508-2

Colorblind: The Rise of Post-Racial Politics and the Retreat from Racial Equity is a non-fiction book by the anti-racist writer and educator Tim Wise, and is published by City Lights.

== Critical reception ==
Reviewing the book, Kel Munger from the Sacramento News and Review states that "Tim Wise dismantles the myth that full equality has been won and the playing field is level with hard facts, citing studies that have shown the persistence of institutional racism and white racial preference in all areas, including employment, education and health care." In another review from AnnArbor.com, La'Ron Williams highlights Wise's attempts at addressing contemporary concerns: "Focusing on disparities in four key areas--employment, education, healthcare, and housing--and drawing upon a wide range of academic studies, Wise pulls back the veil from the face of contemporary 'invisible' racism. He also, simultaneously, points out the ways that so-called 'colorblind' social policies--those which are based on programs meant to 'lift all boats' by raising the overall economic water level for working class and poor people--will actually worsen the problems of racial injustice."
