= Media Mouse =

Media group

Media Mouse was a Grand Rapids, Michigan independent media group founded in 1999. In 2004 the group's primary focus shifted to providing regular news coverage of "progressive" movements for social change in Grand Rapids that were posted online via its website, www.mediamouse.org. Media Mouse ceased production in 2009. It described its goals in its mission statement:

"Media Mouse is an independent media collective that works to provide independent news pertaining to Grand Rapids and the world. Wherever possible, Media Mouse aims to draw links between national and local issues and between movements for social change. In turn, it is hoped that this news will be a catalyst for action and will help spur organizing for social change."

Materials from the site have been permanently archived at https://mediamousearchive.wordpress.com/.

== Resources ==
In addition its news coverage, Media Mouse offered a variety of additional resources including databases and special subject areas:

- "The Far Right in West Michigan" Database
- Progressive Directory of Western Michigan
- Grand Rapids Military Contracts Database
- Calendar of Social Change Oriented Events in West Michigan

== The Bloom Collective ==
In June 2007, Media Mouse became involved in The Bloom Collective, an infoshop located at 8 Jefferson SE in Grand Rapids, Michigan.

In addition to lending books and videos, the Bloom Collective also served as a meeting place for mediated community discussions on various radical topics and strategies for change.
