= Tim Wise =

American anti-racism activist (born 1968)

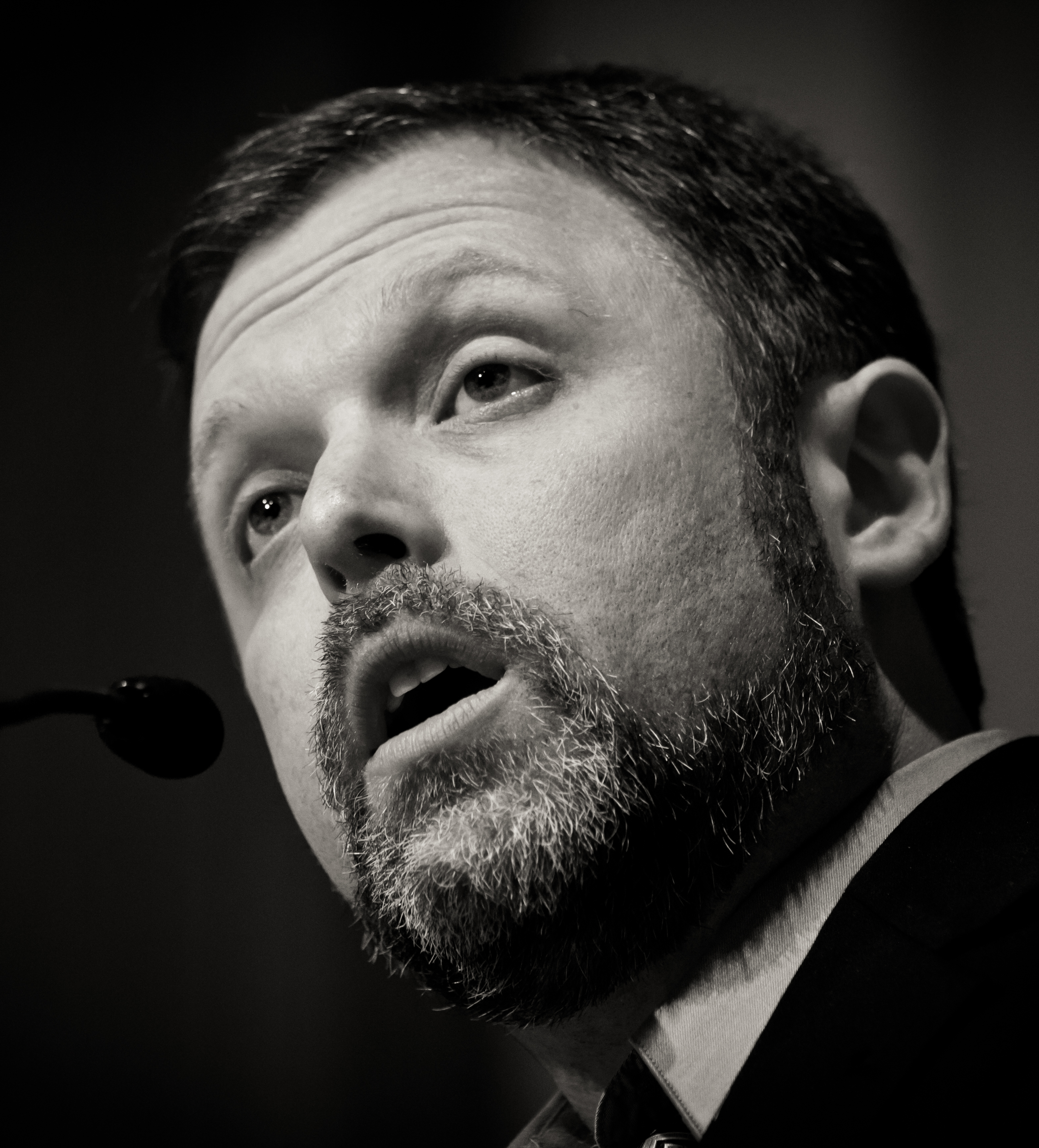
- Wise in 2011
- Born: Timothy Jacob Wise; October 4, 1968 (age 58); Nashville, Tennessee, U.S.
- Education: B.A., Political Science
- Alma mater: Tulane University
- Occupations: Anti-racism activist, writer
- Children: 2
- Website: timwise.org

Timothy Jacob Wise (born October 4, 1968) is an American activist and writer on the topic of race. He is a consultant who provides anti-racism lectures to institutions.

== Early life and education ==
Wise was born in Nashville, Tennessee, to Michael Julius Wise and LuCinda Anne (née McLean) Wise. His paternal grandfather was Jewish (of Russian origin). The rest of his ancestry is mostly northern European, including some Scottish. Wise has said that when he was about 12 years old, his synagogue was attacked by white supremacists.

Wise attended public schools in Nashville, graduating from Hillsboro High School in 1986. Wise has a BA from Tulane University in New Orleans. He majored in Political Science and minored in Latin American Studies. While a student, he was a leader in the campus anti-apartheid movement, which sought to force Tulane to divest from companies still doing business with the government of South Africa. His anti-apartheid activism was first brought to national attention in 1988, when South African Archbishop Desmond Tutu announced he would turn down an offer of an honorary degree from Tulane after Wise's group informed him of the school's ongoing investments there.

== Career ==
After graduating from Tulane in 1990, Wise started working as an anti-racism activist after receiving training from the New Orleans–based People's Institute for Survival and Beyond. Wise began initially as a youth coordinator, and then associate director, of the Louisiana Coalition Against Racism and Nazism, the largest of the various organizations founded for the purpose of defeating political candidate David Duke when Duke ran for U.S. Senate in 1990 and Governor of Louisiana in 1991. After his work campaigning against David Duke, Wise worked for a number of community-based organizations and political groups in Baton Rouge and New Orleans, including the Louisiana Coalition for Tax Justice, the Louisiana Injured Worker's Union and Agenda for Children. Later in the 1990s, Wise began lecturing around the country on the issues of racism, criticizing white privilege (his own included), and defending affirmative action.

From 1999 to 2003, Wise was an advisor to the Fisk University Race Relations Institute. Wise argues that racism in the United States is institutionalized due to past overt racism (and its ongoing effects) along with current-day discrimination. Although he concedes that personal, overt bias is less common than in the past (or at least less openly articulated), Wise argues that existing institutions continue to foster and perpetuate white privilege, and that subtle, impersonal, and even ostensibly race-neutral policies contribute to racism and racial inequality today. Wise starred in a 2013 documentary entitled White Like Me, based on the book by Wise of the same name.

== Personal life ==
After living in New Orleans for ten years, Wise relocated to his native Nashville in 1996. He married in 1998 and has two children. Wise considers himself Jewish by heritage and ethnicity, but does not practice Judaism as a religion. He is a critic of Israel, and philosophically opposed to Zionism, which he views as not only oppressive to non-Jews in Palestine, but detrimental to Jews as well and counter to Jewish values.

== Written works ==
- White Like Me: Reflections on Race From a Privileged Son (Soft Skull Press, 2004) ISBN 978-1-59376-425-8
- Affirmative Action: Racial Preference in Black and White (Routledge, 2005) ISBN 978-0-41595-049-7
- Speaking Treason Fluently: Anti-Racist Reflections From an Angry White Male (Soft Skull Press, 2008) ISBN 978-1-59376-207-0
- "The Pathology of Privilege: Racism" (PDF). Media Education Foundation. 2008. Archived from the original on October 9, 2009.
- Between Barack and a Hard Place: Racism and White Denial in the Age of Obama (City Lights Publishers, 2009) ISBN 978-0-87286-500-6.
- Colorblind: The Rise of Post-Racial Politics and the Retreat from Racial Equity (City Lights Publishers, 2010) ISBN 978-0-87286-508-2.
- Dear White America: Letter to a New Minority (City Lights Publishers, 2012) ISBN 978-0-87286-521-1.
- Under the Affluence: Shaming the Poor, Praising the Rich and Sacrificing the Future of America (City Lights Publishers, 2015) ISBN 978-0-87286-693-5.
- Dispatches from the Race War (City Lights Publishers, 2020) ISBN 978-0-87286-809-0.
