= Rome 1960 (book) =

Rome 1960: The Olympics that Changed the World
- Author: David Maraniss
- Subject: 1960 Summer Olympics
- Publisher: Simon & Schuster
- Publication date: July 2008
- Pages: 478
- ISBN: 1-4165-3407-5

Rome 1960: The Olympics that Changed the World is a 2008 book by David Maraniss published by Simon & Schuster. The book discusses the cultural, social, and political impact of the 1960 Summer Olympics, held in Rome, as well as the changes going on in the world, at the time. Maraniss also chronicled the lives and stories of several athletes who played in the Olympics.
