= Joel Gilbert =

American filmmaker, musician, and conspiracy theorist

- Born: Joel Sion Gilbert; April 15, 1964 (age 62); Pittsburgh, Pennsylvania, U.S.
- Occupations: Filmmaker; Musician
- Years active: 2003–present

Joel Gilbert (born April 15, 1964) is an American filmmaker, musician, and conspiracy theorist. Gilbert's political films advance right-wing conspiracy theories. He has been a frequent guest on InfoWars.

Gilbert produced several films on Bob Dylan. He released the films Paul McCartney Really Is Dead: The Last Testament of George Harrison (2010), and Elvis Found Alive (2012) as documentaries, each exploring a conspiracy theory about the musicians' earthly states. In 2012, he re-classified them as mockumentaries.

In 2012, Gilbert released Dreams from My Real Father, which detailed his conspiracy theory regarding US President Barack Obama's biological father. The film was critically panned for its unsubstantiated allegations.

== Background ==
Gilbert's full name is Joel Sion Gilbert. He was born in Pittsburgh, Pennsylvania, and at a young age moved with his family to Oak Ridge, Tennessee. Gilbert is Jewish.

Gilbert is founder and lead singer of the Bob Dylan tribute band "Highway 61 Revisited". He was inspired to become a professional musician by a Bob Dylan album he was given in high school in the mid-1980s. He taught himself to play Dylan songs.

He has appeared on InfoWars as a guest and guest host.

== Reception ==
=== Bob Dylan ===
Reviewing Joel Gilbert's 2004 film Bob Dylan World Tours 1964–1974, Glide Magazine noted that Dylan's career during those 9 years was "significant for any Bob Dylan fan." The magazine said Gilbert focused on Dylan through the work of Barry Feinstein, Dylan's chief photographer during the film's time-frame. It criticized the film for low production values and boring interviews, saying that the amount of information within the film "might overwhelm". It noted the director's love for music history: "His passion for music in general is displayed in every scene."

In a DVD Talk review of Gilbert's Bob Dylan – 1975–1981 Rolling Thunder and The Gospel Years (2006), Phil Bacharach described the film as "a staggering four hours ... only for the diehard Bob Dylan aficionado", "exhaustive and exhausting," and "an unexceptional, sometimes amateurish, video production".

Of Gilbert's 2008 documentary Inside Bob Dylan's Jesus Years: Busy Being Born Again, DVD Talk noted that the film was an "examination of the period from 1978 to 1981 where Dylan shook off his Jewish heritage and became a born-again, Evangelical Christian." The reviewer said the film was amateurish and that viewers would "be hard-pressed to find a more irritatingly edited project."

Glide Magazine commented that Gilbert's film Bob Dylan Revealed (2011) "features an abundance of anecdotes certain to satisfy some of the most hard-core Dylan fans", but concluded that the film was marred by "questionable choices in the editing and production", creating "something you'll want to watch, but probably not watch again."

=== Paul McCartney Really Is Dead: The Last Testament of George Harrison ===
DVD Talk severely criticized Gilbert's 2010 work Paul McCartney Really Is Dead: The Last Testament of George Harrison. Paul Mavis wrote, "Jesus, I hate documentaries like this one. I mean ... they really hit me where I live. Of course it's all utterly mad. Anyone can see it's been faked. The scenario doesn't even make any sense. ... Nothing here is believable." Mavis said that the alleged conspiracy "hold[s] zero weight", and "not one element of the conspiracy theory holds up to factual scrutiny, and quite clearly and most obvious of all, McCartney is still around as living proof of the absurdity of the hoax."

Film Threat noted that an "audience's ability to suspend practical thought and accept the most outlandish concepts imaginable" was "stretched far beyond the fraying point" by Gilbert's film. They said the film had holes in logic and consistency large enough to drive the Magical Mystery Tour bus through.

The film was originally marketed and distributed as a documentary.

=== Elvis Found Alive ===
Gilbert's next film, Elvis Found Alive (2012) was similarly marketed as a documentary. In 2012, Gilbert reclassified both this film and the Paul McCartney one as "mockumentaries," and edited their Web sites to that effect, shortly before he released his conspiracy theory film that year alleging to have found new information about President Barack Obama's father.

=== Dreams from My Real Father ===
Gilbert's Dreams from My Real Father (2012), alleged that United States President Barack Obama's "real" father was an American communist. It was strongly criticized for its many unsubstantiated allegations about President Obama's birth and background. Slate said that the film "peddles a conspiracy theory so convoluted that more traditional birthers must be envious of its creativity". Both Jerome Corsi and The Hollywood Reporter stated that the film makes unsubstantiated allegations that President Barack Obama lied about being the son of Barack Obama Sr. The film claims that Obama's real father was Frank Marshall Davis, a communist from Chicago, and that Obama's mother posed for nude photography. The Hollywood Reporter wrote, "It's about the lowest thing you can do to accuse, with no evidence, the opposition candidate's mother of being a porn star".

=== The Trayvon Hoax ===
Gilbert's film The Trayvon Hoax (2019) is about the killing of Trayvon Martin. It is based on a book of the same name by Gilbert, which had argued there was witness fraud during George Zimmerman's trial. The premise of the film is that a key trial witness was not the person whom the Martin family, their attorney, and the prosecution claimed she was. Glenn Loury and John McWhorter found the film persuasive, despite their misgivings about the filmmaker.

In 2019, Zimmerman, represented by Larry Klayman, filed an unsuccessful lawsuit against Trayvon Martin's parents (Sybrina Fulton and Tracy Martin) as well as Attorney Ben Crump, who had represented the family. Zimmerman's lawsuit was based on the allegations made in Gilbert's book. In 2020, Gilbert's production company, also represented by Klayman, filed a lawsuit that alleged breach of contract after a movie theater canceled Gilbert's private screening of his film.

== Filmography ==
- Bob Dylan: World Tours 1966–1974 (Through The Camera Of Barry Feinstein) (2004)*
- Bob Dylan: 1975–1981 (Rolling Thunder and The Gospel Years) (2006)*
- Bob Dylan: 1966 World Tour (The Home Movies) (2003, 2006)*
- Bob Dylan: The Unauthorized Documentaries (2006) [A repackaging of Gilbert's first three films]*
- Farewell Israel: Bush, Iran, and The Revolt of Islam (2007)**
- Inside Bob Dylan's Jesus Years: Busy Being Born... Again! (2008)*
- Bob Dylan Never Ending Tour Diaries: Drummer Winston Watson's Incredible Journey (2009)*
- Atomic Jihad: Ahmadinejad's Coming War For Islamic Revival And Obama's Politics of Defeat (2010)**
- Paul McCartney Really Is Dead: The Last Testament of George Harrison (2010)***
- Bob Dylan Revealed (2011)*
- Elvis Found Alive (2012)***
- Dreams from My Real Father: A Story of Reds and Deception (2012)**
- There's No Place Like Utopia (2014)**
- The Constitution Strikes Back: Episode VIII - The Cruzade (2016)****
- Trump: The Art of the Insult (2017)***
- The Trayvon Hoax: Unmasking the Witness Fraud that Divided America (2019)**

Legend:

- (*) Music history film
- (**) Political documentary
- (***) Spoofs/mockumentary
- (****) Animated short
- (as classified by Gilbert)

== See also ==
- Barack Obama citizenship conspiracy theories
- Conspiracy theory
- Elvis sightings
- Paul is dead
