= Jason Mattera =

American writer, political activist, radio host, and journalist

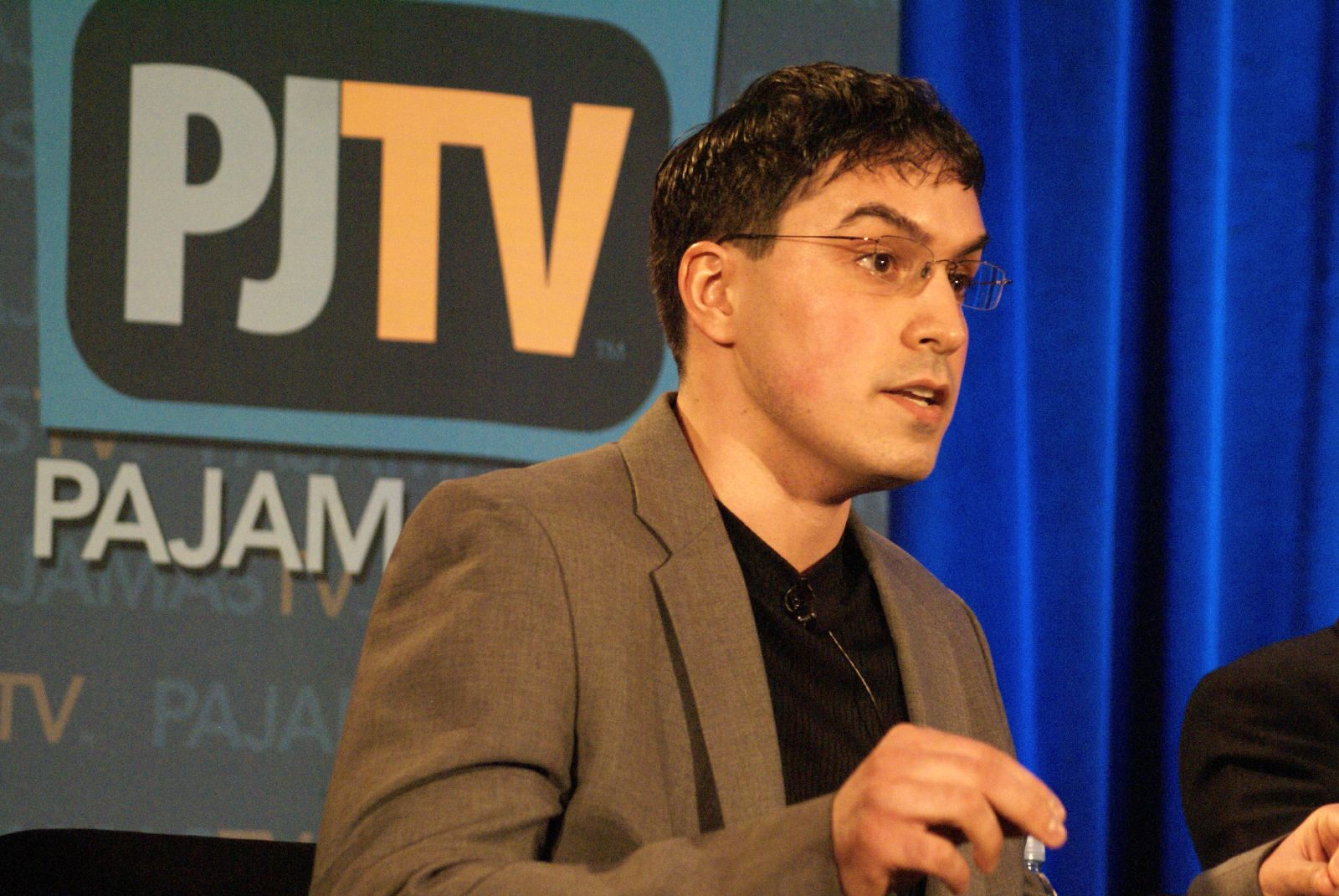
- Mattera in 2009.
- Born: Jason Joseph Mattera; September 8, 1983 (age 43); New York City, U.S.
- Education: Roger Williams University (BS)
- Occupations: Author, journalist, media personality
- Writing career
- Subject: U.S. politics
- Notable works: Obama Zombies, Hollywood Hypocrites, Crapitalism; The Jason Mattera Show

Jason Joseph Mattera (born September 8, 1983) is an American writer, conservative activist, radio host, and Emmy-nominated journalist. Originally from New York City, Mattera started in conservative political activism as a student at Roger Williams University. In 2010, Mattera released his first New York Times bestseller, Obama Zombies. Mattera's second book, Hollywood Hypocrites, was published in 2012, and his third book, Crapitalism, was published in 2014, all by Simon & Schuster. Mattera was editor of Human Events magazine from 2010–12, and from 2010–13 hosted a weekend talk show on the New York City radio station 77 WABC.

In 2015, Mattera became a correspondent for the syndicated TV series Crime Watch Daily, which was produced and syndicated by Warner Bros. He has received two Emmy nominations for his work on the show.

== Personal background and education ==
Born in the New York City borough of Brooklyn, Mattera is of Italian and Puerto Rican descent. Mattera grew up in Sunset Park, Brooklyn and graduated from Bishop Ford Central Catholic High School in 2001. In 2005, Jason Mattera graduated summa cum laude from Roger Williams University with a Bachelor of Science degree in business management and communications.

In December, 2012, he married real estate broker and season 3 winner of The Apprentice Kendra Todd.

== Career ==
=== Writing ===
In 2010, Mattera wrote his first book, Obama Zombies: How the Liberal Machine Brainwashed My Generation. That book debuted at #14 on The New York Times best-seller list for hardcover non-fiction. Stephen Gutowski at Human Events praised the book, which he said "well chronicles how liberals have taken advantage of and brain-washed" college-aged voters. Ann Coulter called Obama Zombies "piercing, eye-opening, and deliciously witty" and said it "is required reading for an entire generation who have been sold liberal lies." In Obama Zombies, Mattera writes that "For an entire year, otherwise clear-thinking members of the most affluent, over-educated, information-drenched generation in American history fell prey to the most expensive, hi-tech, laser-focused marketing assault in presidential campaign history." "The result," he continued, was "an unthinking mass of young voters marched forward to elect the most radical and untested president in U.S. history."

In 2012, Mattera published his second book, Hollywood Hypocrites: The Devastating Truth About Obama's Biggest Backers. Like Mattera's first book, Hollywood Hypocrites was a New York Times bestseller. An ambush video intended to promote this book received significant attention. In mid-March 2012 Mattera confronted comedian Chris Rock at a Sundance Film Festival after party over remarks that Rock made calling the Tea Party movement racist. The video shows Rock lunging for the camera. On why he wrote the book, Mattera says "It's time to recognize the marketing and fund-raising power the Hollywood Progressives wield. It's time to dig into the data and set the record straight. It's time to turn the media spotlight back on the image makers and prevent the Hollywood elite from hoodwinking American voters once again." The late Andrew Breitbart called Hollywood Hypocrites a "barrage of body blows to Hollywood's holier-than-thou limousine liberals," while Mark Levin praised the book as "eye-popping, exhaustively researched, and absolutely hilarious."

In 2014, Mattera published his third best-selling book, Crapitalism: Liberals Who Make Millions Swiping Your Tax Dollars, which "reveals the infuriating schemes that result when the filthy rich combine cronyism and capitalism" and, according to Mattera, "pulls back the curtain on a cast of cronyites who make millions taking advantage of taxpayers—and still brag about how they're looking out for the little guy." The American Spectator reviewed Crapitalism as a "full-throated utterly vernacular defense of free-markets."

Also in 2012, Jason Mattera wrote the foreword to the book Walk in Generational Blessings: Living a Legacy of Transformation Through Your Family by his father Joseph G. Mattera.

Mattera's articles have appeared on websites including the Washington Post, Breitbart's Big Journalism, National Review Online,Townhall.com, Human Events, The Daily Caller, and Hot Air.

In March 2010, Mattera was named the editor of Human Events, making him the youngest editor of any national periodical. He remained editor until March 2012.

=== Campus activism ===
At Roger Williams University, Mattera was chairman of the Campus Conservatives organization and editor in chief of campus conservative newsletter The Hawk's Right Eye. The New York Times reported that The Hawk's Right Eye "upset college officials with its critiques of Islam and homosexuality. In 2003, the College Republican National Committee named Mattera the Best State Chairman, and Young America's Foundation recognized him as a top college conservative activist for two years.

In response to a 2003 appearance by Judy Shepard, whose son Matthew Shepard was murdered for being gay, The Hawk's Right Eye published articles accusing "militant homosexuals" who supported hate-crime legislation of opposing free speech and a gay-rights group of indoctrinating students. University president Roy Nirschel responded: "While we affirm the right of campus organizations to hold different points of view and to disagree, the university will not condone publications that create a hostile environment for our students." Administration also temporarily halted funding for printing The Hawk's Right Eye. Mattera defended his newsletter and claimed that campus conservatives were victims of censorship and anti-Christian bigotry.

In 2004, Mattera attracted national attention for creating the Whites Only Scholarship worth $50 to highlight, what he said, was the inequity of racial preferences. Having received a $5,000 scholarship from the Hispanic College Fund, Mattera felt that racial scholarships promoted by the University gave him "an inherent advantage over my white peers." He told The New York Times that the scholarship was an obvious parody of others specifically available only for minorities: "If you are a white student on campus, you don't have anyone helping you, there is no one compiling a list of scholarships just for you, Why is it that only students of color have this?" Sixteen people applied for the Whites Only Scholarship by February 2004. The Rhode Island Republican Party criticized the scholarship for allegedly being racist, which Mattera said actually proved the point of the parody: that the widespread racial preferences enacted across academia are, indeed, racist.

=== Aggressive journalism ===
On YouTube, Mattera posts videos of him confronting politicians. Mattera's unscheduled interviews have included Vice President Joe Biden, Senator Al Franken, Congressman Barney Frank, House Minority Leader Steny Hoyer, Congressman Charlie Rangel, Congressman Alan Grayson, Senator Tom Harkin, Senator Bernie Sanders, Robert Gibbs, among others, and have garnered millions of views.

Mattera's video of Vice President Joe Biden gained notoriety when Biden stood by his claims that "murder will continue to rise, rape will continue to rise, all crimes will continue to rise" if a Democratic Party spending bill was not passed. Biden's office then filed an official complaint against Mattera.

In 2014, Mattera created headlines when he asked Hillary Clinton if she would inscribe her book "Hard Choices" to Christopher Stevens, the American ambassador murdered in Benghazi.

In 2015, Mattera turned his attention to the world of crime, starring in the Warner Bros. television show "Crime Watch Daily." "If you see [correspondent] Jason Mattera...coming at you, you run the other way. That's not a good day for a criminal," said Senior Executive Producer Lisa Gregorisch-Dempsey. Mattera's segments have run the gamut, from investigating murder mysteries, cold cases, suspicious suicides, and questionable disappearances, to tracking down murder suspects, identity thieves, and confronting scam artists, like a woman who pretended to be a doctor and faked her son's cancer to raise money.

=== Speaking ===
In 2010 Mattera spoke at the Conservative Political Action Conference (CPAC). In his speech, he stated: "Students are subjected to a bombardment of liberal talking points throughout their collegiate careers." He also compared CPAC to the Woodstock Festival and added: "Except that our women are beautiful, we speak in complete sentences, and our notion of freedom doesn't consist of snorting cocaine, which is certainly one thing that separates us from Barack Obama." Mattera also impersonated comedian Chris Rock, according to a Kate Zernicke report in the NY Times, in attacking "diversity" and proclaiming "Get your government off my freedom!" The validity of Zernick's Rock-impersonation characterization was challenged by conservative blogger Andrew Breitbart, who said "[Mattera] happens to be from Brooklyn! He's using his voice!" Further on diversity, Mattera imagined college courses on "what it means to be a feminist new black man [as] ... a crossover between RuPaul and Barney Frank".

=== Radio and television ===
From 2010–13, Mattera hosted a weekly talk show on WABC-AM, The Jason Mattera Show, as well as guest hosting on the station starting in June 2010. "Our listeners have embraced Jason's political acumen, mischievous style, and New York sense of humor," WABC's then program director Laurie Cantillo said in a statement. Of the selection, Don Imus commented "I love this kid." Mattera is also a frequent guest on The Fox News Channel and The Fox Business Channel, regularly appearing on Hannity, Fox & Friends, and Varney & Co. He's also appeared on CNN and C-SPAN. It was announced on 12/19/2012 that he will be co-hosting a national weekday radio talk show starting on January 2, 2013 with Newspaper columnist, Fox News Channel's and The Five co-host Andrea Tantaros on Talk Radio Network called The Andrea Tantaros show with Jason Mattera. As of early January 2014, Mattera is no longer listed on the WABC radio schedule.

In 2015, Mattera joined the new Warner Bros. television show "Crime Watch Daily," which is billed as a "one-hour program covering the most compelling aspects of the world of crime, mystery and intrigue." By the third season, Mattera had received two Emmy nominations in the category of Outstanding Special Class Series.

== Bibliography ==
- Mattera, Jason (2010), Obama Zombies: How the Liberal Machine Brainwashed My Generation, New York City: Threshold Editions, ISBN 978-1-4391-7207-0
- Mattera, Jason (2012), Hollywood Hypocrites: The Devastating Truth About Obama's Biggest Backers, New York City: Threshold Editions, ISBN 978-1-4516-2563-9
- Mattera, Jason (2014), Crapitalism: Liberals Who Make Millions Swiping Your Tax Dollars, New York City: Threshold Editions, ISBN 978-1476750422
