= The New New Deal =

2012 book by Michael Grunwald

- First edition
- Author: Michael Grunwald
- Language: English
- Subject: Presidency of Barack Obama
- Publisher: Simon & Schuster
- Publication date: August 14, 2012
- Publication place: United States
- Media type: Print (paperback and hardcover)
- Pages: 519
- ISBN: 9781451642322

The New New Deal: The Hidden Story of Change in the Obama Era is a 2012 book about the Presidency of Barack Obama and its response to the 2008 financial crisis written by journalist Michael Grunwald. He describes the discussions and debates that led to the government's anti-recession measures such as the American Recovery and Reinvestment Act of 2009 (ARRA). Taking a positive review of the President's efforts, Grunwald defends the economic measures as full of important, long-term investments while charging Republican Party opponents as being hypocritical and self-serving. The book was published by Simon & Schuster on August 14, 2012.

Grunwald had previously served as a journalist for Time as well as the author of the 2007 non-fiction work The Swamp: The Everglades, Florida, and the Politics of Paradise. The title of his new book intentionally refers back to the 'New Deal' policies of President Franklin D. Roosevelt, a matter also much discussed in the book itself. Supportive reviews ran in publications such as Bloomberg View, The Economist, and Kirkus Reviews, while negative reviews appeared in publications such as Reason.com and City Journal.

== Contents ==
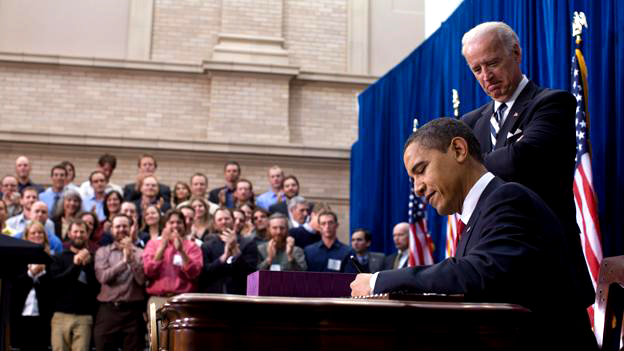
President Barack Obama signed the ARRA into law on February 17, 2009. Vice President Joe Biden stood directly behind him.

Grunwald describes the goals of the Obama administration as finding a "direction, not a destination." Thus, he details the debates and discussions behind anti-recession measures as about "metamorphosis" as well as fiscal stimulus. President Obama took office in January 2009, Grunwald writes, and enacted a "down payment on long-term goals" in the short political time space that Obama had, using Obama's "one shot to spend boatloads of money pursuing his vision." As Grunwald states, the American Recovery and Reinvestment Act of 2009 (ARRA) took shape based on a conscious desire to recreate the public works projects undertaken by President Franklin D. Roosevelt.

In addition, he writes about how Obama, in a particular contrast to Roosevelt, actively participated in the transition between his team and the George W. Bush administration. The new president, as he details, publicly supported the past Troubled Asset Relief Program as well as measures to assist the beleaguered U.S. auto industry. Grunwald also notes Obama's choice of Rahm Emanuel as White House Chief of Staff as a prime example of Obama's effort to create a revamped version of Bill Clinton's insider policy team, with their Keynesian macro-economic view represented.

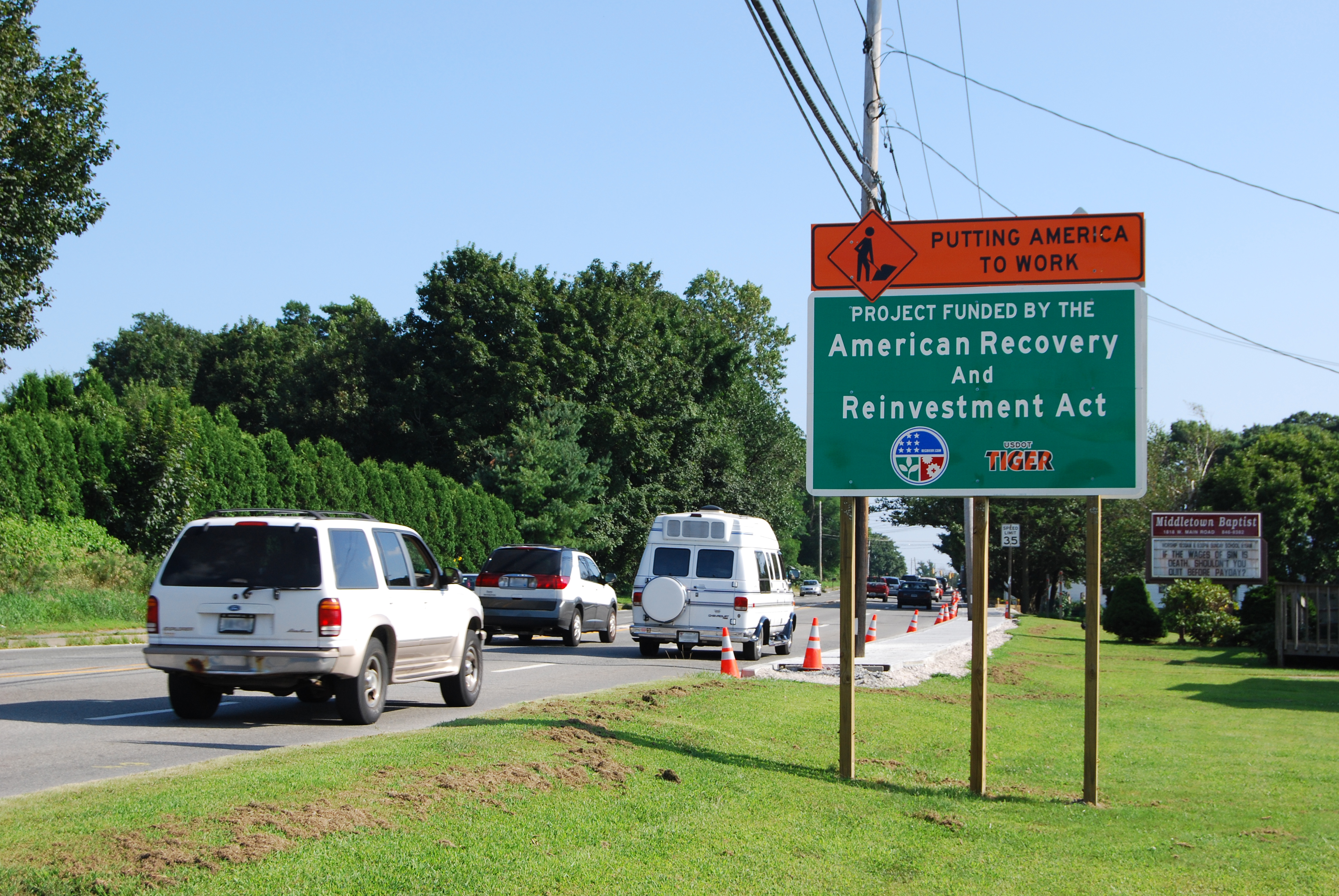
This Middletown, Rhode Island road project, like many others across the U.S., took place in August 2009 as part of the ARRA program.

Grunwald details how one administration adviser described the process as "[s]omeone would make a single phone call, and suddenly it’s, 'All righty. Put a billion dollars over there'." Grunwald negatively portrays the objections of Republicans to the government spending increases as seizing an opportunity to oppose the new president. He argues that they opposed even things that they supposedly called for in the past, such as tax cuts, by refusing to co-operate at all, with Grunwald charging that Republicans knew they could portray themselves positively on the side of fiscal restraint should the economy falter further.

Ultimately, Grunwald accounts how Obama's $787 billion stimulus package amounted to about 4% of America's GDP while, during the Great Depression, the biggest stimulus in any year amounted to just about 1.5% of GDP. The President's early, pre-inauguration plan, at $300 billion, increased given the particularly frustrating unemployment situation. Early 2009 data had presented losses of around 800,000 a month.

He writes that critics of ARRA correctly view it as using economic tools to alter American society, implementing particular school reforms, measures supporting low-carbon energy, health care regulations, and the like all in ways that shift more control to the executive branch and away from state and local governments. He quotes economist Larry Summers' observation that governments inherently make bad venture capitalists. However, Grunwald defends this overlying Obama policy as a set of bold investments, especially in regards to spending on untested new technologies, that will set up large future gains.

== Reviews ==
City Journal ran a negative review by writer Judah Bellin. He wrote, "[T]he stimulus provided sound basis for opposition: in addition to the well-publicized failures of Solyndra and Ener1, numerous infrastructure projects faced local obstacles and delays, leading to Obama’s memorable admission that 'shovel ready was not as shovel-ready as we expected'." He also argued that "Obama comes across as similarly unaware of the limits of top-down planning" in the book as well as that the 2010 midterm elections provided a rejoinder to President Obama's economic policy vision.

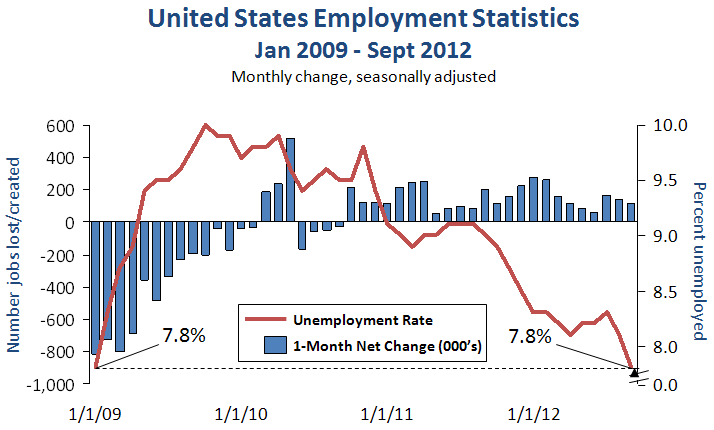
This image shows U.S. employment statistics changes from January 2009 to September 2012.

Kirkus Reviews published a positive review, describing the book as a "cogent reality check" as well as a "pointed, in-the-trenches study whose thrust will be borne out with time. The Economist also ran a supportive review, the news-magazine stating that the book "does a meticulous job, casting much new light on the advance thinking... both before the election and, especially, during the long transition". In addition, The Economist concluded:

The truth is that no one really knows yet how well spent the longer-term parts of the immense Recovery and Reinvestment Act will turn out to have been. But no writer has yet gone this far, at least in unraveling where the money has gone. The New New Deal is the most interesting book that has been published about the Obama administration. Even Republicans should read it.

The editor-in-chief of The Politico, John Harris, praised the book, arguing that it "demolishes cliches and vividly reframes our thinking about President Obama and his stimulus package through a gripping narrative." Harris also wrote, "Even if everyone doesn't agree with Grunwald's provocative conclusions, every serious reader will see in Grunwald’s book a vindication of serious journalism, at a time when we need it." Bloomberg View columnist Frank Wilkinson also commented on Grunwald's "excellent book", saying that he viewed Grunwald as "a crisp and engaging writer".

Tim Cavanaugh wrote for reason.com blasting the book and what he viewed as the author's "chutzpah"; he commented that Grunwald expressed "no knowledge of economics beyond what figures in headlines, which is probably worse than knowing no economics at all." He also stated that the book's only strength was its "rotisserie league party wonkery" given that it otherwise, in his view, "goes on for nearly half a thousand frequently repetitive pages of text, all explicating a convoluted set of theories." Cavanaugh argued:

Given the three years of economic stagnation that followed, Grunwald here is ignoring the real story, arguably the most important news story of our time: The credit unwind never ended... since the putative end of the recession, the suffering of Americans at the level of the street, the family, and the retail store has continued unabated, and over a greater time duration (another calculation Grunwald doesn't engage).

== See also ==
- Great Recession
- 2012 in literature
- American Recovery and Reinvestment Act of 2009
- Economic policies of the Obama administration
- Modern liberalism in the United States
- New Deal

=== Related books ===
- Economics Does Not Lie
- End This Depression Now!
