= Andrew Maraniss =

American author

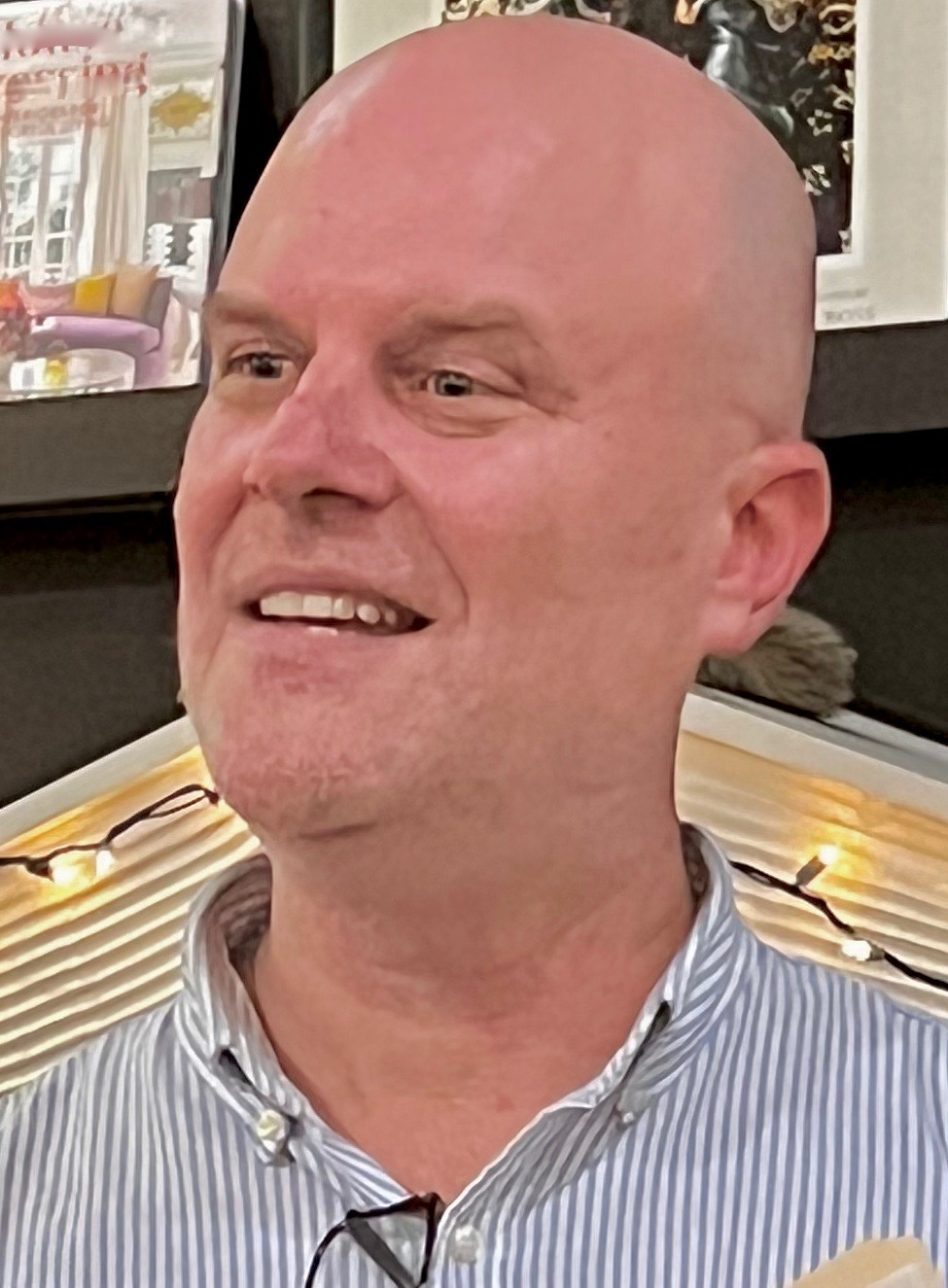
- Andrew Maraniss in August, 2022
- Citizenship: U.S.
- Education: Vanderbilt University
- Relatives: David Maraniss
- Writing career
- Genres: Sports, biography
- Notable awards: 2015 Lillian Smith Book Award
- Website: andrewmaraniss.com

Andrew Maraniss (/ˈmærənɪs/ MARE-ə-niss) is an American author, best known for his book, "Strong Inside: Perry Wallace and the collision of race and sports in the south", depicting Perry Wallace, the first African-American to play college basketball under an athletic scholarship in the Southeastern Conference (Vanderbilt University) in the 1960s. The book was on the New York Times best-seller list in both the sports and civil rights categories for four consecutive months. It received the 2015 Lillian Smith Book Award and a Special Recognition Award by the Robert F. Kennedy Book Awards Foundation.

Maraniss attended Vanderbilt University in 1992 on a Fred Russell-Grantland Rice Scholarship for Sports Journalism. He won the school's Charles Foster Alexander Award for excellence in journalism in 1992 and in 2016 was inducted in the Vanderbilt Student Media Hall of Fame. He was designated Vanderbilt's "Writer-in-Residence" in 2017. The popularity of the book reoriented his former career in public relations into that of full-time author. After Strong Inside, Maraniss published additional works including Games of Deception (2019), Singled Out (2021), and Inaugural Ballers (2022). Maraniss' father, David Maraniss, is a Pulitzer Prize-winning author and associate editor for The Washington Post.

== Early life and family ==
Maraniss was born in Madison, Wisconsin, the son of David and Linda Maraniss who met there in high school. His grandfather, Elliott Maraniss, was editor of Madison's Capital Times newspaper in the 1970s. His grandmother, Mary Maraniss, was a 1966 graduate of the University of Wisconsin, Phi Beta Kappa, and book editor for the University of Wisconsin Press. Marannis' father, David, has been associate editor of The Washington Post'' since 1977 and won a Pulitzer Prize for national reporting in 1993 for his coverage of Bill Clinton's candidacy during the 1992 presidential election. The senior Maraniss said that his son Andrew "has always been more mature than Linda and I", a child who would save his candy rather than eat it all at once. When Andrew was young, his father was a budding journalist who found a job at the Trenton Times in New Jersey, that necessitated the family's move from Wisconsin to the east coast. In the 1970s another job opened up at The Washington Post so they moved to Washington, D.C. As a youth in the late 1970s, Andrew attended press conferences with his father. When Maraniss was in high school, his father was transferred to Austin, Texas, to serve as southwest bureau chief for the Post.

== Education ==
While in high school in Austin, Maraniss was sports editor for the school paper, the Austin High Maroon. He got a job writing sports articles as an intern for the Austin American–Statesman. A poster at school about a college scholarship caught his attention and prompted him to submit his news clippings to apply for it. His writing won him a Fred Russell-Grantland Rice Sportswriting Scholarship to Vanderbilt University in 1988. Sportswriting Hall-of-Famer Fred Russell, for whom the sportswriting scholarship is named, took the four recipients out to lunch a couple of times a year and developed personal relationships with them. The tradition continued until Russell's death in 2003. Maraniss worked his way up to sports editor of the Hustler, the college newspaper. After graduation, he had a job as Vanderbilt basketball sports information director.

== Strong Inside ==
In 1989, as a 19 year old student, he read an article in a student publication about Perry Wallace. One of his professors, Yolette Jones (associate dean in the College of Arts and Sciences as of 2017), suggested that he interview Wallace who was then a law professor in Baltimore. Maraniss did so, and wrote two papers about Wallace and some student newspaper articles. Maraniss recalled, "I remember sitting on the floor of my dormitory, scribbling in a notebook and feeling like the world was opening up to me as I talked to the most impressive person I had ever talked to before". After graduation Maraniss stayed on, working as associate director of media relations for Vanderbilt Athletics from 1992 to 1997. In 1998 he moved to Tampa, taking a job as Media Relations Manager for the inaugural season of the Tampa Bay Rays. He then returned to Nashville to join a public relations firm, McNeely, Pigott and Fox and became a partner there for 18 years. Maraniss knew he could write a book (his father had written ten of them) and he was looking for inspiration. At a family gathering he lamented not having a compelling subject to write about. Family members reminded him of his articles about Perry Wallace years prior (which he had not thought of) and the idea clicked. Wallace was fascinating because he was not only a basketball star who broke racial barriers, but also a high school valedictorian, engineering major, law school graduate and eventually a law-school professor. Maraniss had a full-time job, so his research and writing was on nights and weekends and was slow-moving, but he managed to do over 80 interviews in his preparation. To the credit of his research, Maraniss uncovered a transcript of a 1968 statement of Wallace's own words to the Vanderbilt race relations committee: "An occurrence of no consequence for a white player was transformed into a nightmare". Maraniss and Wallace became fast friends through their dozens of interviews as well as later one-on-one public interviews which were broadcast.

The manuscript was published by the Vanderbilt University Press and became the best-selling book in its history. Maraniss said, "It was seven years before I had a publisher, so I didn't know if it would ever get out there..." With the book's success, Maraniss was besieged with book signings and requests to appear on talk shows including NBC's Meet the Press, NPR's "All Things Considered ", MSNBC's "Morning Joe " ESPN's "Keith Olberman Show, " ESPN Radio's "The Sporting Life " and others. He has created an adaption of the original book, for young people, with a slightly different title, "Strong Inside: The True Story of How Perry Wallace Broke College Basketball's Color Line". This edition was named as one of the Top 10 Biographies for Youth and a Top 10 Sports Books for Youth of 2017 by the American Library Association.

Following the success of Maraniss' book, a motion picture documentary depicting Wallace's life has been made by filmmaker Rich Gentile, entitled "Triumph: The Untold Story of Perry Wallace". It is narrated by Academy Award winning actor Forest Whitaker. The documentary coincides with the 50th anniversary of the integration of SEC basketball, and premiered at Vanderbilt on December 4, 2017. The film was commissioned by Vanderbilt University, and Chancellor Nicholas Zeppos is one of the film's executive producers. As of 2017, the film was not commercially released.

All first-year students at Vanderbilt are required to read an assigned book during the summer prior to their first semester, known as the "Commons Reading". The classes of 2020 and 2021 were assigned "Strong Inside".

== Awards and honors ==
- New York Times best-seller list author in both the sports and civil rights categories.
- 2015 Lillian Smith Book Award
- Special Recognition Award by the Robert F. Kennedy Book Awards Foundation.
- Fred Russell-Grantland Rice Scholarship for Sports Journalism.
- Charles Foster Alexander Award for excellence in journalism in 1992
- Vanderbilt Student media Hall of Fame, 2016.
- Vanderbilt's "Writer -in Residence" in 2017.
- Top 10 Biographies for Youth and a Top 10 Sports Books for Youth of 2017 (Youth edition) by the American Library Association.
- The Vanderbilt University "Commons reading list" for all incoming students class 2020 and 2021.

== List of works ==
- Strong Inside (2015)
- Games of Deception (2019)
- Singled Out (2021)
- Inaugural Ballers (2022)
