= Barack Obama: The Story =

2012 biography of Barack Obama

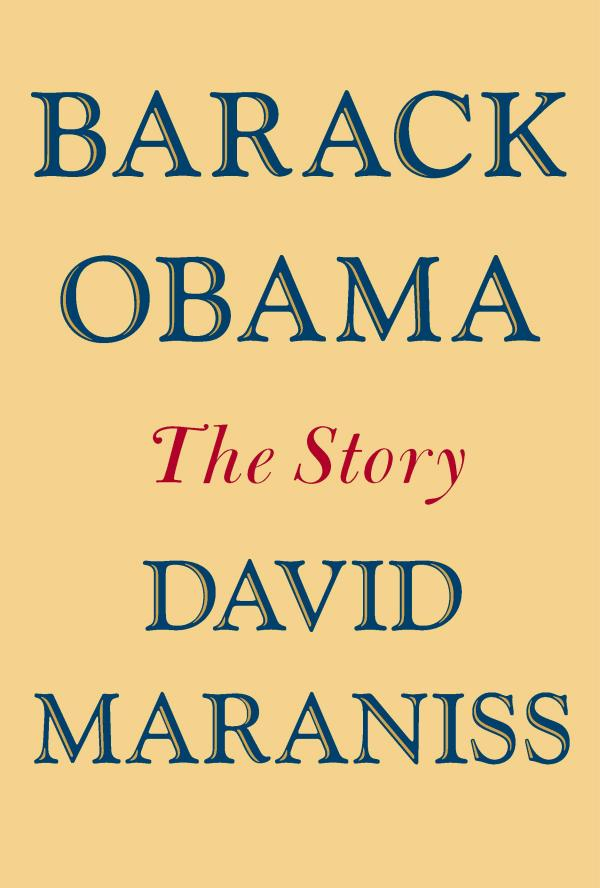
- First edition cover
- Author: David Maraniss
- Language: English
- Publisher: Simon & Schuster
- Publication place: United States
- Pages: 672
- ISBN: 978-1439160411

Barack Obama: The Story is a book written by David Maraniss on the life of United States President Barack Obama.

The biography was published on June 19, 2012.
