= David Maraniss =

American journalist and author (born 1949)

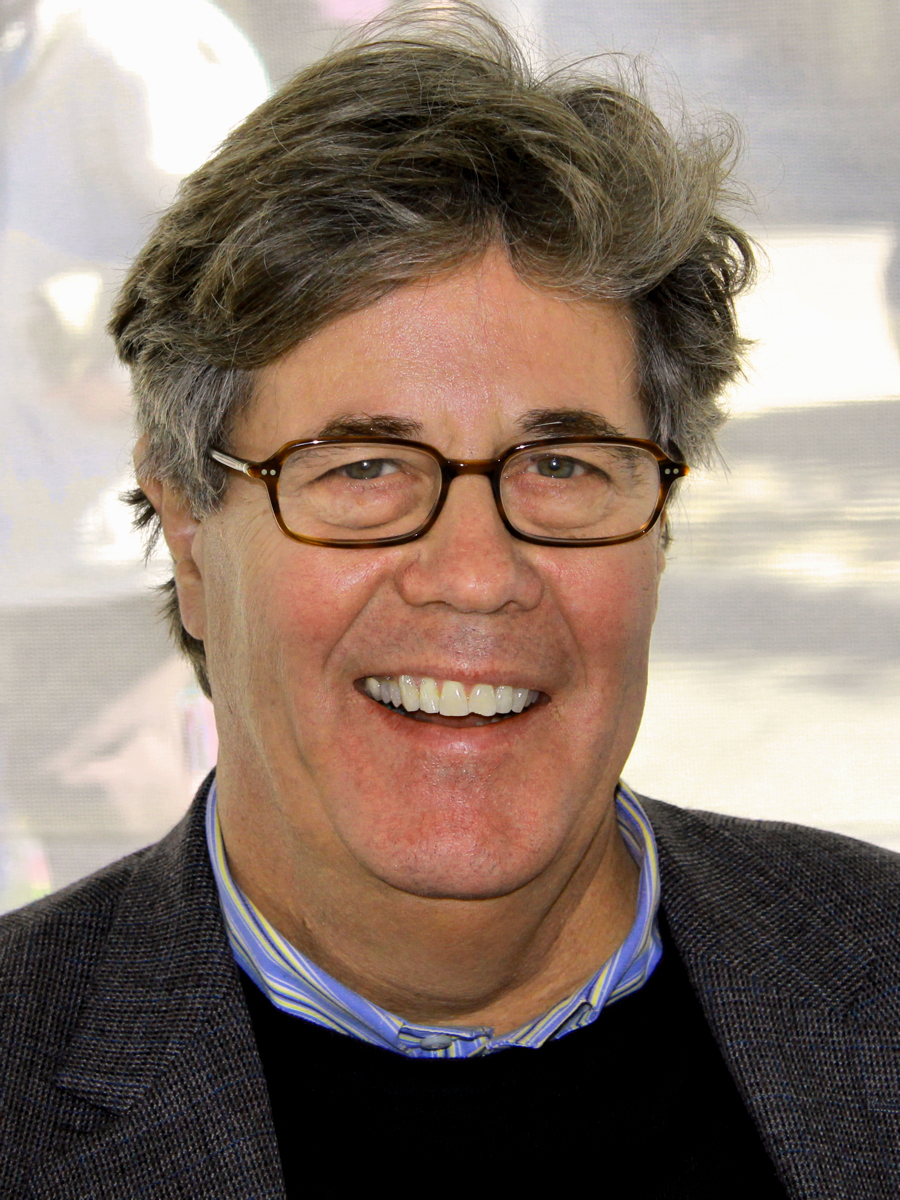
- Maraniss at the 2012 Texas Book Festival
- Born: August 6, 1949 (age 77); Detroit, Michigan, U.S.
- Education: University of Wisconsin-Madison
- Occupations: Author, Journalist
- Spouse: Linda Maraniss (m. 1969)
- Children: 2
- Writing career
- Notable works: When Pride Still Mattered (1999); Rome 1960 (2008); Barack Obama: The Story (2012)
- Website: davidmaraniss.com

David Maraniss (/ˈmærənɪs/ MARR-ə-niss; born August 6, 1949) is an American award-winning journalist and author, currently serving as an associate editor for The Washington Post.

Maraniss is the author of numerous books, ranging from politics to sports. He has written books on Green Bay Packers head coach Vince Lombardi, Baseball Hall of Famer Roberto Clemente, the 1960 Summer Olympics, and on U.S. Presidents Bill Clinton and Barack Obama.

== Personal life ==
Maraniss was born in Detroit, Michigan to Elliot and Mary Maraniss. He attended the University of Wisconsin-Madison.

Maraniss and his wife Linda, married in 1969 and had two children; they live in Washington, D.C. and Madison, Wisconsin. His son, Andrew Maraniss is also an author and was on the New York Times bestseller list in 2015.

== Career ==
Maraniss began his career as reporter at The Capital Times in Madison, and later worked at the Trenton Times.

For The Washington Post, he won the Pulitzer Prize for National Reporting in 1993, for his "revealing articles on the life and political records" of Bill Clinton, then a presidential candidate. He was also assigned the job of biographer for their coverage of 2008 presidential candidate, Barack Obama.

== Recognition ==
In 2022, Maraniss published his biography Path Lit by Lightning: The Life of Jim Thorpe, which received critical acclaim for its in-depth portrayal of the legendary athlete. The book was recognized as a finalist for the Pulitzer Prize for History in 2023. Continuing his involvement in journalism and academia, Maraniss returned to Vanderbilt University in the Spring of 2024 as a distinguished visiting professor, co-teaching courses on political biography and sports and society alongside his son, Andrew Maraniss. He also served as a member of the jury for the 2025 Plutarch Award, presented by the Biographers International Organization. In addition to his teaching and writing, Maraniss remains active in journalism, contributing articles to The Washington Post, including coverage of the 2024 U.S. presidential election.

== Bibliography ==
=== Politics ===
- First in His Class: A Biography of Bill Clinton (1995)
- Tell Newt to Shut Up! (with Michael Weisskopf) (1996)
- The Clinton Enigma: A Four-and-a-Half Minute Speech Reveals This President's Entire Life (1998)
- The Prince of Tennessee: Al Gore Meets His Fate (2000)
- Barack Obama: The Story (2012)

=== Sports ===
- When Pride Still Mattered: A Life of Vince Lombardi (1999)
- Clemente: The Passion and Grace of Baseball's Last Hero (2006)
- Rome 1960: The Olympics that Changed the World (2008)
- Path Lit by Lightning: The Life of Jim Thorpe (2022)

=== Others ===
- They Marched into Sunlight: War and Peace, Vietnam and America, October 1967 (2004)
- Once in a Great City: A Detroit Story (2015)
- A Good American Family: The Red Scare and My Father (2019)
