= List of active separatist movements in North America =

This is a list of currently active separatist movements in America. Separatism includes autonomism and secessionism.

== Criteria ==
What is and is not considered an autonomist or secessionist movement is sometimes contentious. Entries on this list must meet three criteria:

1. They are active movements with active members.
2. They are seeking greater autonomy or self-determination for a geographic region (as opposed to personal autonomy).
3. They are citizens / people of the conflict area and do not come from another country.

Under each region listed is one or more of the following:

- De facto state (de facto entity): for regions without diplomatic recognition but with de facto autonomy.
- Proposed state: proposed name for a seceding sovereign state.
- Proposed autonomous area: for movements towards greater autonomy for an area but not outright secession.
  - De facto autonomous government: for governments with de facto autonomous control over a region.
  - Government-in-exile: for a government based outside of the region in question, with or without control.
  - Political party (or parties): for political parties involved in a political system to push for autonomy or secession.
  - Militant organisation(s): for armed organisations.
  - Advocacy group(s): for non-belligerent, non-politically participatory entities.
  - Ethnic / ethnoreligious / racial / regional / religious group(s).

== Antigua and Barbuda ==
Barbuda

- Proposed state: Independence for Barbuda or federalism
  - Political parties: Barbuda People's Movement

== Belize ==
Toledo District

- Ethnic group: Maya peoples
  - Proposed: autonomy for Maya peoples in southern Belize
  - Political party: Maya Leaders Alliance

== Canada ==
Alberta

- Proposed: Independence for Alberta or unification with the United States
  - Political parties: Independence Party of Alberta, Wildrose Independence Party of Alberta, Wildrose Loyalty Coalition, Republican Party of Alberta (Unification with USA)
  - Advocacy groups: Stay Free Alberta, Alberta Prosperity Project

Blackfoot Confederacy

- Ethnic group: Blackfoot
  - Proposed: independence for Blackfoot Confederacy

British Columbia

- Proposed state: British Columbia
  - Political party: Progressive Nationalist Party of British Columbia, BC Independence Party

Northeast British Columbia

- Proposed: independence for Northeast British Columbia

Cape Breton Island

- Proposed: Breaking Cape Breton Island off from Nova Scotia or have autonomy

Cascadia

Cascadia

- Proposed: Independence or Sovereignty for Cascadia
  - Advocacy group: Cascadia Department of Bioregion

Haida Gwaii

- Ethnic group: Haida
  - Proposed: independence for Council of the Haida Nation
  - Advocacy group: Council of the Haida Nation

Heiltsuk Nation

- Ethnic group: Heiltsuk
  - Proposed: self determination for Heiltsuk Nation

Labrador

- Ethnic group: Inuit, Innu and Labradorians
  - Proposed: Splitting Labrador as an independent Province

Newfoundland

- Proposed: independence for Newfoundland

Northern Ontario

- Proposed: Splitting Northern Ontario out as an independent Province
  - Political party: Northern Ontario Party

Northwestern Ontario

- Proposed: statehood for Northwestern Ontario

Nunavik

- Ethnic group: Inuit
  - Proposed: autonomy for Nunavik

Nuxalk

- Proposed state: Nuxalk Nation
  - Advocacy group: Nuxalk Nation (member of the Unrepresented Nations and Peoples Organization until 2008)

Quebec

- Proposed: Independence for Quebec or autonomy
  - Civil organization: Saint-Jean-Baptiste Society, Mouvement national des Québécois et des Québécoises (MNQ), Rassemblement pour l'indépendance du Québec (RIQ), Les Intellectuels pour la souveraineté (IPSO), Mouvement de libération nationale du Québec (MLNQ), Réseau de Résistance du Québécois (RRQ)
  - Political parties (secessionist): Parti Québécois, Bloc Québécois, Québec solidaire, Communist Party of Canada, Marxist–Leninist Party of Quebec, Climat Québec
  - Political parties (autonomist): Coalition Avenir Québec, Équipe Autonomiste

Saskatchewan

- Proposed: Independence for Saskatchewan
  - Political party: Buffalo Party of Saskatchewan
  - Advocacy group: Saskatchewan Prosperity Project

Vancouver Island

- Proposed: Breaking Vancouver Island off from British Columbia to create a new province or independence

Western Canada

Western Canada

- Proposed state: West Canada (includes Alberta, British Columbia, Manitoba, and Saskatchewan as well as (sometimes) Yukon, the Northwest Territories and Nunavut)
  - Political party: Maverick Party, Wildrose Independence Party of Alberta, Buffalo Party of Saskatchewan

== Colombia ==
San Andrés y Providencia

- Proposed state or autonomous area: Raizal State
  - Advocacy group: Archipelago Movement for Ethnic Native Self-Determination (AMEN-SD)

== Costa Rica ==
Limón Province

- Proposed: independence for Limón Province
  - Advocacy group: Limón Soberano

== Cuba ==
Isla de la Juventud

- Ethnic group: Mestizo
  - Proposed: independence or greater autonomy for Isla de la Juventud

== Denmark ==
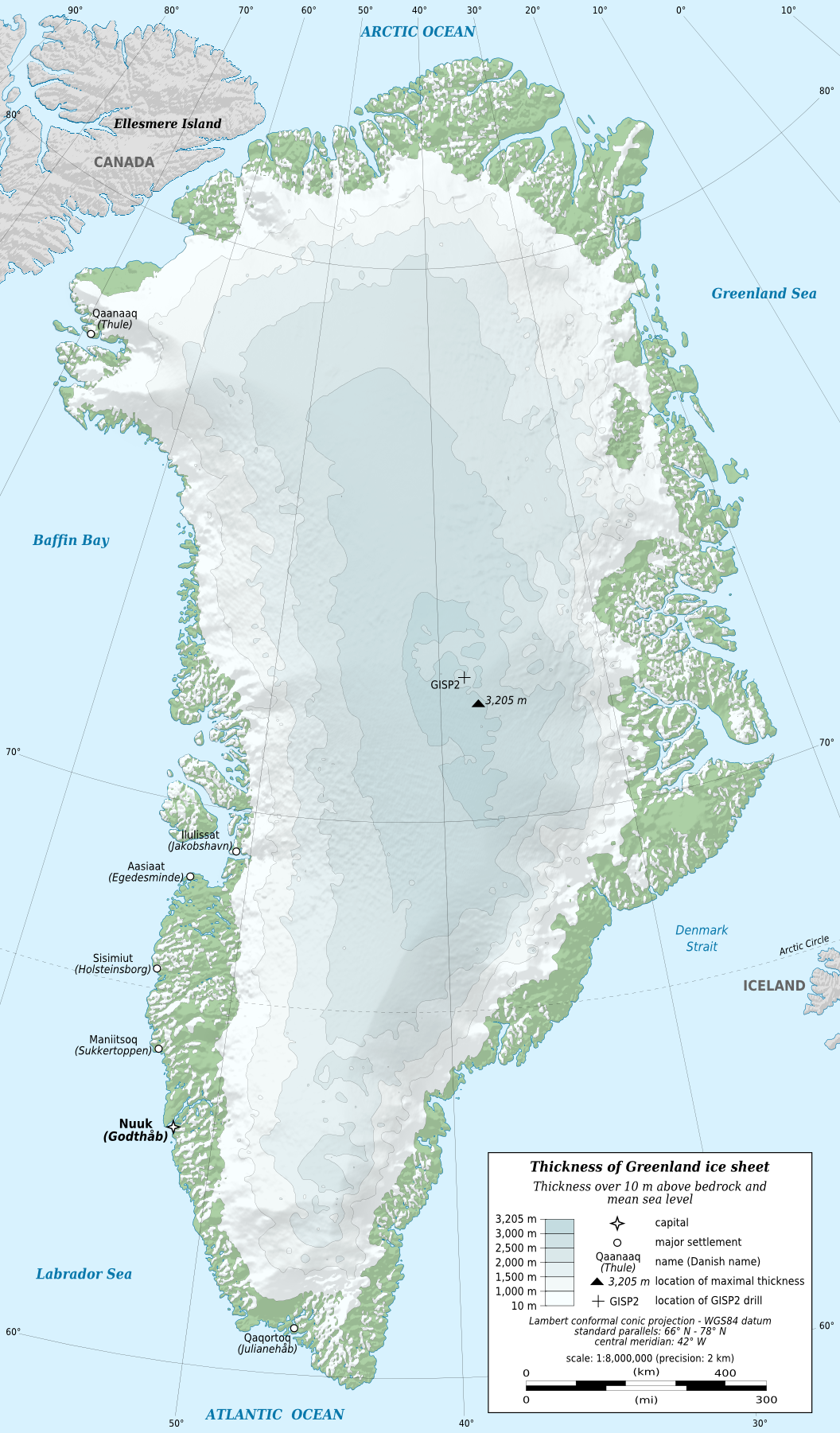
Map of Greenland

Greenland

- Ethnic group: Greenlandic Inuit, Danish Greenlanders, others
- Proposed: Independence for Greenland
  - Political parties: Inuit Ataqatigiit, Siumut, Naleraq and Nunatta Qitornai.

== Dominican Republic ==
Cibao

- Proposed state: República del Cibao or autonomy
  - Advocacy group: MiCibao

== France ==
Map of Guadeloupe

Map of Martinique

Guadeloupe

- Proposed state: Republic of Guadeloupe
  - Political parties: United Guadeloupe, Solidary and Responsible, Progressive Democratic Party of Guadeloupe
  - political party (autonomist): Guadeloupe Communist Party

Martinique

- Proposed state: Republic of Martinique
  - Political party: Martinican Independence Movement, Build the Martinique Country, Péyi-A
  - political party (autonomist): Martinican Progressive Party

== Grenada ==
Carriacou and Petite Martinique

- Proposed: greater autonomy for Carriacou and Petite Martinique

== Haiti ==
Gonâve Island

- Proposed state: Gonâve Island or autonomy
  - Advocacy group: La Gonâve en avant Jatibonicu Taino Tribal Nation

South Haiti

Grand'Anse, Sud, Sud-Est and Nippes

- Proposed: autonomy for south Haiti

== Honduras ==
Coastal Departments of Honduras

- Ethnic group: Garifuna
  - Proposed: autonomy for the Garifuna
  - Political party: Organización Fraternal Negra Hondureña

== Mexico ==
Autonomist movements

Zapatista

Chiapas

- Ethnic group: Mayans, Tzotzil
- De facto autonomous area: Rebel Zapatista Autonomous Municipalities
  - Militant organization: Zapatista Army of National Liberation

Triqui

- Ethnic group: Triqui
- Proposed autonomous area: Oaxaca
  - Militant organization: Movement for Triqui Autonomy

El Norte / Aridoamerica

- Ethnic groups: Norteño people
- Proposed state: Aridoamerican Confederacy
  - Advocate group: Proyecto Aridoamerica A.C. Partido Aridoamericano
- Proposed state: Royal Republic of Nuevo León
  - Advocacy group: National Anti-AMLO Front(FRENAA)

Baja California

- Proposed: independence for Baja California
  - Advocacy group: Sí Baja California

== Netherlands ==
Curaçao

- Proposed: Independence for Curaçao
  - Political parties: Movement for the Future of Curaçao, Sovereign People
  - Referendums: 1993 and 2005

Aruba

- Proposed: Independence for Aruba
  - Political party: People's Electoral Movement (Aruba)
  - Referendum: 1977

Sint Maarten

- Proposed: Independence, autonomy or unification with Saint Martin
  - Political party: Unified Resilient St. Maarten Movement
  - Referendums: 1994 and 2000

Bonaire

- Proposed: independence or autonomy for Bonaire
  - Political party: Bonaire Democratic Party

Saba

- Proposed: independence for Saba
  - Advocacy group: People's Party for Freedom and Democracy

== Nicaragua ==
Miskitu

- Ethnic group: Miskito people
- Proposed: Greater autonomy or Independence for Miskitu
  - Political party: General Assembly of the Council of Elders

== Panama ==
Madungandí

- Ethnic group: Guna people
  - Proposed: Establishment of a second Guna reserve
  - Advocates: Guna people

Bocas del Toro Province

- Ethnic group: Bribri people
  - Proposed: autonomy for the Bribri people in the Bocas del Toro Province
  - Advocacy group: Consejo General del Territorio Bribri

== Saint Kitts and Nevis ==
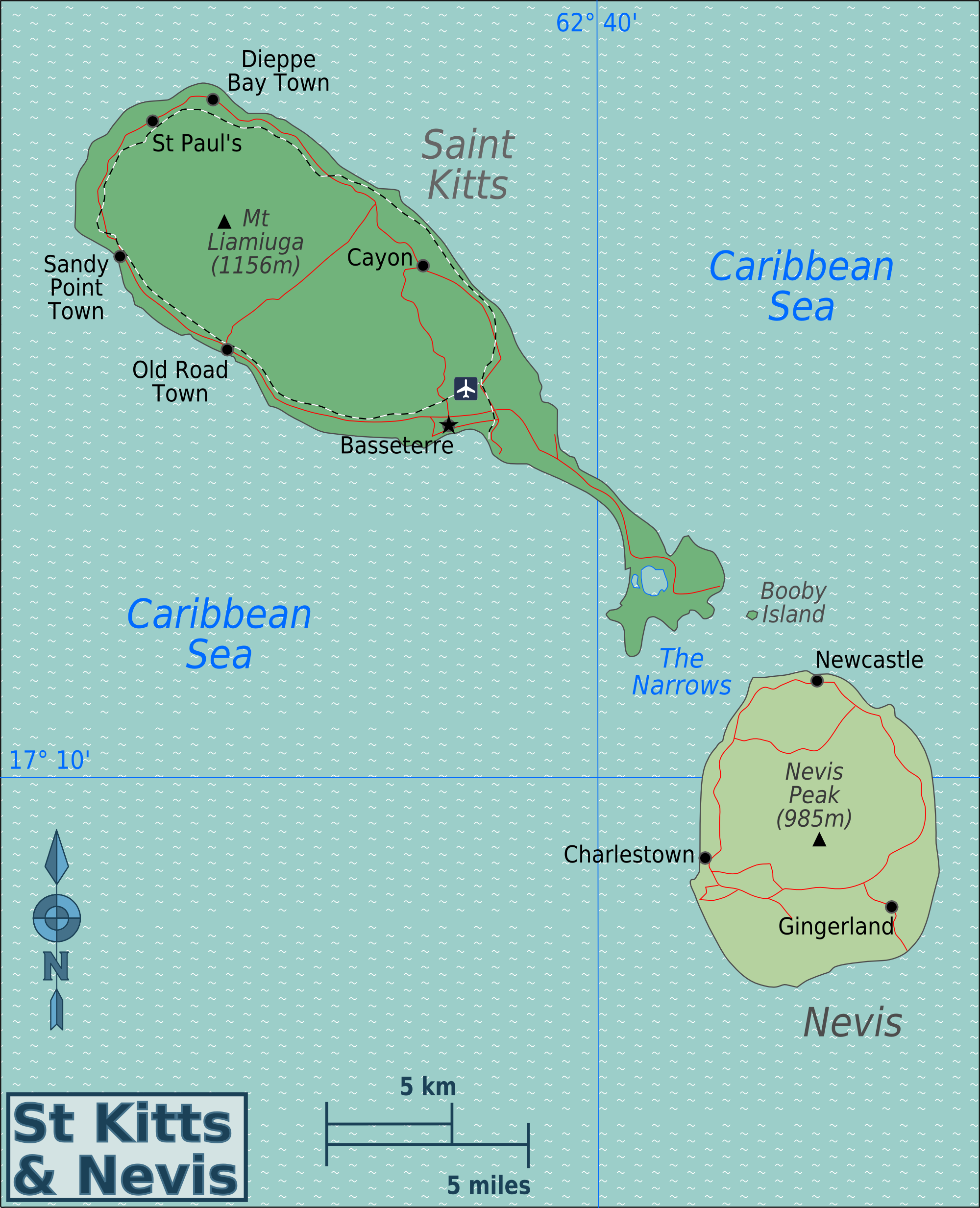
Nevis and the neighbour Saint Kitts island

Nevis

- Proposed: Greater autonomy for Nevis
  - Political parties: Nevis Reformation Party, Concerned Citizens' Movement

== Trinidad and Tobago ==
Tobago

- Proposed: Greater autonomy or independence for Tobago
  - Political party: Tobago Organisation of the People,Progressive Democratic Patriots,Tobago Forwards, One Tobago Voice

== United States ==
Alaska

Alaska

- Regional & ideological movement
- Proposed state: Republic of Alaska
  - Political party: Alaskan Party (1973-2025)

Aztlán

- Ethnic group: Chicano Movement, Chicano
- Proposed: Greater autonomy for Aztlán
  - Advocacy groups: MEChA (Movimiento Estudiantil Chicano de Aztlán, "Chicano Student Movement of Aztlán"), Freedom Road Socialist Organization, which calls for self-determination for the Chicano nation in Aztlan up to and including the right to secession.

California

California

- Proposed state or autonomous area: Second Californian Republic / New California or autonomy
  - Regional & ideological movement
  - Advocacy groups: Yes California, Californians for Independence
  - Political parties: California National Party, California Freedom Coalition

Cascadia

Boundaries of the Cascadia movement

- Proposed: Independence or Sovereignty for Cascadia
  - Advocacy group: Cascadia Department of Bioregion

Deseret

- Religious group: Mormons
- Proposed state or autonomous region: Deseret
  - Advocacy groups: Deseret nationalists (#DezNat)

Louisiana

- Regional & ideological movement
  - Proposed state: Louisiana
  - Advocacy group: Free Louisiana

Native Americans

- Proposed states and/or autonomous regions: Multiple
  - Advocacy groups: Lakota Freedom Movement, Mohawk Warrior Society, American Indian Movement, American Indian Movement of Colorado, International Indian Treaty Council, Red Power movement

Boundaries of the Republic of New Afrika

New Afrika

- Ethnic group: African Americans
- Proposed state or autonomous region: Republic of New Afrika
  - Advocacy group: Pan-Africanists Black Radical Congress, Moorish sovereign citizens, Nuwaubian Nation, Huey P. Newton Gun Club, Black Lives Matter (Factions)
  - Political parties: New Black Panther Party, African People's Socialist Party, Not Fucking Around Coalition, Black Hammer Party, Revolutionary Black Panther Party, Black Riders Liberation Party, Washitaw Nation

New England

- Regional & ideological movement
  - Proposed state: New England
  - Advocacy group: New England Independence Campaign

New Hampshire

- Regional & ideological movement
  - Proposed state: New Hampshire
  - Movement: NHEXIT
  - Political Parties: Libertarian Party of New Hampshire

Northwest Territorial Imperative

- Racial group: Whites
- Proposed state: Northwest American Republic

Southern US

Southern United States

- Proposed state or autonomous region: Confederate States of America or Southern United States or Dixie or Dixieland
  - Advocacy groups: League of the South, other neo-Confederate and non-confederate southern separatist groups.

Texas

- Proposed state or autonomous area: Republic of Texas
  - Texas independence movements seek independence for their state
  - Advocacy group: Texas Nationalist Movement

Vermont

- Proposed state or autonomous area: Vermont Republic
  - Political party: Vermont Independence Party Green Mountain Anarchist Collective (Anarchist)
  - Advocacy group: Second Vermont Republic

=== Territories ===
Puerto Rico

Puerto Rico

- Proposed: Independence, statehood, autonomy, independence under free association or reunification with Spain as an autonomous community
  - Political party: Puerto Rican Independence Party (PIP), Puerto Rican independence movement
  - Advocacy groups: Nationalist Party of Puerto Rico,Hostosian National Independence Movement(MINH), Socialist Front (FS), Movimiento Puertorriqueño Reunificacionista con España (MPRE)
  - Militant organization: Boricua Popular Army (Macheteros), Cadets of the Republic

Virgin Islands

- Proposed: Republic of the Virgin Islands or greater autonomy for the United States Virgin Islands or unification with the British Virgin Islands
  - Political party: Independent Citizens Movement

== United Kingdom ==
Bermuda

- Proposed state: Bermuda
  - Political party: Progressive Labour Party (Bermuda), Gombey Liberation Movement

== See also ==
- Alliance for Yucatan Party
- American Redoubt
- Christian exodus movement
- Diagolon, Canadian alt-right organization
- Inuit Nunangat
- Land Back
- Lists of active separatist movements
- Lists of historical separatist movements
- Nine Nations of North America – Divided into more cohesive cultural blocs.
- Northwest Territorial Imperative
- Republic of Florida Militia
