= White supremacy in the United States =

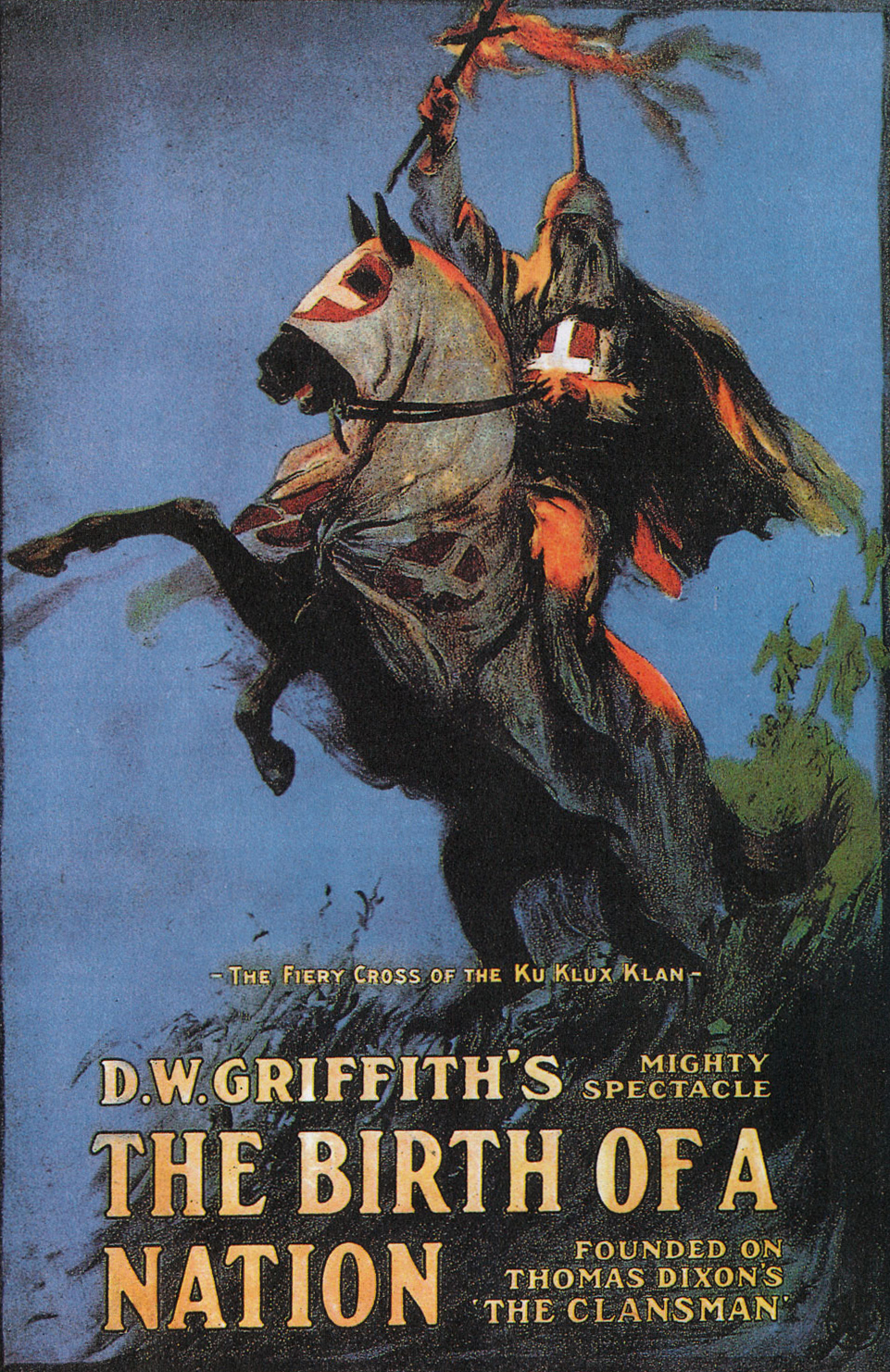
Poster for The Birth of a Nation (1915)

White supremacy in the United States traces to the origins of the country, and is closely associated with ideas of white nationalism. It is strongly linked to slavery in the United States, almost exclusively practiced by European colonists and White Americans enslaving other races, primarily African Americans. Enslavement of Africans intensified in the 1650s, reaching a population of four million prior to its abolition in 1865. After a brief liberalization in the Reconstruction era, white supremacy was largely restored by the Jim Crow laws, establishing racial segregation in the South, while the urban Black population in the North experienced institutional racism including racial wealth inequality. The civil rights movement in the 1950s and 1960s largely ended de jure segregation, but extensive de facto racism remained.

Slavery as an institution dates to the colonial period preceding the United States. Prior to the 1650s, the British Thirteen Colonies primarily enslaved Native Americans. After Native Americans suffered massive population losses from the importation of diseases from the Old World, Europeans began importing enslaved African people. The use of enslaved Africans in industrialized agriculture, that had developed in the Caribbean at the time, spread to the Colonial South. The ruling white planter class was disturbed by the 1675–1676 Bacon's Rebellion, which saw the European indentured servants unite with all classes of Africans. In response the Virginia Slave Codes of 1705 were enacted, socially segregated white colonists from black enslaved persons.

The Constitution of the United States emerged as a compromise between pro-slavery and anti-slavery factions in the North and South respectively. The planter class's harshness was worsened by the Haitian Revolution and massacre. Pseudoscientific beliefs were used to attempt to justify slavery in the 19th century. Contradiction between the First Industrial Revolution within the Northern United States and the agrarian plantation economy of the South, which was more predicated on white supremacy, led to conflict, beginning with the Bleeding Kansas confrontations and evolving into the American Civil War. During this war, President Abraham Lincoln made the Emancipation Proclamation, freeing slaves in the South. The postwar Thirteenth Amendment abolished slavery except as punishment for crime, the Fourteenth Amendment extended citizenship to all Africans born in the US, and the Fifteenth Amendment prohibited racial discrimination in the right to vote.

After a brief liberalization in the Reconstruction era, the Democratic Party largely restored white supremacy via the Jim Crow laws, establishing racial segregation in the South. The urban Black population in the North following the Great Migration was targeted with violence, exclusionary housing, redlining and racial steering. The analogous Juan Crow system and the 1882 Chinese Exclusion Act reflected white supremacy over Mexican Americans and Chinese Americans. The nadir of American race relations in the decades following Reconstruction's failure saw the Ku Klux Klan lead white mobs in lynchings and racial massacres.

== History ==
The emergence of white supremacy in the United States originated during the period of Spanish colonization, when European settlers engaged in the systematic elimination of Native American populations and inadvertently introduced infectious diseases that subsequently decimated Indigenous communities. The accumulation of wealth and establishment of racial dominance by European Americans in the United States was substantially facilitated through the systematic elimination of Native American populations and the forced labor exploitation of Black people.

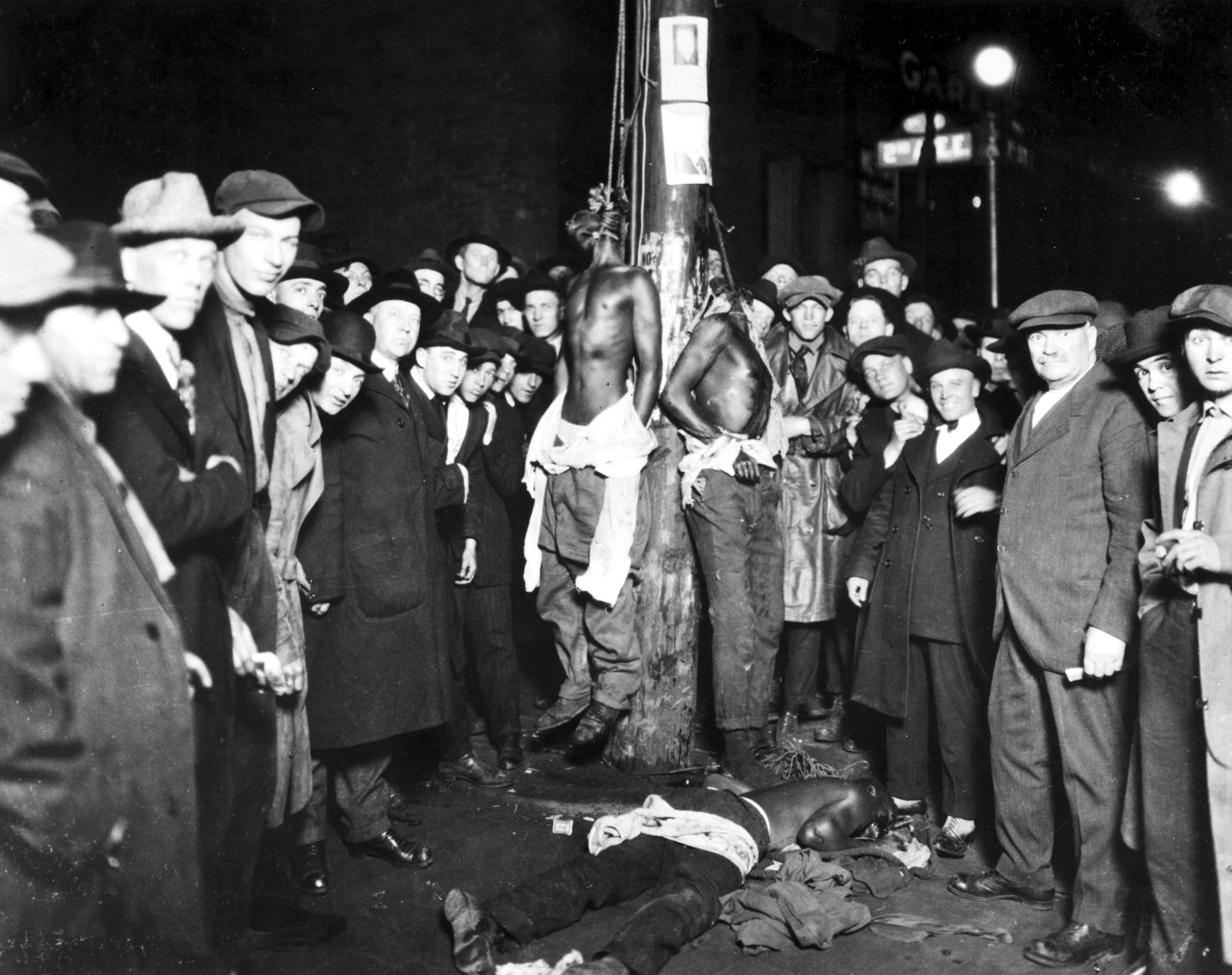
White men pose for a photograph of the 1920 Duluth, Minnesota lynchings. Two of the black victims are still hanging while the third is on the ground. Lynchings were often public spectacles for the white community to celebrate white supremacy in the U.S., and photos were often sold as postcards.

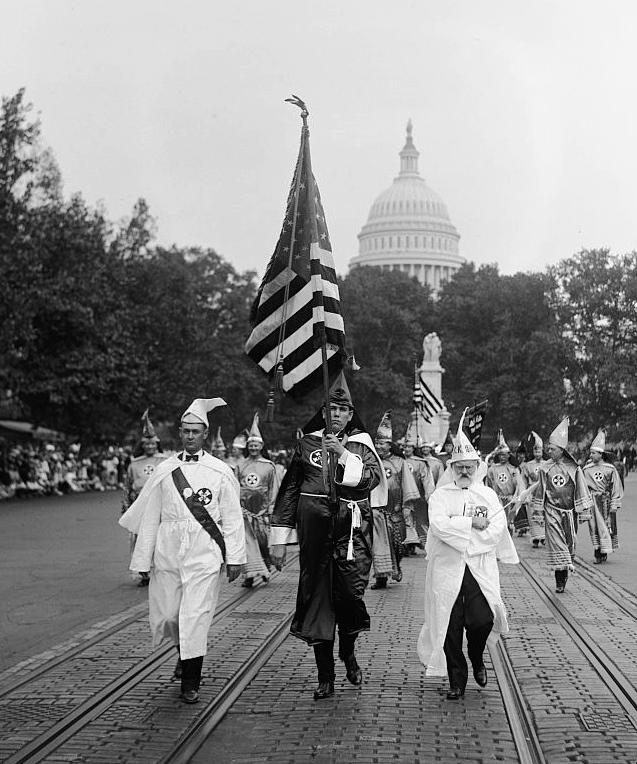
Ku Klux Klan parade in Washington, D.C. in 1926

=== Early history ===
White supremacy was dominant in the United States both before and after the American Civil War, and it persisted for decades after the Reconstruction Era. The Virginia Slave Codes of 1705 socially segregated white colonists from black enslaved persons, making them disparate groups and hindering their ability to unite. Unity of the commoners was a perceived fear of the Virginia aristocracy, who wished to prevent repeated events such as Bacon's Rebellion, occurring 29 years prior. Prior to the Civil War, many wealthy white Americans owned slaves; they tried to justify their economic exploitation of black people by creating a "scientific" theory of white superiority and black inferiority. One such slave owner, future president Thomas Jefferson, wrote in 1785 that blacks were "inferior to the whites in the endowments of body and mind."

The Naturalization Act of 1790 provided the first rules to be followed by the United States government in granting national citizenship. The Naturalization Act of 1790 (1 Stat. 103) limited U.S. citizenship and naturalization to immigrants who were "free white persons" of "good moral character". In some parts of the United States, many people who were considered non-white were disenfranchised, barred from government office, and prevented from holding most government jobs well into the second half of the 20th century. Professor Leland T. Saito of the University of Southern California writes: "Throughout the history of the United States, race has been used by whites for legitimizing and creating difference and social, economic and political exclusion."

In the antebellum South, four million slaves were denied freedom. In a 4 January 1848 speech to the Senate regarding the issue of whether or not to annex the entirety of Mexico after the Mexican-American war, John C. Calhoun of South Carolina said, "I know further, sir, that we have never dreamt of incorporating into our Union any but the Caucasian race—the free white race. To incorporate Mexico, would be the very first instance of the kind of incorporating an Indian race; for more than half of the Mexicans are Indians, and the other is composed chiefly of mixed tribes. I protest against such a union as that! Ours, sir, is the Government of a white race." In 1856, the U.S. Supreme Court ruled in the Dred Scott v. Sandford decision that free blacks descended from slaves could not hold United States citizenship even if they had been born in the country.

The outbreak of the Civil War saw the desire to uphold white supremacy being cited as a cause for state secession and the formation of the Confederate States of America.

=== Post-Civil War era ===
Major changes in this racial requirement for US citizenship were not made until the years which followed the American Civil War. In 1868, the Fourteenth Amendment to the United States Constitution was passed to grant birthright citizenship to black people born in the US, but it specifically excluded untaxed Indians, because they were separate nations. However, citizenship for other non-whites born in the US was not settled until 1898 with United States v. Wong Kim Ark, 169 U.S. 649, which concluded with an important precedent in its interpretation of the Citizenship Clause of the Fourteenth Amendment. This racial definition of American citizenship has had consequences for perceptions of American identity.

In an 1890 editorial about Native Americans and the American Indian Wars, author L. Frank Baum wrote: "The Whites, by law of conquest, by justice of civilization, are masters of the American continent, and the best safety of the frontier settlements will be secured by the total annihilation of the few remaining Indians."

==== KKK ====
Following the defeat of the Confederate States of America and the abolition of slavery in the United States at the end of the American Civil War, the Ku Klux Klan (KKK) was founded as an insurgent group with the goal of maintaining the Southern racial system throughout the Reconstruction Era. The creation of this group was able to instill fear in African Americans while, in some cases, filling white Americans with pride in their race and reassurance in the fact that they will stay 'on top'. The message they gave to people around them was that, even though the Confederate States did not exist anymore, the same principle remained in their minds: whites were superior. Although the first incarnation of the KKK was focused on maintaining the Antebellum South, its second incarnation in the 1915-1940s period was much more oriented towards white nationalism and American nativism, with slogans such as "One Hundred Percent Americanism" and "America for Americans", in which "Americans" were understood to be white and Protestant. The 1915 film The Birth of a Nation is an example of an allegorical invocation of white nationalism during this time, and its positive portrayal of the first KKK is considered to be one of the factors which led to the emergence of the second KKK.

The second KKK was founded in Atlanta, Georgia, in 1915 and, starting in 1921, it adopted a modern business system of recruiting. The organization grew rapidly nationwide at a time of prosperity. Reflecting the social tensions of urban industrialization and vastly increased immigration, its membership grew most rapidly in cities and spread out of the South to the Midwest and West. The second KKK called for strict morality and better enforcement of prohibition. Its rhetoric promoted anti-Catholicism and nativism. Some local groups took part in attacks on private houses and carried out other violent activities. The violent episodes were generally in the South.

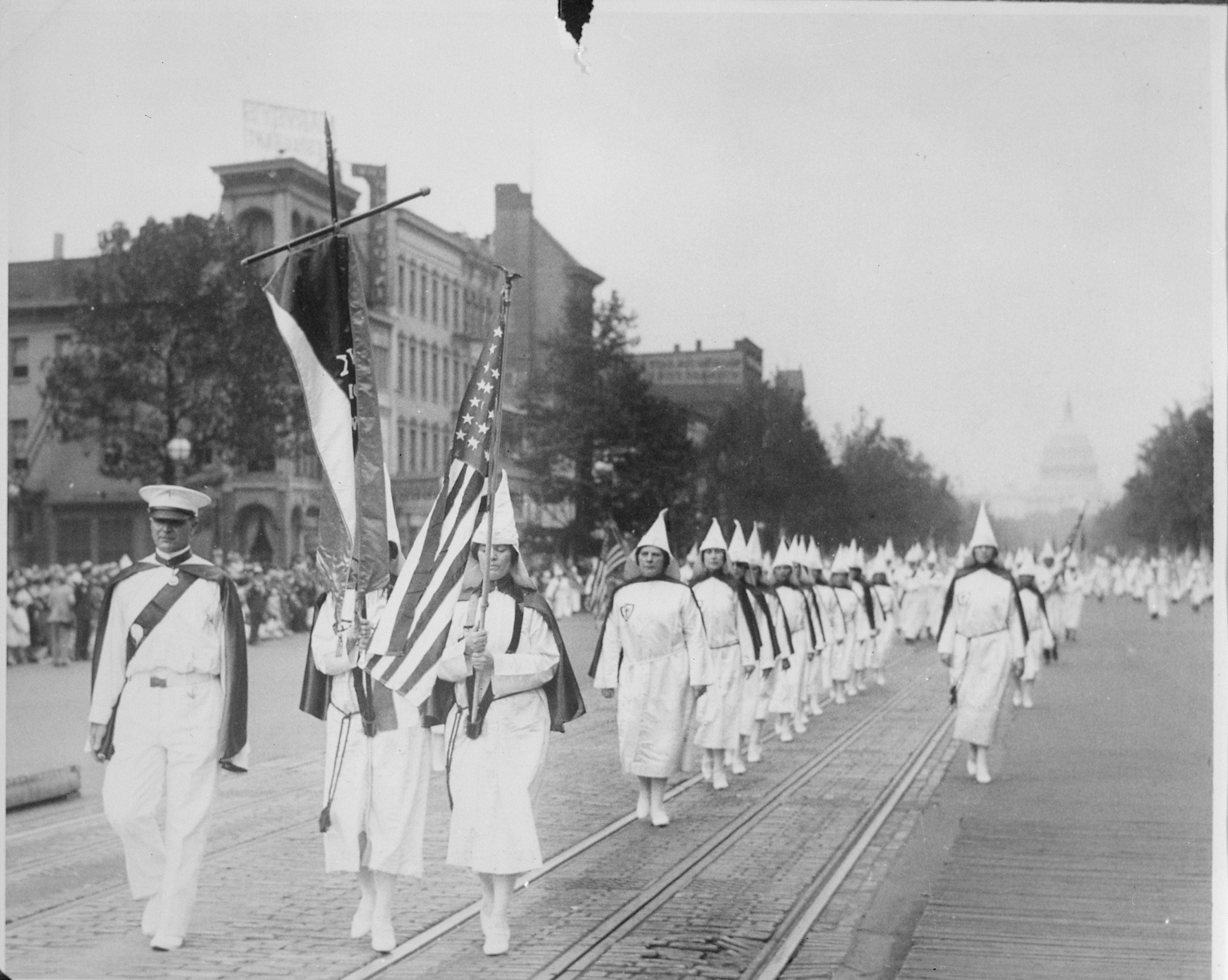
Ku Klux Klan members march down Pennsylvania Avenue in Washington, D.C., in 1928.

The second KKK was a formal fraternal organization, with a national and state structure. At its peak in the mid-1920s, the organization claimed to include about 15% of the nation's eligible population, approximately 4 to 5 million men. Internal divisions, criminal behavior by leaders, and external opposition brought about a collapse in membership, which had dropped to about 30,000 by 1930. It faded away in the 1940s.

=== Later 20th century ===
The denial of social and political freedom to minorities continued into the mid-20th century, resulting in the civil rights movement. The movement was spurred by the lynching of Emmett Till, a 14-year-old boy. David Jackson writes it was the image of the "murdered child's ravaged body, that forced the world to reckon with the brutality of American racism." Vann R. Newkirk II wrote "the trial of his killers became a pageant illuminating the tyranny of white supremacy." Moved by the image of Till's body in the casket, one hundred days after his murder Rosa Parks refused to give up her seat on a bus to a white person.

Sociologist Stephen Klineberg has stated that U.S. immigration laws prior to 1965 clearly "declared that Northern Europeans are a superior subspecies of the white race". (Note: This quote is by Klineberg in the NPR story, not from the text of any US law.) The Immigration and Nationality Act of 1965 opened entry to the U.S. to non-Germanic groups, and significantly altered the demographic mix in the U.S. as a result. With 38 U.S. states having banned interracial marriage through anti-miscegenation laws, the last 16 states had such laws in place until 1967 when they were invalidated by the Supreme Court of the United States' decision in Loving v. Virginia. These mid-century gains had a major impact on white Americans' political views; segregation and white racial superiority, which had been publicly endorsed in the 1940s, became minority views within the white community by the mid-1970s, and continued to decline in 1990s' polls to a single-digit percentage. For sociologist Howard Winant, these shifts marked the end of "monolithic white supremacy" in the United States.

Starting in the 1960s, white nationalism grew in the US as the conservative movement developed in mainstream society. Samuel P. Huntington argues that it developed as a reaction to a perceived decline in the essence of American identity as European, Anglo-Protestant and English-speaking. The Immigration and Nationality Act of 1965 had opened entry to the US to immigrants other than traditional Northern European and Germanic groups, and as a result it would significantly, and unintentionally, alter the demographic mix in the US. The civil rights movement and growing support for multiculturalism would also be contributing factors.

The slogan "white power" was popularized by American Nazi Party leader George Lincoln Rockwell, who used the term in a debate with Stokely Carmichael of the Black Panther Party after Carmichael issued a call for "black power". Rockwell advocated a return to white control of all American institutions, and violently opposed any minority advancement. He rejected the Nazi idea of "master race", however, and accepted all white European nationalities in his ideology, including Turks.

After the mid-1960s, white supremacy remained an important ideology to the American far-right. According to Kathleen Belew, a historian of race and racism in the United States, white militancy shifted after the Vietnam War from supporting the existing racial order to a more radical position (self-described as "white power" or "white nationalism") committed to overthrowing the United States government and establishing a white homeland. Such anti-government militia organizations are one of three major strands of violent right-wing movements in the United States, with white-supremacist groups (such as the Ku Klux Klan, neo-Nazi organizations, and racist skinheads) and a religious fundamentalist movement (such as Christian Identity) being the other two. Howard Winant writes that, "On the far right the cornerstone of white identity is belief in an ineluctable, unalterable racialized difference between whites and nonwhites." In the view of philosopher Jason Stanley, white supremacy in the United States is an example of the fascist politics of hierarchy, in that it "demands and implies a perpetual hierarchy" in which whites dominate and control non-whites.

One influential white nationalist in the United States was William Luther Pierce, who founded the National Alliance in 1974.

In the United States a movement calling for white separatism emerged in the 1980s. Leonard Zeskind has chronicled the movement in his book Blood and Politics, in which he argues that it has moved from the "margins to the mainstream".

=== 21st century ===
==== Obama presidency ====
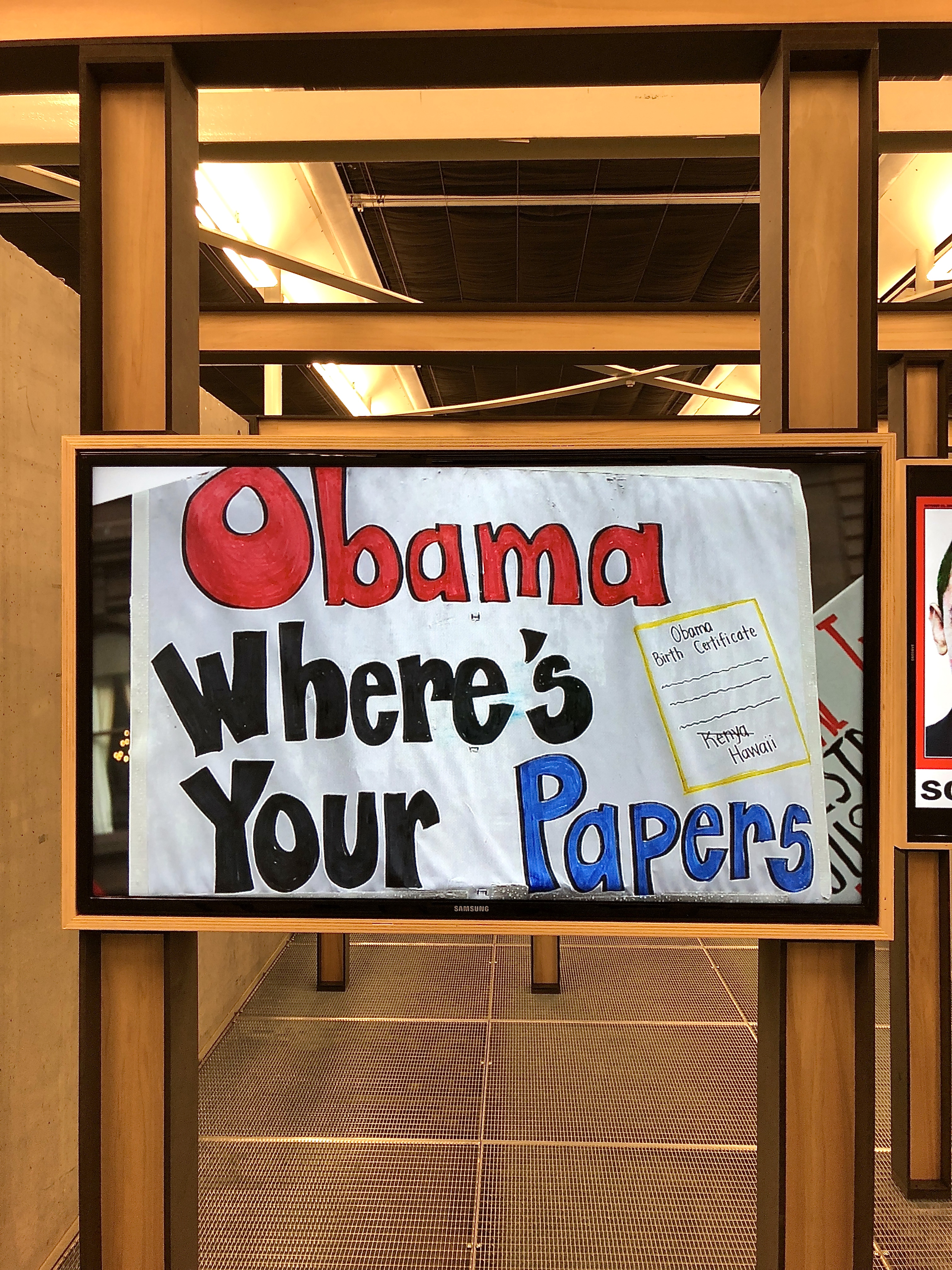
An example of birtherism, a movement to question President Obama's American citizenship and legitimacy

The 2008 election of Barack Obama, constituting the first time that a nonwhite person had become President, heightened white nationalist fears. His time in office was followed by the first election of Donald Trump in 2016.

In the 2010s, the alt-right, a broad term covering many different far-right ideologies and groups in the United States, some of which endorse white nationalism, gained traction as an alternative to mainstream conservatism in its national politics.

==== First Trump presidency ====
The presidential campaign of Donald Trump led to a surge of interest in white supremacy and white nationalism in the United States, bringing increased media attention and new members to their movement; his campaign enjoyed their widespread support.

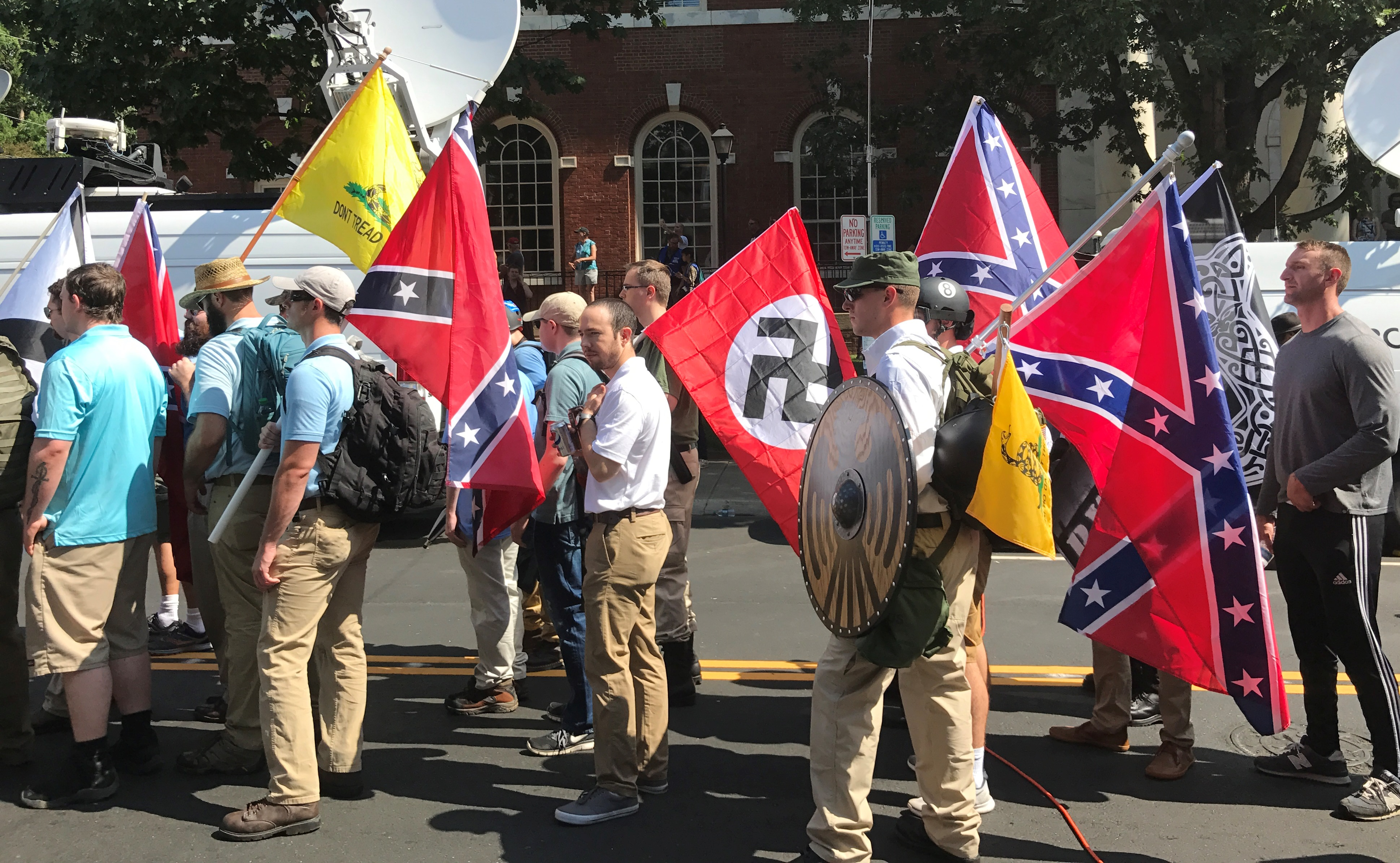
Alt-right members preparing to enter Emancipation Park during the Unite the Right rally holding Nazi, Confederate, and Gadsden flags.

Some academics argue that outcomes from the 2016 United States Presidential Election reflect ongoing challenges with white supremacy. Psychologist Janet Helms suggested that the normalizing behaviors of social institutions of education, government, and healthcare are organized around the "birthright of...the power to control society's resources and determine the rules for [those resources]". Educators, literary theorists, and other political experts have raised similar questions, connecting the scapegoating of disenfranchised populations to white superiority. In both August 2017 and August 2018 white supremacy Unite the Right rallies were held in the United States that included participants of the alt-right, neo-Confederates, neo-fascists, white nationalists, white supremacists, neo-Nazis, Klansmen, and far-right militias.

As of 2018, there were over 600 white-supremacist organizations recorded in the U.S. On July 23, 2019, Christopher A. Wray, the head of the FBI, said at a Senate Judiciary Committee hearing that the agency had made around 100 domestic terrorism arrests since October 1, 2018, and that the majority of them were connected in some way with white supremacy. Wray said that the Bureau was "aggressively pursuing [domestic terrorism] using both counterterrorism resources and criminal investigative resources and partnering closely with our state and local partners," but said that it was focused on the violence itself and not on its ideological basis. A similar number of arrests had been made for instances of international terrorism. In the past, Wray has said that white supremacy was a significant and "pervasive" threat to the U.S.

On September 20, 2019, the acting Secretary of Homeland Security, Kevin McAleenan, announced his department's revised strategy for counter-terrorism, which included a new emphasis on the dangers inherent in the white-supremacy movement. McAleenan called white supremacy one of the most "potent ideologies" behind domestic terrorism-related violent acts. In a speech at the Brookings Institution, McAleenan cited a series of high-profile shooting incidents, and said "In our modern age, the continued menace of racially based violent extremism, particularly white supremacist extremism, is an abhorrent affront to the nation, the struggle and unity of its diverse population." The new strategy will include better tracking and analysis of threats, sharing information with local officials, training local law enforcement on how to deal with shooting events, discouraging the hosting of hate sites online, and encouraging counter-messages.

In 2019, the Democratic-led U.S. House of Representatives passed an amendment to the National Defense Authorization Act for Fiscal Year 2020 to study whether it would be possible to screen military enlistees for "white nationalist" beliefs. However, the Republican-controlled U.S. Senate eliminated those words before passing the bill, expanding the wording to "extremist and gang-related activity", rather than specifically referencing white nationalism.

In a 2020 article in The New York Times titled "How White Women Use Themselves as Instruments of Terror", columnist Charles M. Blow wrote:

We often like to make white supremacy a testosterone-fueled masculine expression, but it is just as likely to wear heels as a hood. Indeed, untold numbers of lynchings were executed because white women had claimed that a black man raped, assaulted, talked to or glanced at them. The Tulsa race massacre, the destruction of Black Wall Street, was spurred by an incident between a white female elevator operator and a black man. As the Oklahoma Historical Society points out, the most common explanation is that he stepped on her toe. As many as 300 people were killed because of it. The torture and murder of 14-year-old Emmett Till in 1955, a lynching actually, occurred because a white woman said that he "grabbed her and was menacing and sexually crude toward her". This practice, this exercise in racial extremism has been dragged into the modern era through the weaponizing of 9-1-1, often by white women, to invoke the power and force of the police who they are fully aware are hostile to black men. This was again evident when a white woman in New York's Central Park told a black man, a bird-watcher, that she was going to call the police and tell them that he was threatening her life.

Reactions to the COVID-19 pandemic were conditioned by the level of white Christian nationalist sentiment among Americans, with those who leaned more in this direction seeing the consequences of the pandemic through a more xenophobic and victim-blaming lens.

=== Biden presidency ===
In the leadup to the second presidency of Donald Trump, a YouGov poll showed that 44% of Americans believed that he personally supports white nationalism. Amnesty International USA proclaimed Trump's first week in office as a rollout of white supremacist policies.

=== Second Trump presidency ===
In 2026, on July 4th, White nationalist group Patriot Front marched in Washington DC.

== Patterns of influence ==
=== Political violence ===
The Tuskegee Institute has estimated that 3,446 blacks were the victims of lynchings in the United States between 1882 and 1968, with the peak occurring in the 1890s at a time of economic stress in the South and increasing political suppression of blacks. If 1,297 whites were also lynched during this period, blacks were disproportionally targeted, representing 72.7% of all people lynched. According to scholar Amy L. Wood, "lynching photographs constructed and perpetuated white supremacist ideology by creating permanent images of a controlled white citizenry juxtaposed to images of helpless and powerless black men."

=== School curriculum ===
White supremacy has also played a part in U.S. school curriculum. Over the course of the 19th, 20th, and 21st centuries, material across the spectrum of academic disciplines has been taught with a heavy emphasis on white culture, contributions, and experiences, and a lack of representation of non-white groups' perspectives and accomplishments. In the 19th century, Geography lessons contained teachings on a fixed racial hierarchy, which white people topped. Mills (1994) writes that history as it is taught is really the history of white people, and it is taught in a way that favors white Americans and white people in general. He states that the language used to tell history minimizes the violent acts committed by white people over the centuries, citing the use of the words, for example, "discovery," "colonization," and "New World" when describing what was ultimately a European conquest of the Western Hemisphere and its indigenous peoples. Swartz (1992) seconds this reading of modern history narratives when it comes to the experiences, resistances, and accomplishments of black Americans throughout the Middle Passage, slavery, Reconstruction, Jim Crow, and the civil rights movement. In an analysis of American history textbooks, she highlights word choices that repetitively "normalize" slavery and the inhumane treatment of black people. She also notes the frequent showcasing of white abolitionists and actual exclusion of black abolitionists and the fact that black Americans had been mobilizing for abolition for centuries before the major white American push for abolition in the 19th century. She ultimately asserts the presence of a masternarrative that centers Europe and its associated peoples (white people) in school curriculum, particularly as it pertains to history. She writes that this masternarrative condenses history into only history that is relevant to, and to some extent beneficial for, white Americans.

Elson (1964) provides detailed information about the historic dissemination of simplistic and negative ideas about non-white races. Native Americans, who were subjected to attempts of cultural genocide by the U.S. government through the use of American Indian boarding schools, were characterized as homogenously "cruel," a violent menace toward white Americans, and lacking civilization or societal complexity (p. 74). For example, in the 19th century, black Americans were consistently portrayed as lazy, immature, and intellectually and morally inferior to white Americans, and in many ways not deserving of equal participation in U.S. society. For example, a math problem in a 19th-century textbook read, "If 5 white men can do as much work as 7 negroes..." implying that white men are more industrious and competent than black men (p. 99). In addition, little to nothing was taught about black Americans' contributions, or their histories before being brought to U.S. soil as slaves. According to Wayne (1972), this approach was taken especially much after the Civil War to maintain whites' hegemony over emancipated black Americans. Other racial groups have received oppressive treatment, including Mexican Americans, who temporarily were prevented from learning the same curriculum as white Americans because they supposedly were intellectually inferior, and Asian Americans, some of whom were prevented from learning much about their ancestral lands because they were deemed a threat to "American" culture, i.e. white culture, at the turn of the 20th century.

=== Role of the Internet ===
With the emergence of Twitter in 2006, and platforms such as Stormfront, which was launched in 1996, an alt-right portal for white supremacists with similar beliefs, both adults and children, was provided in which they were given a way to connect. Jessie Daniels, of CUNY-Hunter College, discussed the emergence of other social media outlets such as 4chan and Reddit, which meant that the "spread of white nationalist symbols and ideas could be accelerated and amplified." Sociologist Kathleen Blee notes that the anonymity which the Internet provides can make it difficult to track the extent of white-supremacist activity in the country, but nevertheless she and other experts see an increase in the number of hate crimes and amount of white-supremacist violence. In the latest wave of white supremacy, in the age of the Internet, Blee sees the movement as having become primarily a virtual one, in which divisions between groups become blurred: "[A]ll these various groups that get jumbled together as the alt-right and people who have come in from the more traditional neo-Nazi world. We're in a very different world now."

David Duke, a former Grand Wizard of the Ku Klux Klan, wrote in 1999 that the Internet was going to create a "chain reaction of racial enlightenment that will shake the world." Daniels documents that racist groups see the Internet as a way to spread their ideologies, influence others and gain supporters. Legal scholar Richard Hasen describes a "dark side" of social media:

There certainly were hate groups before the Internet and social media. [But with social media] it just becomes easier to organize, to spread the word, for people to know where to go. It could be to raise money, or it could be to engage in attacks on social media. Some of the activity is virtual. Some of it is in a physical place. Social media has lowered the collective-action problems that individuals who might want to be in a hate group would face. You can see that there are people out there like you. That's the dark side of social media.

The Andrew Show, a series on YouTube hosted by the grandson of Thomas Robb, the national director of the Knights of the Ku Klux Klan, "presents the Klan's ideology in a format aimed at kids — more specifically, white kids." The short episodes inveigh against race-mixing, and extol other white-supremacist ideologies. A short documentary published by TRT describes Imran Garda's experience, a journalist of Indian descent, who met with Thomas Robb and a traditional KKK group. A sign that greets people who enter the town states "Diversity is a code for white genocide." The KKK group interviewed in the documentary summarizes its ideals, principles, and beliefs, which are emblematic of white supremacists in the United States. The comic book super hero Captain America was used for dog whistle politics by the alt-right in college campus recruitment in 2017, an ironic co-opting because Captain America battled against Nazis in the comics, and was created by Jewish cartoonists.

== Statistics ==
=== Opinions ===
In 2016, the American National Election Studies survey conducted during Donald Trump's campaign for the presidency found that 38% of Americans expressed "strong feelings of white solidarity", 28% "strong feelings of white identity", 27% that whites suffer from discrimination in American society, while 6% agree with all these propositions.

In a July 2021 Morning Consult Poll found that among Republican-leaning male voters, 23 percent responded that they have a favorable view of white nationalist groups; 11 percent of Republican men surveyed said they have a "very favorable" view while 12 percent said they are only "somewhat". With Democrat men it was 17 percent who said they have some form of "favorable" view of white nationalist groups.

Also in 2021, polls conducted by DHM Research and the Oregon Values and Beliefs Center found that in the state of Oregon, nearly four in 10 respondents strongly or somewhat agree with statements that reflect core arguments of white nationalism. In 2018, 31 percent believed that America had to protect or preserve its White European heritage, while in 2021 it went up to 40 percent.

=== Participation ===
2017 Unite the Right rally in Charlottesville, Virginia

In 2020, it was reported that white nationalist groups leaving flyers, stickers, banners and posters in public places more than doubled from 1,214 in 2018 to 2,713 in 2019.

According to journalist David D. Kirkpatrick, as of mid-2024, scholars of the far right estimate that 100,000 Americans "actively participate in organized white nationalist groups".

=== Future ===
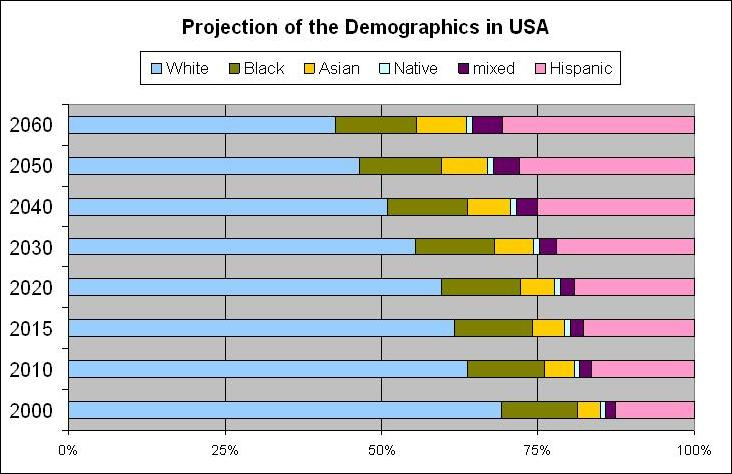

White nationalists are opposed to the coming mid-21st century majority-minority status of the United States.

== Culture ==
=== Interpretations of white nationalism ===
The flag of the Confederate States of America, representing the southern states that separated during the Civil War, is often held up as a symbol of white heritage alongside other historical American flags

During the 1980s the United States saw an increase in the number of esoteric subcultures within white nationalism. According to Nicholas Goodrick-Clarke, these movements cover a wide variety of mutually influencing groups of a radically ethnocentric character which have emerged, especially in the English-speaking world, since World War II. These loose networks use a variety of mystical, occult or religious approaches in a defensive affirmation of white identity against modernity, liberalism, immigration, multiracialism, and multiculturalism. Some are neo-fascist, neo-Nazi or Third Positionist; others are politicised around some form of white ethnic nationalism or identity politics, and a few have national anarchist tendencies. One example is the neo-tribalist paganism promoted by Else Christensen's Odinist Fellowship. Especially notable is the prevalence of devotional forms and esoteric themes, so these subcultures often have the character of new religious movements.

Included under the same umbrella by Goodrick-Clarke are movements ranging from conservative revolutionary schools of thought (Nouvelle Droite, European New Right, Evolian Traditionalism) to white supremacist and white separatist interpretations of Christianity and paganism (Christian Identity, Creativity, Nordic racial paganism) to neo-Nazi subcultures (Esoteric Hitlerism, Nazi Satanism, National Socialist black metal).

North Idaho state representative Heather Scott—who in 2015 had paraded with a Confederate battle flag—in 2017 attempted to distinguish "white supremacy" from "white nationalism", claiming that the former was characterized by "extreme racism" and "violent acts" while the latter was merely nationalism by people who happen to be white, i.e. in her personal use of the term, a white nationalist is "no more than a Caucasian who [sic] for the Constitution and making America great again." Scott's interpretation of the term was rejected as "incorrect" by University of Idaho sociology professor Kristin Haltinner and as "patently false" by Vanderbilt University sociology professor Sophie Bjork-James.

While white nationalism prizes demographic dominance and societal power, some of its supporters are attracted simply because they seek to reverse cultural change in society.

=== Impact on society ===
Historically, white nationalists have pushed for the creation of Confederate monuments to push back at times of racial progress, such as Reconstruction and the civil rights movement.

In the aftermath of the September 11 attacks in 2001, white nationalism became more prevalent in popular culture and government-sanctioned culture. The comic book super hero Captain America, in an ironic co-optation, has been used for dog whistle politics by the alt-right in college campus recruitment in 2017.

White nationalism has also been found in other cultural movements, such as punk rock and the wellness movement.

== Race relations ==
People of color have been found to be concerned about Christian nationalism and its ties to white supremacy. A few of them support white nationalism and supremacy due to complicated historical factors such as colonialism, as well as the need to maintain their societal status in the modern day.

=== African Americans ===
White nationalism became more intense among Southerners after the Civil War due to the conflict with the North and its relation to emancipating the slaves. Thomas Jefferson, the third President, once wrote on the subject of post-slavery white-black relations that "[d]eep rooted prejudices entertained by the whites" and "ten thousand recollections, by the blacks, of the injuries they have sustained" would make coexistence impossible.

=== Asian Americans ===
In response to the success of Asian-heritage people in the tech industry (where they constitute many of the CEOs), Steve Bannon, a former advisor to Trump, argued: "A country is more than an economy. We're a civic society."

Some conservative Asian Americans have been argued to be complicit with white nationalism in the sense of acting against other minority groups' advancement and needs. Hindu nationalists have sometimes allied with white nationalists in the United States.

=== Hispanic and Latino Americans ===
A few Hispanics have become attracted to white nationalism, due to their own significant white ancestry and discrimination against other groups.

=== Middle Eastern and North African Americans ===
Though Middle Eastern-origin peoples have been legally classified as white, they face racial prejudice and Islamophobia regardless, with some campaigning to include Middle Eastern and North African (MENA) Americans as a separate category in the census.

A 2020 survey of MENA showed that they considered white nationalism to be the biggest threat facing the United States.

=== Native Americans ===
Territorial evolution and proposed annexations by the United States in North America

Historically, several Indigenous nations were absorbed into the United States by white settlers. In the modern day, some white nationalists oppose the sovereignty or autonomy of these peoples through legal means. Other white nationalists argue that akin to Indigenous people, they also have the right to oppose modern-day immigration and invasion.

=== White non-nationalists ===
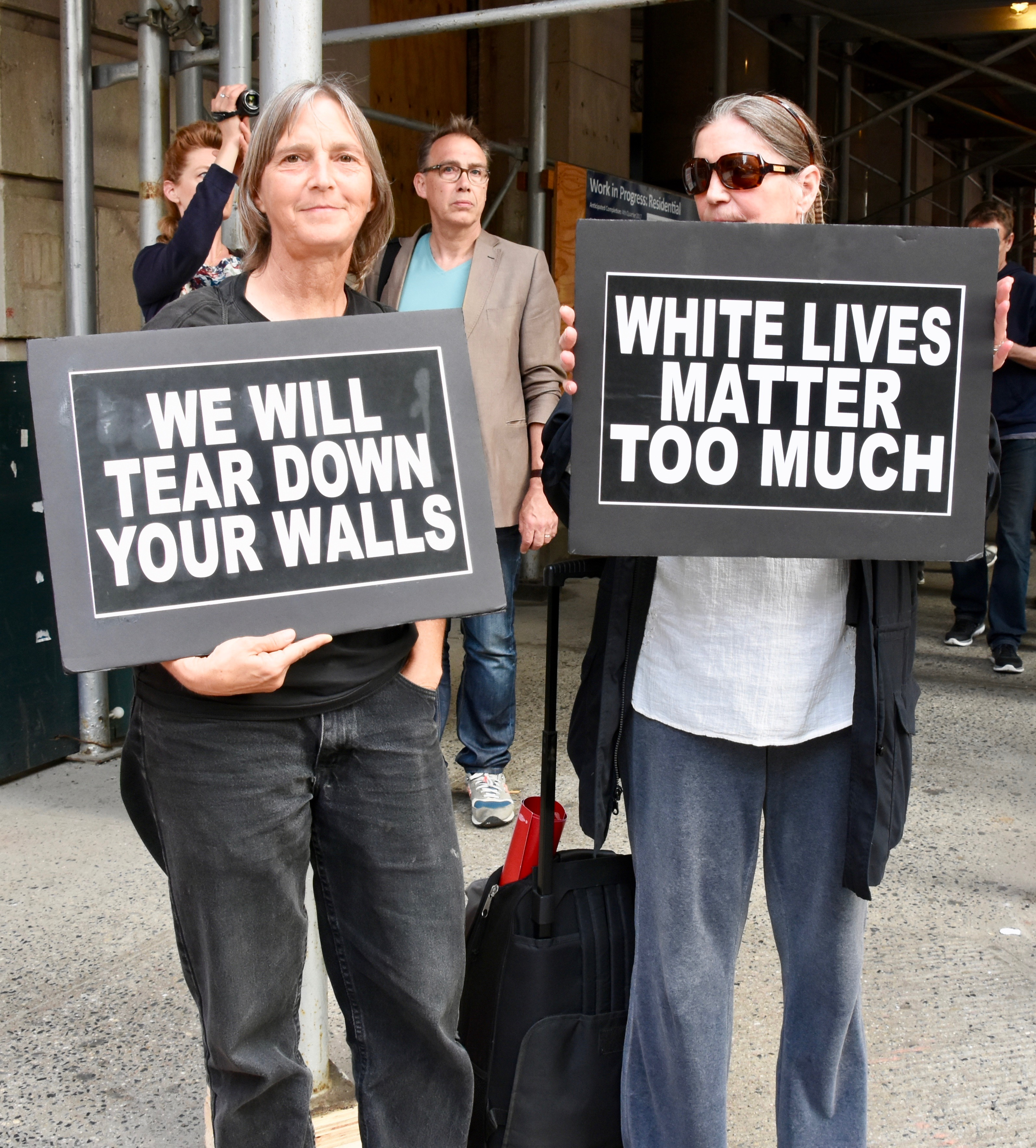
Response to White Lives Matter

At the turn of the 20th century, a wave of European immigration challenged white American demographics as understood at the time, because the new arrivals came from regions that had not historically been part of the nation's ethnic stock. While some white people supported an expansion of the white demographic through the melting pot mechanism, others aimed to purify American whiteness by bringing previously discriminated-against American groups such as the mountain peoples of Appalachia into the mainstream. During the era of the KKK, several opponents of white nationalism fought for racial justice.

In the early 21st century, a greater level of white support for racial equality has contended with a rising white nationalist movement, producing greater frictions.

== Politics ==
=== 2016 Trump presidential campaign ===
From the outset of his campaign, Donald Trump was endorsed by various white nationalist and white supremacist movements and leaders, (who were attracted to his accusation that Barack Obama was born in Africa, his denigration of immigrants as "criminals and rapists", of "shithole countries" in Africa and the Caribbean, and more recently that there is "a definite anti-white feeling" in the United States that he would correct, according to journalist David D. Kirkpatrick). On 24 February 2016, David Duke, a former Ku Klux Klan Grand Dragon, expressed vocal support for Trump's campaign on his radio show. Shortly thereafter in an interview with Jake Tapper, Trump repeatedly claimed to be ignorant of Duke and his support. Republican presidential rivals were quick to respond on his wavering, and Senator Marco Rubio stated the Duke endorsement made Trump unelectable. Others questioned his professed ignorance of Duke by pointing out that in 2000, Trump called him a "Klansman". Trump later blamed the incident on a poor earpiece he was given by CNN. Later the same day Trump stated that he had previously disavowed Duke in a tweet posted with a video on his Twitter account. On 3 March 2016, Trump stated: "David Duke is a bad person, who I disavowed on numerous occasions over the years. I disavowed him. I disavowed the KKK."

On 22 July 2016 (the day after Trump's nomination), Duke announced that he will be a candidate for the Republican nomination for the United States Senate election in Louisiana. He commented, "I'm overjoyed to see Donald Trump and most Americans embrace most of the issues that I've championed for years." A spokesperson for the Trump campaign said Trump "has disavowed David Duke and will continue to do so."

On 25 August 2016, Hillary Clinton gave a speech saying that Trump is "taking hate groups mainstream and helping a radical fringe take over the Republican Party." She identified this radical fringe with the "alt-right", a largely online variation of American far-right that embraces white nationalism and is anti-immigration. During the election season, the alt-right movement "evangelized" online in support of racist and anti-semitic ideologies. Clinton noted that Trump's campaign chief executive Stephen Bannon described his Breitbart News Network as "the platform for the alt-right". On 9 September 2016, several leaders of the alt-right community held a press conference, described by one reporter as the "coming-out party" of the little-known movement, to explain their goals. They affirmed their racialist beliefs, stating "Race is real, race matters, and race is the foundation of identity." Speakers called for a "White Homeland" and expounded on racial differences in intelligence. They also confirmed their support of Trump, saying "This is what a leader looks like."

Richard B. Spencer, who ran the white nationalist National Policy Institute, said, "Before Trump, our identity ideas, national ideas, they had no place to go". Spencer also referred to media as "Lügenpresse" in a speech he ended with "Hail Trump! Hail our people! Hail victory!" to an audience that responded with Nazi salutes. The editor of the neo-Nazi website The Daily Stormer stated, "Virtually every alt-right Nazi I know is volunteering for the Trump campaign." Rocky Suhayda, chairman of the American Nazi Party said that although Trump "isn't one of us", his election would be a "real opportunity" for the white nationalist movement.

The Southern Poverty Law Center monitored Trump's campaign throughout the election and noted several instances where Trump and lower-level surrogates either used white nationalist rhetoric or engaged with figures in the white nationalist movement.

== See also ==
- American nationalism
- Christian nationalism in the United States
- Discrimination based on skin tone#United States
- Discrimination in the United States
- Anti-Asian racism#United States
- Anti-Black racism#United States
  - Racism against African Americans
    - Black genocide in the United States
- Anti-Mexican sentiment
- Racism against Native Americans in the United States
  - Native American genocide in the United States
- Mass racial violence in the United States
- Nativism (politics)#United States
  - Nativism in United States politics
- Religious discrimination in the United States#Antisemitism
  - Antisemitism by country#United States
    - Antisemitism in the United States
      - History of antisemitism in the United States
- White backlash#United States
- White nationalism#United States
- Xenophobia#United States
  - Xenophobia in the United States
