= Emiliana Cruz =

American anthropologist

Emiliana Cruz (Cieneguilla, San Juan Quiahije, Oaxaca, Mexico, 30 June 1971) is a contemporary linguistic anthropologist. She received her doctorate in linguistic anthropology from University of Texas at Austin and currently teaches at CIESAS-CDMX. She is the co-founder of the Chatino Language Documentation Project.

== Trajectory ==
Cruz was born in Cieneguilla, San Juan Quiahije, Juquila, Oaxaca, Mexico, an indigenous community in Oaxaca, Mexico, and is a native speaker of Eastern Chatino, one of three Chatino languages. She is the daughter of the slain indigenous leader Tomas Cruz Lorenzo The geographic focus of her research is Oaxaca, with a linguistic focus on Chatino. Though her training is predominantly in the areas of grammar, sound, and word structure, with an emphasis on the linguistic features of tonal languages, her work draws together many areas of inquiry. It crosses the disciplinary boundaries of linguistic anthropology, cultural anthropology, indigenous studies, linguistics, education, and geography. Community engagement is an important aspect of her research, informing her purpose to bridge scholarly and community efforts toward documenting and preserving indigenous languages and linguistic practices. She is committed to the inclusion of indigenous communities in her research. In concrete terms, this has meant training speakers of indigenous languages in native language literacy and pedagogy. The first two sections below outline some of the details of this work. The last explains her recent project on language and landscape.

== Tone workshops ==
Cruz has organized a series of tone workshops. In 2012, the first of three summer workshops was held. Each workshop lasted ten days. The three workshops were taught by nine linguists from Mexican and US institutions, including Emiliana Cruz, Anthony C. Woodbury (University of Texas), Francisco Arellanes (Universidad Nacional Autonoma de Mexico), Eric Campbell (University of California, Santa Barbara), Christian DiCanio (State University of New York at Buffalo), Mario Chávez Peón (Centro de Investigaciones y Estudios Superiores en Antropología Social), Alice C. Harris (University of Massachusetts), John Kingston (University of Massachusetts), and Justin D. McIntosh (University of California, San Diego).

At the workshops speakers of Otomanguean languages were provided with the linguistic tools for analyzing the tonal systems of their languages. Each workshop hosted fifty students from major Otomanguean groups, including Zapotecs, Mazatecs, Mixtecs, Triquis, Chinantecs, Me’phaas, Matlatzincas, and Chatinos. In the mornings, lectures covered the phonetics and phonology of tone, methods of tone discovery and analysis, and illustrative Otomanguean tone systems, while afternoons involved tutorials for students according to their level, followed by breakout gatherings for each of the language groups. The Chatino student group included speakers from seven Eastern Chatino varieties. The students were young people; most were literacy trainers in a federal program, the Instituto Nacional para la Educación de los Adultos.

This was the first-ever workshop on tones for speakers of languages of the Otomanguean stock. Many of the students have continued to formally study the tonal systems of their native languages and some are producing pedagogical materials to teach with in local schools.

== Pedagogical material workshop ==
Cruz organized a three-year workshop series for native speakers of Mexican indigenous languages. This series began in the summer of 2015 in Oaxaca City, on the topic of writing pedagogical grammars. This workshop was taught by Professor Luiz Amaral from the Hispanic Linguistics Program at the University of Massachusetts, who specializes in applied linguistics and language pedagogy. The making of pedagogical grammars in any language is a fundamental step toward scholarly research on that language. The workshop series aims to promote dialogue between the fields of linguistics, indigenous studies, and anthropology to produce grammatical and cultural information useful for speaker communities and to support the right of every speaker to understand the linguistic structure of their own language.

== Language, landscape, and expressive culture ==
Through her investigation of the linguistic structure of Chatino, Cruz also been able to study anthropological aspects of Chatino-speaking communities. Her current research emphases are indigenous peoples’ land rights, and the relationship between language and landscape, and connecting both to the documentation and revitalization of endangered languages. Her project analyzes the connection between the linguistic and physical landscape of the municipality of San Juan Quiahije. This project also explores indigenous ways of talking about the land by telling the story of why, how, and to what extent elder speakers of Eastern Chatino transmit specialized vocabulary and related lexicons to their communities, which are encountering homogenizing influences. Further, it investigates language ideologies and practices as a way of engaging more general topics, such as the effects of Mexican state-building, local development initiatives, democracy, migration, and globalization on the ways Chatinos describe the land.

- 2019 Linguistic Diversity in Mexico: The Gaps of “Multicultural” Celebration. The Quarterly Newsletter of the Latin American Studies Association
- 2018 “Narratives of a Hike in San Juan Quiahije.” Anthropological Linguistics, Bloomington: Indiana University, IN 47405-7100.
- 2017 “Names and Naming in Quiahije Chatino.” In Memory and the Politics of Place: Archaeologists, Stakeholders, and the Intangible Heritage of Landscape, Fernando Armstrong-Fumero and Julio Hoil Gutierrez, eds. Boulder: University Press of Colorado.
- 2015 with Anthony C. Woodbury. “Finding a Way into a Family of Tone Languages: the Story of the Chatino Language Documentation Project.” Special Issue: How to Study a Tone Language. S. Bird and L. Hyman, eds. Language Documentation and Conservation Vol. 8: 490-524.
- 2014 with C. Woodbury. “Collaboration in the Context of Teaching, Scholarship, and Language Revitalization: Experience from the Chatino Language Documentation Project.” Special Issue: Language Documentation in the Americas, K. Rice and B. Franchetto, eds. Language Documentation and Conservation Vol. 8: 262-286.
- 2010 with Eric Campbell. “El Sistema Numérico del Proto-chatino” [Numeric System of Proto-Chatino]. Proceedings of the Conference on Indigenous Languages of Latin America-IV. Organized by the Center for Indigenous Languages of Latin America, Teresa Lozano Long Institute of Latin American Studies at the University of Texas at Austin.
- 2008 with Hilaria Cruz and Thomas Smith-Stark “Complementación en el Chatino de San Juan Quiahije” [Complementation in San Juan Quiahije Chatino]. Proceedings of the Conference on Indigenous Languages of Latin America-III. Organized by the Center for Indigenous Languages of Latin America, Teresa Lozano Long Institute of Latin American Studies at the University of Texas at Austin.
