= White ethnostate =

State whose citizenry is limited to White people

A white ethnostate is a proposed type of ethnostate in which residence and citizenship would be limited to white people.

In the United States, proposals for the establishment of such a state are advanced by white supremacist and white nationalist factions such as the Ku Klux Klan, neo-Nazi organization The Base, and others. Proponents have sometimes advocated for violent measures, including terrorism in order to accelerate societal collapse.

Factions claim that either a specific region of a country or the entire country should exclude non-white people and limit rights to white people.

== Proposed white ethnostates ==
=== United States ===
Map of the Northwest Territorial Imperative.

As a matter of historical background, scholars such as Cheryl Harris and Guy-Uriel Charles have noted that the U.S. itself was originally founded as "a homogenous, monoracial community" in which "citizenship itself was linked to white racial identity" per the Naturalization Act of 1790. However, in more recent times, the Pacific Northwest (Washington, Oregon, Idaho, and Montana) has been proposed by many white supremacists as a location for the establishment of a white ethnostate. The Northwest Territorial Imperative was promoted by Richard Girnt Butler, Robert Miles, Robert Jay Mathews, David Lane, and Harold Covington, alongside the white supremacist terrorist organization The Order, the neo-Nazi Christian Identity organization Aryan Nations, the white power skinhead group Volksfront, and the Northwest Front, among others. The Northwest Territorial Imperative also has loose overlap with the Cascadia independence movement, which also seeks to create an independent republic between the Northwest and parts of Northern California in the United States and British Columbia in Canada, though many Cascadian groups specifically reject white nationalist ideologies. Some use the term American Redoubt to describe a similar migration to the Northwestern United States.

The Southern United States has also been proposed as a white ethnostate by the self-proclaimed "Southern Nationalist" League of the South (LS) due to the region's history of secessionism and its de facto independence as the Confederate States of America (1861–1865). The Republic of Florida Militia also has fought for the creation of a white ethnostate in Florida.

The Shield Wall Network (SWN), a neo-Nazi organization founded by Billy Roper and based in Mountain View, Arkansas, has proposed another white ethnostate. The network seeks to establish this ethnostate in the Ozark region and is affiliated with other separatist groups, including the Ku Klux Klan (KKK); the Knights Party, located near Harrison, Arkansas; the League of the South (LS); and the National Socialist Movement (NSM), a member of the now-defunct Nationalist Front. Conversely, the Ozarks have been a "hotbed" for adherents of the Christian Identity movement, including the Church of Israel and various members of the Christian Patriot movement who have established paramilitary training camps to prepare for a coming Armageddon.

=== Africa ===
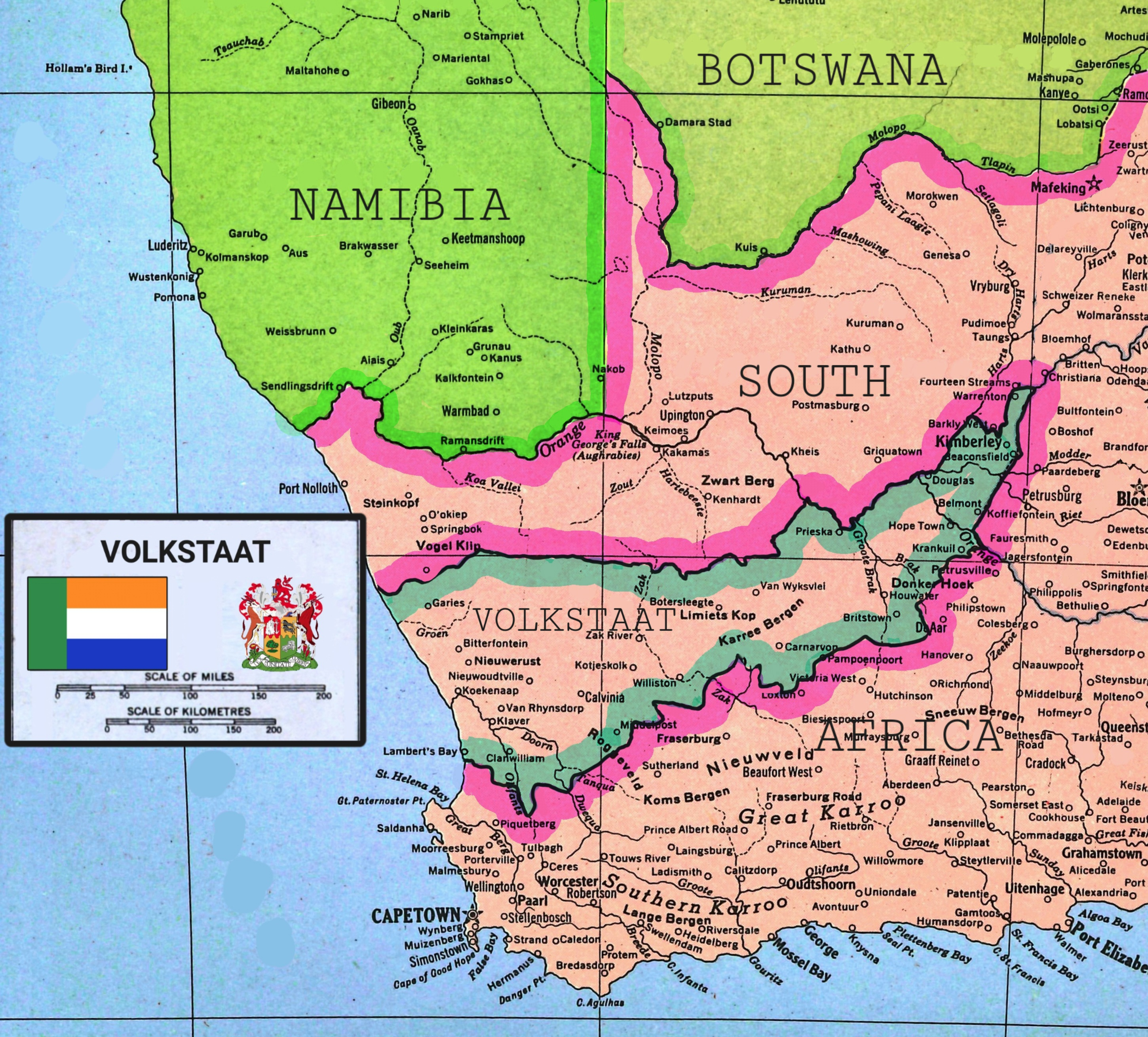
Map of Volkstaat.

The Southern African state of Rhodesia existed from 1965 to 1979 due to the region's white minority attempting to form a separate government in response to a policy from the ruling British government to shift to majority rule before allowing colonial independence. Following the Rhodesian Bush War and both diplomatic and economic pressure, the country granted universal suffrage and became Zimbabwe in 1980.

In South Africa, the term Volkstaat is used to refer to a proposed white ethnnostate within the country.

== See also ==
- Ethnocracy
- Ethnonationalism
- Forsyth County, Georgia (United States)
- Fourteen Words
- Fourth Reich
- Harold Covington
- Identitarianism
- Jamel, Germany, a village known to be heavily populated with neo-Nazis.
- National redoubt
- New Australia
- Nueva Germania
- Orania (South Africa), a "Whites only" town created for the Afrikaner minority group.
- Racial nationalism
- Racial segregation
- Return to the Land (United States)
- Volkstaat
- White flight
- White genocide conspiracy theory
- White nationalism
- White Revolution (neo-Nazi group)
- White supremacy
