= White Revolution (disambiguation) =

White Revolution refers to an Iranian reform movement begun in 1963, and it also may refer to:

- White revolution (India), Operation Flood, a rural development programme in India begun in 1970
- White Revolution (hate group), an American neo-Nazi group
- White Revolution (Korea), the change in agricultural practices towards protected agriculture in South Korea.
