= RIQ =

RIQ may refer to:

- Rassemblement pour l'indépendance du Québec
- Richard Tupper Atwater (1892-1948), American author

== See also ==
- Riq
- Riq Woolen (born 1999), American professional football cornerback
- Rick (disambiguation)
