= Tomás Cruz Lorenzo =

Chatino language activist

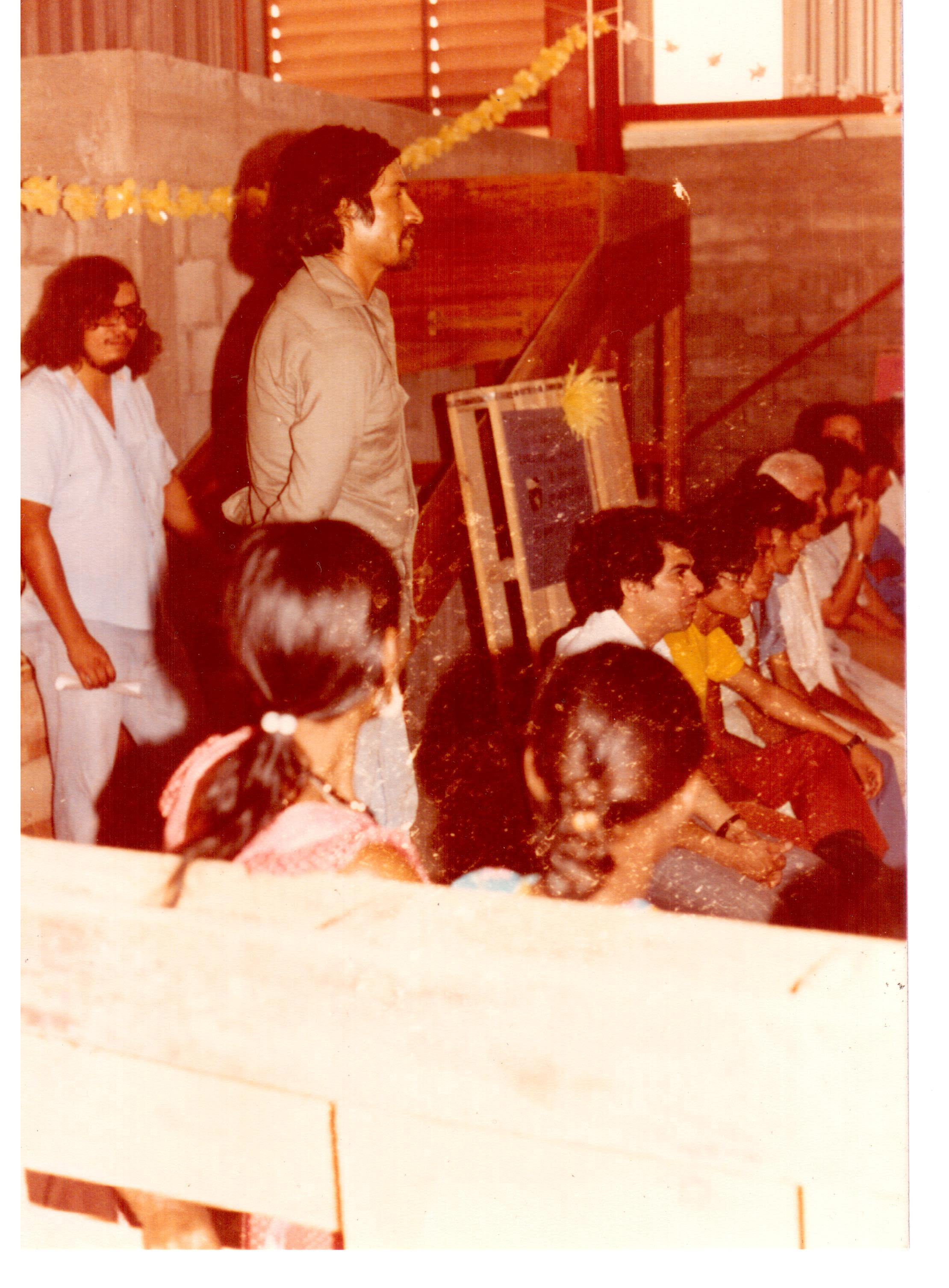
Tomas Cruz Lorenzo

Tomás Cruz Lorenzo (21 December 1950 – 26 September 1989) was a Chatino activist and writer from San Juan Quiahije, Oaxaca, Mexico. He belonged to a generation of communalist, indigenous thinkers in Mexico which included Floriberto Díaz and Jaime Martínez Luna. His writings are influenced by anarchist ideas and call for the defense of the Chatino language and culture and for the autonomy of the Chatino land, which extends from the coast to the highlands of the Sierra in southeast Oaxaca. He was assassinated while waiting for a bus in 1989. The murder remains unsolved.

== Life ==
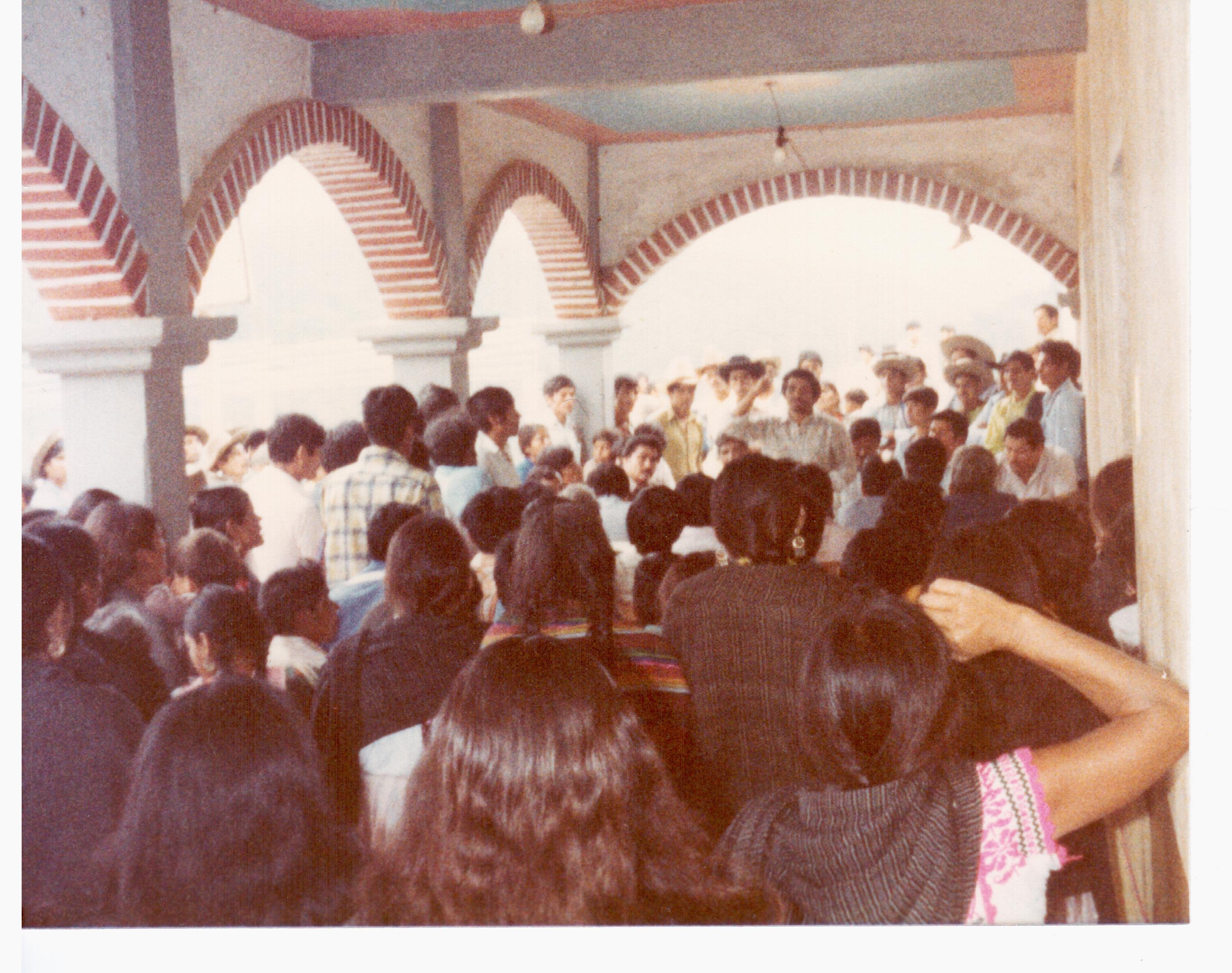
Tomás Cruz in a gathering with his community

Tomás Cruz Lorenzo was born on 21 December 1950 in San Juan Quiahije, Oaxaca, Mexico. He was born to one of the most traditional and marginalized Chatino communities in the state of Oaxaca, Mexico. He completed some schooling, but his professional training began at the age of 20 years old when he was a sacristan to his town's church, during the priesthood of Edmundo Avalos in Panixtlahuaca. He later served as secretary and advisor to the San Juan Quiahije township. In the early 1970s he was one of the founders of Cieneguilla, a town that is now part of the San Juan municipality. In the second half of the 1970s, he was key to many Chatino struggles, including fighting against logging in Yolotepec and the struggle to recover the Santiago Yaitepec lands. He was also president of the Consejo Supremo Chatino (Chatino Supreme Counsel), visiting all the Chatino communities on foot. In 1981 he joined an organization called "Conasupo-Coplamar," where he continued working until a few months before he was murdered. Conasupo-Coplamar's primary goal was community organizing, which they achieved by hiring a large number of community leaders. As a Conasupo supervisor, Tomas had to travel to all different towns and get to know the rest of the Chatino communities, which sharpened his political thinking. Despite his young age, elders were known to seek his advice.

=== Assassination ===
Tomás was 38-years-old when he was gunned down on the night of 26 September 1989, while he was waiting for the bus back to Oaxaca Alberta Cariño. A few days later the crime was reported to the First Forum for Indigenous Human Rights, which took place that year in Matias Romero, Oaxaca Isidro Baldenegro López. 30 years later, his murder remains unsolved. Tomás like many other indigenous leaders Movement for Triqui Autonomy was murdered during the tenure of Salinas de Gortari as president and Heladio Ramírez López as governor.

== Political thought ==
Cruz Lorenzo is considered an anarchist thinker, and his thought was influenced by the teachings of Ricardo Flores Magón, Kropotkin, and Pierre Clastres. He intended to pursue many research projects, but was unable due to his continuous activism and early death. His incomplete projects included studies of the changes in the notion of time among the Chatino people over a span of fifty years and methods for re-establishing traditional modes of social relations, as well as documenting his community's history and the violence and repression against the Chatino region.

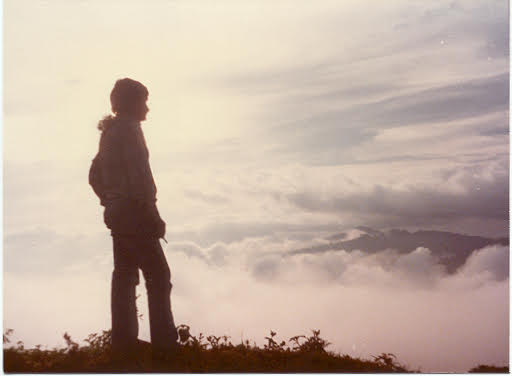

== Written work ==
His quest for learning and understanding influenced him to write about the struggles within his community. He was a co-founder of the publication Nuevo Milenio, which served as a platform for documenting and drawing attention to the issues faced by the Chatino people. Some of his publications include, "De porqué las flores nunca se doblegan con el aguacero" (Why the Flowers Never Break in a Rainstorm), "Problemas forestales en tres comunidades Chatinas en 1977" (Problems related to the Forests in Three Chatino Communities in 1977), "Las sorpresas políticas en Juquila" (Political Surprises in Juquila), and "Reflexiones de un amanecer en mi comunidad" (Reflections on a Dawn in my Community), among others.
