= Christian Exodus Movement =

South Carolina Christian Exodus Movement flag

The Christian Exodus Movement, founded by Cory Burnell in 2003, aimed to relocate conservative Christians to South Carolina to form an independent country based on Christian principles.

== Background ==
It was inspired by movements like the Free State Project. Its goal was to exert local political influence and ultimately establish a theocratic state that could consider secession from the United States.
