= San Juan Quiahije =

San Juan Quiahije Kichinᴬ kiqyaᶜ
- Municipality and town
- Location in Mexico
- Coordinates: 16°18′N 97°19′W
- Country: Mexico
- State: Oaxaca

Area
  - Total: 91.86 km^{2} (35.47 sq mi)

Population (2005)
  - Total: 4,154
- Time zone: UTC-6 (Central Standard Time)

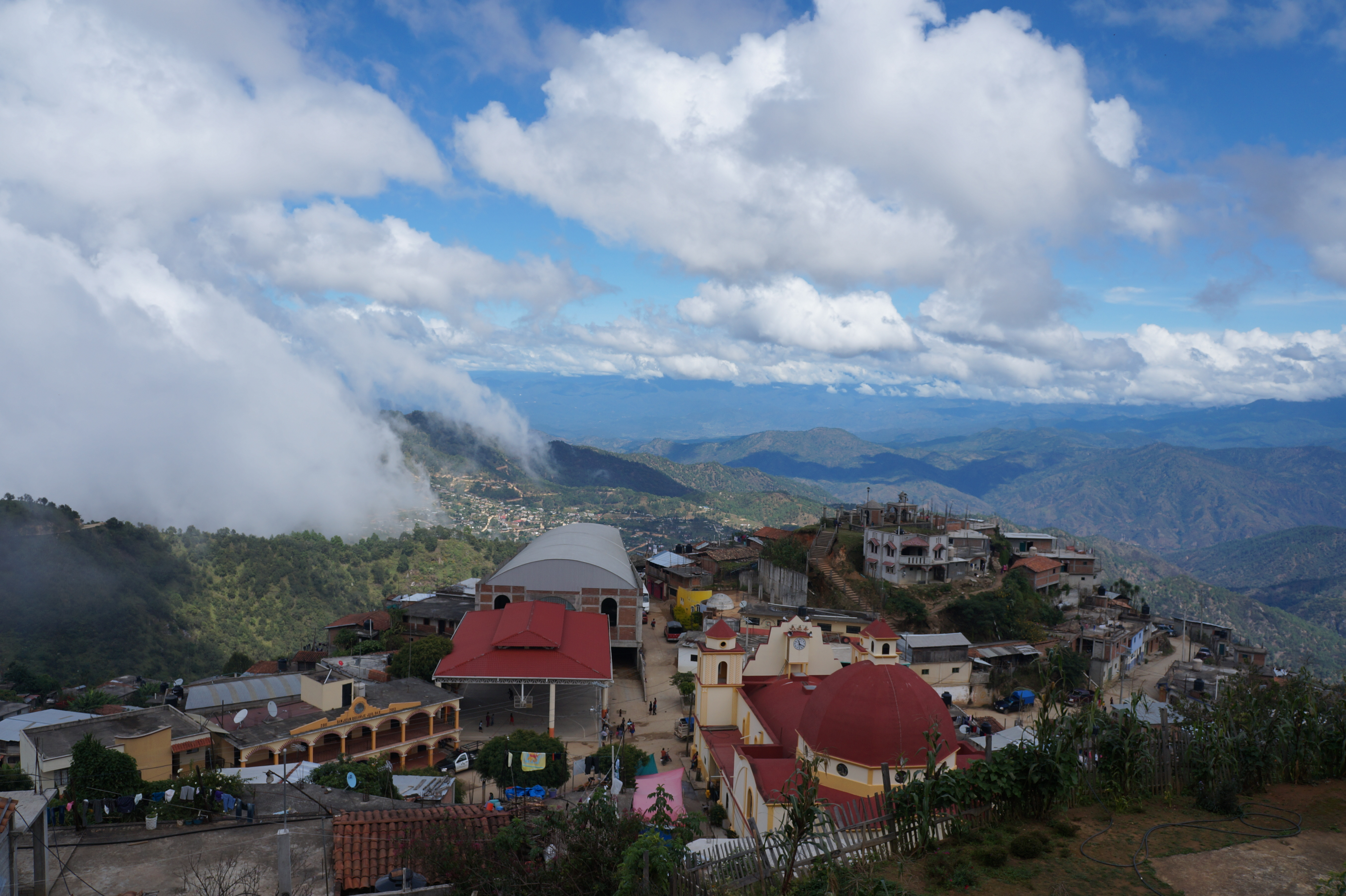

San Juan Quiahije is a town and municipality in Oaxaca in south-western Mexico. It is part of the Juquila District in the centre of the Costa Region. The origin of the name Quiahije is not known, some people conjecture it might mean "Stone Forest" in the Zapotec language. In San Juan Quiahije Chatino, the town is known as Kichinᴬ kiqyaᶜ.

== Geography ==
The municipality covers an area of 91.86 km^{2} at an altitude of 1,960 metres above sea level. The climate is temperate humid with an average temperature of 16.4°C and annual rainfall of 847 mm. The forests contain pines and oaks. Wild fauna include deer, rabbits. iguanas, armadillos, squirrels, badgers, raccoons, wild boars, skunks, wildcats, foxes and coyotes.

== Population ==
As of 2005, the municipality had 593 households with a total population of 4,154, of whom 3,517 people spoke the San Juan Quiahije Chatino language or Chaqᶠ tnyaᴶ. Tomas Cruz Lorenzo was one of the notable leaders in this community. He was killed in Santa Catarina Juquila on September 26, 1989. His assassination is unsolved. Economic activities include farming, animal husbandry and trade. Quiahije is one of the centers of the Chatino people or ntenᴮ chaqᶠ tnyaᴶ, related to the Zapotec but with a distinct language.
