= White Revolution (Korea) =

The South Korean White Revolution is a term used to refer to the extensive use of plastic films (specifically, polyethylene film) for greenhouses, mulching and Polytunnels. This practice turned the color of the landscape from green to white, due to the large area of agricultural land under protected cultivation.

== South Korea's "Green Revolution" ==
The term is analogous to the term Green Revolution, which refers to increases in food production through improving the breeding system and agricultural infrastructure in developing countries. The term "White Revolution", however, is solely used in South Korea. The term comes from the modernization of the structure, material and technology of greenhouses needed achieve the rapid expansion of protected cultivated areas and produce a stable supply of vegetables, from the 1970s to the 1990s in Korea.'

== History ==
Protected cultivation using greenhouses expanded rapidly over a short period. The Income Increase Program for Farmers and Fishers (IIPFF) was initiated by the Agricultural Ministry of Korea, which resulted in the rapid expansion of plastic film greenhouses in the late 1970s.

Protected cultivation was enabled by the development of the oil and steel industries. South Korea is not an oil producing country. As a result, all plastic films were imported until the 1960s. Greenhouse vegetable production in winter became popular in 1970 only after the petrochemical industry began to produce and distribute low cost plastic films. The production of steel coil from POSCO, established in 1973, made it possible to use steel instead of bamboo for greenhouses, which increased structural durability.

Improvements in technology and distribution were important in expanding protected cultivation. Scientists and researchers from the National Institute for Horticultural and Herbal Sciences (NIHHS) and universities across South Korea collaborated to improve and standardize greenhouse structure. Domestic seed companies developed new cultivars of major crops and distributed them to farmers. Cultivars of strawberries, tomatoes and melons were developed by the NIHHS.

Other technologies were needed for covering materials, heating, optimum fertilization rate, irrigation, fertigation, reducing successive cropping hazard, supplying CO_{2}, raising seedlings, and controlling combined environmental factors. The Vegetable Research Division in Suwon and the Protected Horticultural Research Station in Busan played pivotal roles in developing and distributing technologies required by farmers.
