= White Revolution (neo-Nazi group) =

American neo-Nazi group

White Revolution was a neo-Nazi group that was active in Arkansas from 2002 to 2011. It was headquartered out of Russellville, Arkansas. The group was founded by Billy Joe Roper Jr., a neo-Nazi activist who identifies himself as a "Balkanizer" and a "Purity Spiraler". He founded White Revolution in 2002 as an antisemitic group promoting white interests. He was a former member of the National Alliance.

The party was shut down by Roper in 2011, when he elected to join with Thom Robb's group. Roper now leads the ShieldWall Network, a white nationalist organization with the goal of building a white ethno-state.
