= The Andrew Show =

American talk show

- The first episode of the show
- Genre: Talk show
- Created by: Rachel Pendegraft
- Starring: Andrew Pendergraft

Original release
- Network: Public-access television
- Release: 2009 – 2011

The Andrew Show is a defunct American talk show targeted towards children that was hosted by a young Andrew Pendergraft. The show was produced from 2009 to 2011 and features Pendergraft, grandson of Ku Klux Klan National Director Thom Robb and the son of Rachel Pendegraft, discussing far-right politics and white supremacy. The show initially aired on public-access television before being posted online.

== Background ==
In 1989, Thom Robb became the leader of the Ku Klux Klan. In the 1990s, with the help of his daughter Rachel Pendegraft, Robb attempted to rebrand the Klan and update its image, claiming that it represented "heritage, not hate", and present its views as more publicly acceptable. Rachel Pendergraft's two daughters Charity and Shelbey and her son Andrew were homeschooled at the family's ranch in Arkansas, and Charity and Shelbey were in a white supremacist band called Heritage Connection.

Under the leadership of Thom Robb, the Ku Klux Klan has sought to expand its media presence and create propaganda to spread its views via public-access television and the Internet. Public-access television shows created by the Klan include This is the Klan, a news television show starring Robb and his daughter Rachel Pendegraft, White Woman's Perspective starring Rachel Pendegraft, Youth Focus: News for White Teens starring Pendegraft's teenage daughter, and The Andrew Show starring her son Andrew. The Klan later posted these television shows online. Andrew's participation in the show was guided by his mother.

== Content ==
The seventh episode of the show

The Andrew Show follows Andrew Pendergraft sitting in front of a green screen talking about white supremacist ideology. He is sometimes joined by his sister's dog, a pug named Pugzy. The show is targeted towards children. In the show, Pendergraft is seen reading from a script and often does not look at the camera.

He frequently invokes references to the mainstream popular culture of the time to create analogies. In one episode he states that dogs sharing a dog park in the film Marmaduke is "like [when] different races come and say that white people shouldn't have their own land". He also denounces The Spy Next Door and The Naked Brothers Band for containing depictions of interracial relationships. He also discusses then-current political events, such as when he said that the 2011 Tucson shooting would not have happened if there were more good guys with guns. He also condemns The Princess and the Frog for its depiction of Vodou, saying that it is "a religion that lots of blacks used to have, but white people taught them about God".

The show has other collaborators besides Pendergraft. In one episode, a friend of his named Alex appears and discusses how he thinks "it would be really sad if there were no more white kids left in 100 years". The show also occasionally shows him going on excursions outside of the studio, such as when he visits a white-only church in Indiana.

== Reception ==
The show has been criticized for its use of a child to promote white supremacist ideology. The website Jezebel called the show "disturbing", especially considering that Pendergraft was likely of middle school age. The magazine PopMatters also said that "while many adult groups use children to spread their message, it's yet upsetting to watch a child who still has trouble pronouncing his R's express his disgust over interracial couples in the cartoons he watches."

The show has also faced criticism for its poor production quality, which includes a very low image resolution, bearing strong resemblance to 1980s media in spite of having been recorded in the late 2000s. Vice described the green screen backgrounds as covered in "grainy, naff techno-chintz", while Jezebel said that the poor production quality "is proof that the Klan's views on race are just as vintage as their video backgrounds."

== See also ==
- Prussian Blue (duo)
