= Rassemblement pour l'indépendance du Québec =

The Rassemblement pour l'indépendance du Québec, or RIQ, is an association of citizens in favour of Quebec independence.

Founded in May 2000, it is purposely unaffiliated officially with any political party (like the Parti Québécois, the main Quebec independence party) or any political ideology outside sovereignty matters (despite the important links between the Quebec independence movement and the Quebec left). It did however support the Parti Québécois in the 2003 Quebec general election. It also puts independence before any association projects with Canada (see also: Pur et dur).

== See also ==
- Quebec sovereignty movement
- Pur et dur
- Quebec nationalism
- Quebec politics
- List of active autonomist and secessionist movements
