= Movement for Triqui Autonomy =

Independence movement in Mexico

The Movement for Triqui Autonomy is the struggle for independence of the Triqui people, who live in the Mexican state of Oaxaca. Once based in town of San Juan Copala, they are now largely a diaspora due to the ongoing conflict in the region. In 1975, an Indigenous movement known as the club was formed with the goals of "agrarian conflict resolution, the defense of human rights, and the formation of cooperatives that would market regional products." Not long after it was created, the club's leaders were killed and in 1978 the government introduced a military presence in San Juan Copala. The conflict culminated in 2006 with the clash between the state of Oaxaca, led by the Institutional Revolutionary Party (PRI), and the indigenous autonomy movement, led by the Popular Assembly of the People of Oaxaca (APPO). APPO was formed in June 2006 during the teacher strikes as an alliance to oppose Oaxacan Governor Ulises Ruiz Ortiz. The attacks have since been stepped up in order to quash the autonomy movement and return control over the land to the government.

== Historical background ==
Oaxaca, located in the Southwest of the country, has a population of more than 3.2 million and is home to "16 different ethnic indigenous groups." Triqui is an overarching linguistic group that includes three subgroups: Copala Triqui, Chicahuaxtla Triqui, and San Martín Triqui. The different subgroups are determined by where they live in the mountains: Copala Triqui is found in the lower region of Copala, San Martín Triqui is found in the middle area of San Martín Itunyoso, and Chicahuaxtla is found in the higher region of San Andrés de Chicahuaxtla. There are over 20,000 speakers of Triqui in this region: "15,000…in Copala; 6,000 in San Andrés Chicahuaxtla; 2,000 in San Martín Itunyoso."

Historically, San Juan Copala was considered a free municipality by the state of Oaxaca until Oaxaca removed its autonomy and classified it as "a municipal agency of Juxtlahuaca" in 1948. Since 1948, the Institutional Revolution Party (PRI) has run the government in Oaxaca. In 1975, an Indigenous movement known as the club was formed with the goals of "agrarian conflict resolution, the defense of human rights, and the formation of cooperatives that would market regional products." The club was in conflict with the PRI over different ideological goals. Not long after it was created, the club's leaders were killed and in 1978 the government introduced "a military presence in San Juan Copala" that lasted until 1991. In 1991, the military was replaced by the Oaxaca state police. Under the military presence, indigenous movements and organizations such as the Club and the Movement of Triqui Unification and Struggle (MULT) faced pressure. MULT was formed in the 1970s to fight for Triqui autonomy and "fight against the caciques (local political bosses)." MULT worked with Indigenous communities in the area of San Juan Copala to introduce opposition candidates to challenge the PRI candidates in local elections.

The state of Oaxaca, run by the PRI, responded to these electoral challenges by using the judicial system against MULT supporters and forming organizations to combat opposition. In 1994, the PRI formed a paramilitary group called the Union for the Social Well-being of the Triqui Region (UBISORT) to maintain its control over the region. In 2003, the political party affiliated with MULT won an election, leading the PRI to focus on "infiltrating and corrupting the MULT." In 2006, a faction of MULT split off and formed its own group to fight for Triqui autonomy: the Unified Independent Movement for the Triqui Liberation Independiente (MULTI). The PRI has been acting to oppress MULTI and its supporters because of their fight for autonomy for Triqui land and people.

== 2006 protests in Oaxaca ==
The conflict culminated in 2006 with the clash between the state of Oaxaca, led by the PRI, and the indigenous autonomy movement, led by the Popular Assembly of the People of Oaxaca (APPO). APPO was formed in June 2006 during the teacher strikes as an alliance to oppose Oaxacan Governor Ruiz. It is made up of over 360 "social, political, human rights, non-governmental, environmental, gender, student, and union organizations, the indigenous communities, and thousands of independent Oaxacans." The clash started with a teachers strike in May, with demands for raises and increased budgets for schools in poorer rural areas of the state of Oaxaca, which the Governor refused to consider. The strike led to a sit-in in the main square of the city of Oaxaca where the teachers were joined by thousands of supporters. In June, the state police raided the camp with "helicopters, tear gas, and rifles" but the teachers fought back by throwing "gas canisters… and charging [the police] with commandeered buses," reclaiming the square. The demands of the strike shifted from higher education budgets to the removal of the Governor. APPO became the focal point of the movement and took over the center of Oaxaca City, leading a march of hundreds of thousands of people two days after the June police raid on the sit-in. By July and August, terror tactics were being used against the APPO-led movement with unidentified gunmen shooting at APPO marches and radio stations. In September, APPO declared itself to be the "only legitimate government in the state" and announced it was forming a government according to the policy of usos y costumbres. The clashes between the APPO and the PRI escalated. APPO protestors were attacked by PRI members with clubs, as well as kidnapped and shot at by unidentified gunmen. In October, an attack on an APPO barricade resulted in the deaths of two APPO members and a camera operator from New York. Two days later, thousands of Federal Police entered the city of Oaxaca to retake the city square from APPO "with water cannons, tear gas, helicopters, and armored vehicles." On October 30, the day after the federal troops entered the city, the official National Human Rights Commission of Mexico reported two confirmed deaths and "at least 40 arrests" since the troops had arrived, a number denied by President Fox who "described the operation as ‘bloodless.’" On November 7, "a women’s march demanding the withdrawal of federal police was attacked by armored vehicles with water cannons. Claims of "sexual abuses by the federal troops" led to a protest by women in Oaxaca City on November 9, which the police responded to with "tear gas and water cannons."

== Declaration of autonomy ==
In 1995, Mexico introduced a law recognizing usos y costumbres (customs and practices), or traditional determinations of leaders for indigenous groups. Under the policy, political parties are not recognized and leaders are selected by consensus. On January 21, 2007, after electing leaders, the "Triqui indigenous community of Oaxaca declared its autonomy." The elected president, José Ramírez Flores, and other Triqui leaders received death threats and one day before the new municipal leaders were supposed to take office, "paramilitary groups burst into town and shot up the place."

Prior to the election of these new leaders, APPO held a "constitutive congress" in November 2006 with "3,000 delegates from across the state" of Oaxaca and introduced the State Council of the Popular Assembly of the Peoples of Oaxaca. The creation of an autonomous Triqui region was significant because it reunified indigenous lands that had been divided up when the region's "free municipality" status had been rescinded by the government in 1948. Inspired by the indigenous movement in Chiapas, Triqui and Mixtec leaders announced the formation of an "autonomous municipality" in January 2007. The leaders who created this autonomous region were also supporters of MULTI. In spite of their declaration, MULT and the PRI continued to fight over control of Triqui territory; when the director of UBISORT was shot, he accused the director of MULT of planning the attack.

In response to the Triqui declaration of autonomy in the municipality of San Juan Copala, UBISORT surrounded San Juan Copala. Residents who supported the declaration of autonomy were intimidated by the UBISORT and MULT who had taken control of the town and prevented anyone from entering or exiting. In January 2008, a radio station was formed to be "the voice that breaks the silence" for the newly declared autonomous municipality. Three months later, "two of its young presenters, Felicitas Martínez and Teresa Bautista, were killed in an armed ambush."

The PRI increased its presence in San Juan Copala in November 2009 with the goal of "the elimination of the autonomy project and the recuperation of alliances with the government in order to facilitate development projects in the region." Water, food, and electricity were cut off by the paramilitaries and gunmen were stationed "in the hills surrounding the town and shot at anyone they saw on the streets." On April 27, 2010 an aid caravan was sent to San Juan Copala but was attacked by UBISORT, resulting in the deaths of "two human rights activists." One of the activists, Bety Cariño, was a leader in "indigenous-led human rights struggles in Southern México." Cariño had received death threats before she was shot by UBISORT. Although UBISORT is affiliated with the PRI, the ruling party in Oaxaca, the government has attributed the violence to "internal conflicts in the Triqui region." In September 2010, gunmen captured the town hall, using guns to control San Juan Copala. The leaders of the autonomous municipality "ordered the total evacuation" of San Juan Copala after paramilitaries "said that they would massacre all supporters of the autonomous municipality." Within the first week of the paramilitary groups controlling town hall, the "autonomous municipality… reported at least five females injured – including a little girl – and one man killed, all by gunfire." After that week, the autonomous municipality says only two families remained in the town, compared to the fifty that were reported to be there when the town hall was seized. The two houses where the remaining families were living were said to be "completely surrounded by gunmen. The violence in San Juan Copala is significant. According to one source, there have been about 600 homicides over the last three decades, a large number for a town of about 700 people. During the more than nine-month reign of the paramilitary groups, 35 people were killed, "dozens of women were seriously injured or raped," and nearly 600 people were forced out of the town of San Juan Copala for supporting its autonomy.

=== Fight for Triqui land ===
Triqui families have been living and protesting in Oaxaca City's main square since August 2010 On September 10, Triqui women "declared a hunger strike… to pressure the government to send police into San Juan Copala to evacuate the two families who remain trapped inside." Since its creation in 2010, the protest camp has been forced to move many times. In December 2012, the Oaxaca state government forcibly removed the Triqui protest camp from its location in Oaxaca City's main square in preparation for the annual tourist festival Noche de Rábanos.

The protesters have unsuccessfully tried to return to the town of San Juan Copala. In 2012, a peace agreement was signed but it only resulted in a decrease in violence, not an end.

In September 2013, the Oaxaca state government agreed to relocate the displaced residents of San Juan Copala within 90 days. More than two years later, the displaced Triqui have still not been relocated. On November 4, 2015 Triqui community members began protesting in the "corridor of the government palace in the Oaxacan capital demanding" the government follow through on its agreement. The government response to their demands was to send riot police to remove the Triqui demonstrators.
