= Thom Robb =

American white supremacist (born 1946)

Thomas Robb

National Director of the Knights of the Ku Klux Klan
- Incumbent
- Assumed office 1989
- Preceded by: Stanley McCollum (as Imperial Wizard)

Personal details
- Born: October 13, 1946 (age 80) Detroit, Michigan, U.S.
- Children: 1
- Known for: Leader of the Knights of the Ku Klux Klan

Thomas Arthur Robb (born October 13, 1946) is an American white supremacist and Christian Identity pastor. He is the current Grand wizard of the Knights of the Ku Klux Klan, also known as the Knights Party, taking control of the organization since 1989.

== Early life ==
Thomas Arthur Robb was born in Detroit, Michigan, and grew up in Tucson, Arizona. He attended college in Colorado.

== Christian Identity and Klan activities ==
In 1989, Robb took over the Knights of the Ku Klux Klan, originally led by David Duke. In a bid to gain mainstream acceptance, he took the title of "National Director" instead of the title of "Imperial Wizard", and he chose to rename the organization "The Knights Party". He also decided to accept members via mail-in forms, rather than through initiation rites that had been common Klan practice in the past. Robb defends the Klan as a harmless organization, claiming that it is "gentle, upbeat, and friendly"; when he was featured in the PBS documentary Banished, Robb compared a Klan hood to a businessman's tie, claiming that "it's just tradition".

In the 1990s, with the help of his daughter Rachel Pendegraft, Robb attempted to rebrand the Klan and update its image, claiming that it represented "heritage, not hate" and present its views as more publicly acceptable. He and his daughter later produced public-access television shows to promote white supremacist views, including The Andrew Show, which was hosted by Robb's young grandson.

Robb has maintained his ties with other far-right groups; he has spoken at the Aryan Nations's annual "World Congress" of hate group leaders, he has appeared on Jamie Kelso's white supremacist Voice of Reason Radio Network, and he has regularly contributed to the white supremacist Internet forum website Stormfront. Robb's "Thomas Robb Ministries" website declares that "the Anglo Saxon, Germanic, Scandinavian, and kindred people are the divinely chosen people of the Bible."

In 1999, Robb was interviewed by British journalist Jon Ronson, and he was also featured in a documentary that Ronson produced. In 2009, Robb's daughter Rachel Pendergraft and his granddaughters, Charity and Shelby Pendergraft, formed a white nationalist band which they called Heritage Connection. Robb's Party publishes The Crusader, a quarterly publication. In November 2016, just days before the presidential election, Robb wrote a front-page article under the title "Make America Great Again" in The Crusader, devoted to a lengthy endorsement of Donald Trump and Trump's message. The Trump campaign responded by denouncing the Crusader article.

In May 2022, British YouTuber Niko Omilana published a video titled "I Pranked America's Most Racist Man" in which he described his experiences in Zinc and Harrison while he disguised himself as a journalist for the BBC. The video includes an interview with Robb, and during the interview, Robb unwittingly shouts out fake Instagram users whose names phoneticize phrases such as "BLM" (Black Lives Matter).

In September 2026, Robb was interviewed by Australian Nine Network during which he praised One Nation and Pauline Hanson. One Nation responded by rejecting Robb's endorsement.
