= Welcome to Leith =

2015 documentary film

- Theatrical release poster
- Directed by: Michael Beach Nichols; Christopher K. Walker
- Written by: Michael Beach Nichols; Christopher K. Walker
- Produced by: Joey Carey; Jenner Furst; Michael Beach Nichols; Christopher K. Walker; Joshua Woltermann
- Cinematography: Michael Beach Nichols
- Edited by: Michael Beach Nichols; Christopher K. Walker; Joshua Woltermann
- Music by: T. Griffin
- Production companies: No Weather; Sundial Pictures
- Distributed by: First Run Features
- Release dates: January 25, 2015 (Sundance); March 13, 2015 (SXSW); September 9, 2015
- Running time: 86 minutes
- Country: United States
- Language: English
- Box office: $36,010

Welcome to Leith is a 2015 American documentary film directed by Michael Beach Nichols and Christopher K. Walker about white supremacist Craig Cobb's attempt to take over the North Dakota city Leith. The film premiered on January 26, 2015 at the 2015 Sundance Film Festival and, after a limited theatrical release on September 9, was broadcast on PBS' series Independent Lens on April 4, 2016.

== Background ==
Leith is a town which had a population of 16 in 2010. In May 2012, Craig Cobb, an American Canadian neo-Nazi, moved to Leith with the intention of building a community of people sharing the ideology of neo-Nazism and gaining the electoral majority. He purchased 12 plots of land.

== Production ==
Nichols and Walker, who are based in New York, flew to North Dakota two months after they read an August 2013 New York Times article about Craig Cobb's scheme to transform Leith into a white-supremacist town. They made three trips to Leith within an 8-month period, each around 4 weeks long, for the production of the film. 5 months were spent editing the film. In June 2014 Nichols and Walker launched a Kickstarter campaign to raise funds for the production of the film. They surpassed their $60,000 goal, raising $64,751. The directors approached the project in many ways as a documentary version of a horror/western—the residents of Leith were scared and confused and felt as if one wrong move could end in violence. They aimed to capture the sense of fear and isolation that residents living in a town of 24 people 70 miles from anything experienced when Cobb made his takeover intentions public.

== Reception ==
On July 25, 2017, Welcome to Leith was nominated for an Emmy for Best Documentary by the News & Doc Emmy Awards. The film received largely positive reviews from critics. On Rotten Tomatoes, it holds a 98% score based on 43 reviews, with an average rating of 7.7/10. The site's consensus states: "As disturbing as it is thought-provoking, Welcome to Leith offers an uncomfortable — and essential — glimpse into a part of society many Americans would much rather ignore." Metacritic reports a 78 out of 100 rating based on 16 critics.

Indiewire critic Eric Kohn gave the documentary an A− grade, described it as "a stunning portrait of First Amendment rights pushed to their extremes".

== See also ==
- White ethnostate
- Jamel, Germany, a village known to be heavily populated with neo-Nazis.
- Return to the Land (United States)
