= Craig Cobb =

American white supremacist

- Born: Paul Craig Cobb; October 9, 1951 (age 74); Maryville, Missouri, U.S.
- Citizenship: American, Canadian
- Occupations: Owner of defunct Podblanc, activist

Paul Craig Cobb (born 1951) is an American Canadian white supremacist and member of the Creativity movement. He is also the founder of the now-defunct video sharing website Podblanc.

Cobb is known for his failed attempt to take over the city of Leith, North Dakota and turn it into a neo-Nazi stronghold. The community had only sixteen residents as of the 2010 census, which was the latest at the time. Cobb purchased at least twelve plots of land in Leith, North Dakota, with the goal of moving in other white supremacists and taking over the city government, despite heavy opposition from locals. Welcome to Leith is a 2015 documentary film about Cobb's attempt to take over the town.

In October 2013, Cobb was featured as a guest on The Trisha Goddard Show, where he met with the lone black resident of Leith and his white wife. The couple said that their lives were being disrupted and that their experience in Leith since Cobb moved in was being ridden with "turmoil and deception". The episode featured Shahrazad Ali, who agreed with Cobb on the concept of racial separation. In a November 2013 interview, Goddard revealed the results of a DNA test, to which Cobb had agreed, indicating that he was genetically 14 percent Sub-Saharan African. Cobb dismissed the results as statistical noise. However, Cobb retested himself with Ancestry DNA, which allegedly showed that he has 100% European ancestry.

== Youth and early adulthood ==
Cobb was born in Maryville, Missouri, US on October 9, 1951 and raised in Boston, Massachusetts, US. He says he was raised as a Christian, but has since denounced Christianity, saying "I don't understand Christians. They have a need to be morally superior than the next guy. ... They are very threatened by anything with racial cohesion."

After serving in the military, he lived in Edmonton, Alberta, Canada, for five years before moving to Hawaii, where he lived for another 25 years and earned a living as a taxi driver.

In 2003, he relocated to Frost, West Virginia, where he opened a grocery store and registered a business called "Gray's Store, Aryan Autographs and 14 Words, L.L.C." During this time, he was involved in unsolicited inter-state deliveries of a neo-Nazi newspaper published by Alex Linder, and distribution of Project Schoolyard CDs to local children.

== Moving abroad ==
In late 2005, after receiving an inheritance of $85,000, he moved to Tallinn, Estonia. In Tallinn, Cobb met with white power skinheads, and purchased land 30 miles (48 kilometers) south of Tallinn where he hoped to establish an "International Office of White Diaspora". During this period, Cobb established Podblanc, a white supremacist video sharing website. His attempts to find an Estonian woman who would marry him were unsuccessful and he came to public attention after conducting an interview with a former Estonian Ministry of Justice employee whom he introduced as the leader of the Estonian Neo-Nazis. On August 25, 2009, he was issued a ten-year ban from Estonia and deported to Canada, where Cobb claims to hold citizenship, for "endangering state security, public order, public safety, moral standards, health, other public interests" and promoting racism.

During his period of incarceration before deportation, his supporters in the US made contact with Canadian neo-fascist Paul Fromm in order to prepare for Cobb's anticipated arrest under Canadian hate speech laws. In March 2010, after posting videos of anti-racist activists online, he was discovered to be living in the Downtown Eastside area of Vancouver, British Columbia, where he also made an unsuccessful attempt to register a non-profit society called Whitepeace.

== Returning to the US ==
In June 2010, Cobb was arrested by police in Vancouver, but released with a summons after which he left Canada to return to the United States. In 2010, Cobb was living in Kalispell, Montana, which was a recruiting target for several white nationalists. Cobb engaged in a feud with another local neo-Nazi, Karl Gharst, against whom he had filed a restraining order in October 2010. His activities were opposed by the local pro-tolerance group Love Lives Here.

At the end of December 2010, Canadian authorities issued a warrant for his arrest on the charge of "willful promotion of hatred" after a failure to appear". Cobb responded to the warrant by stating "You can find me in the orange easy chair near the elevator..." at the Flathead County Library in Kalispell.

== Leith, North Dakota ==
Cobb relocated to western North Dakota for its supply of high-paying jobs at oil fields and its high proportion of white residents. He claimed that he was fired from a job over disagreements with a co-worker, and that he lost a job with a Fargo paving company after there was media coverage of his settlement plans. While Cobb was working in Watford City, North Dakota, he found on Craigslist that there were lots available for sale in Leith, North Dakota. As of December 2013, Cobb lived in Leith, where he tried to create a white supremacist community. By August 2013, he had purchased 13 plots of land in the town. Several other prominent white supremacists, including April Gaede and her husband, also own land in Leith. He has transferred ownership of two plots to fellow white supremacists Alex Linder and Tom Metzger. Another white supremacist, Jeff Schoep, visited Leith in late September 2013 in order to support Cobb, and he brought several fellow members of the National Socialist Movement with him.

Several former members of Anti-Racist Action formed a peaceful, grassroots movement called UnityND and began organizing a demonstration of their own in Leith, that would protest against both Cobb and Schoep. Several hundred people attended the protests against Cobb and his allies, including hundreds of members of the Standing Rock Indian Reservation. As a reaction to Cobb's planned takeover of Leith, some have even advocated disbanding Leith and dissolving it into Grant County proper. Cobb stated that he will pursue to file a restraining order against the Standing Rock Indian Reservation.

=== Legal issues ===
In September 2013, Custer Health Environmental Services in Mandan, North Dakota, which provides safety and sanitation inspections for five counties, including Grant County, had issued 12 citations that month to 10 individuals, including Cobb. Citing Cobb's failure to install a running water and sewage system in his properties within the 30-day deadline, the health unit announced that it would seek a court order to condemn his properties, unless he cooperated and released a plan detailing future water and sewage installation. Afterwards, Cobb announced that he had no intention of cooperating with the health unit and planned to fight the eviction notice.

==== Arrest and release on probation ====
In November 2013, Cobb and Kynan Dutton were arrested by two Grant county deputies and held in the Mercer County jail. Dutton was already out on bond for a previous drunk and disorderly conduct charge. Cobb was upset, claiming his property was vandalized by the town's residents; two videos from their subsequent 'patrol' were posted on YouTube. They were booked on suspicion of terrorizing. Ultimately, the two were charged with six counts of "terrorizing". However, the district attorney dropped the second of seven original counts after one man, acting as a reporter in some capacity, later claimed that he "did not feel threatened". According to the Leith website developer, Cobb and the other man arrested held the guns high and then lowered them, but did not speak and did not point the guns directly at the men. The two men subsequently appeared in court for a bond hearing, and the court decided that both should be held without bail. He refused food while in prison, but said that his refusal was not a hunger strike; rather, he was practising mahasamādhi and that he believed he would leave his physical body for another "plane of existence" at Yuletide. He also said he considers himself a martyr. As a result of his hunger strike, Cobb was sent to a psychiatric hospital for evaluation. Together with his follower Kynan Dutton, the two men were scheduled for a preliminary hearing on seven felony accounts of terrorism to be held on January 13, 2014. His bail was set at $1 million.

In February 2014, he sold his house in Leith and one other plot of land to a man from neighboring Carson, and in March he deeded his remaining lots back to Leith. Of the lots he originally purchased, three remained owned by Alex Linder, Tom Metzger, and Jeff Schoep. The lot owned by Linder was seized for nonpayment of property taxes, and Jeff Schoep later renounced his racist viewpoints.

After a plea agreement, Cobb was released on April 29, 2014, on four years' probation and time served. He was fitted with an ankle monitor and banned from returning to Leith. Cobb expressed interest in purchasing lots in Regan, North Dakota, and Crosby, North Dakota, and said he would leave Leith if his charges would be dropped.

Leith's Mayor Ryan Schock and Councilman Lee Cook, who was one of Cobb's victims, had expressed concerns for the town's safety because Cobb some of the property was still owned by white supremacists. Cobb himself had earlier announced his "retirement from white nationalism" and has said that he will seek permission to transfer his probation to Missouri where he will look after his mother.

== Subsequent activities ==
In 2015, Cobb attempted to purchase $69,000 worth of property in Antler, North Dakota, in an attempt to take over the town and rename it after Donald Trump, whom Cobb says he admires.

In 2015, Cobb purchased three foreclosed properties, two in Red Cloud, Nebraska and one in Inavale, Nebraska. He stated that these purchases were part of another plan to establish an all-white community. A local court blocked the sale after nearby town residents were able to pay the back taxes for the properties.

In 2017, Cobb purchased a church in Nome, North Dakota. He wanted to transform it into a chapel for the Creativity movement, and wished to name it after Donald Trump. The church was destroyed in an arson attack the same day that a local newspaper ran a story covering Cobb's plans.

== Online activities ==
Cobb posts under his own name on the Stormfront website and under the pseudonym "Chain" on Podblanc, which references the abolition of the National Origins Formula in the Immigration and Nationality Act of 1965. While his internet activities center upon "tireless propaganda" for Podblanc he is also active in discussion boards.

After the arrest of Matt Hale in 2003 for soliciting the murder of U.S. District Judge Joan Lefkow, Cobb posted the judge's home address, family photographs and a map to her house. Lefkow's husband and mother were subsequently murdered, albeit by somebody not affiliated with Cobb or white supremacy. In reply to a reporter's question "What were you feeling when the double murder happened?" Cobb stated "What was I feeling? Emotions are not yet illegal. I was just fine with it. I think it was well done."

=== Video recordings and disruptions ===
Cobb's video recordings fall into two types of productions. The first consists of unedited presentations of antisemitic canards commentary and discussion featuring close-up shots of himself, often presented as part of his "Deprogram" series on YouTube and Podblanc. The second consists of street interviews gathered at events where Cobb presents himself as a journalist for Vanguard News Network, asks a series of provocative questions laced with racial slurs, typically sparking outrage from targeted individuals.

Documented incidents include a rally in Kingston, New York in 2005 and a 50 Cent concert in Tallinn in 2008. One such disruption occurred in October 2005 at the U.S. Capitol Rotunda as civil rights leader Rosa Parks was lying in state. Cobb confronted visitors, referred to Parks as a "shitskin communist", and stated that he was there to celebrate her death.
