= Jamel rockt den Förster =

Open-air music festival in Germany

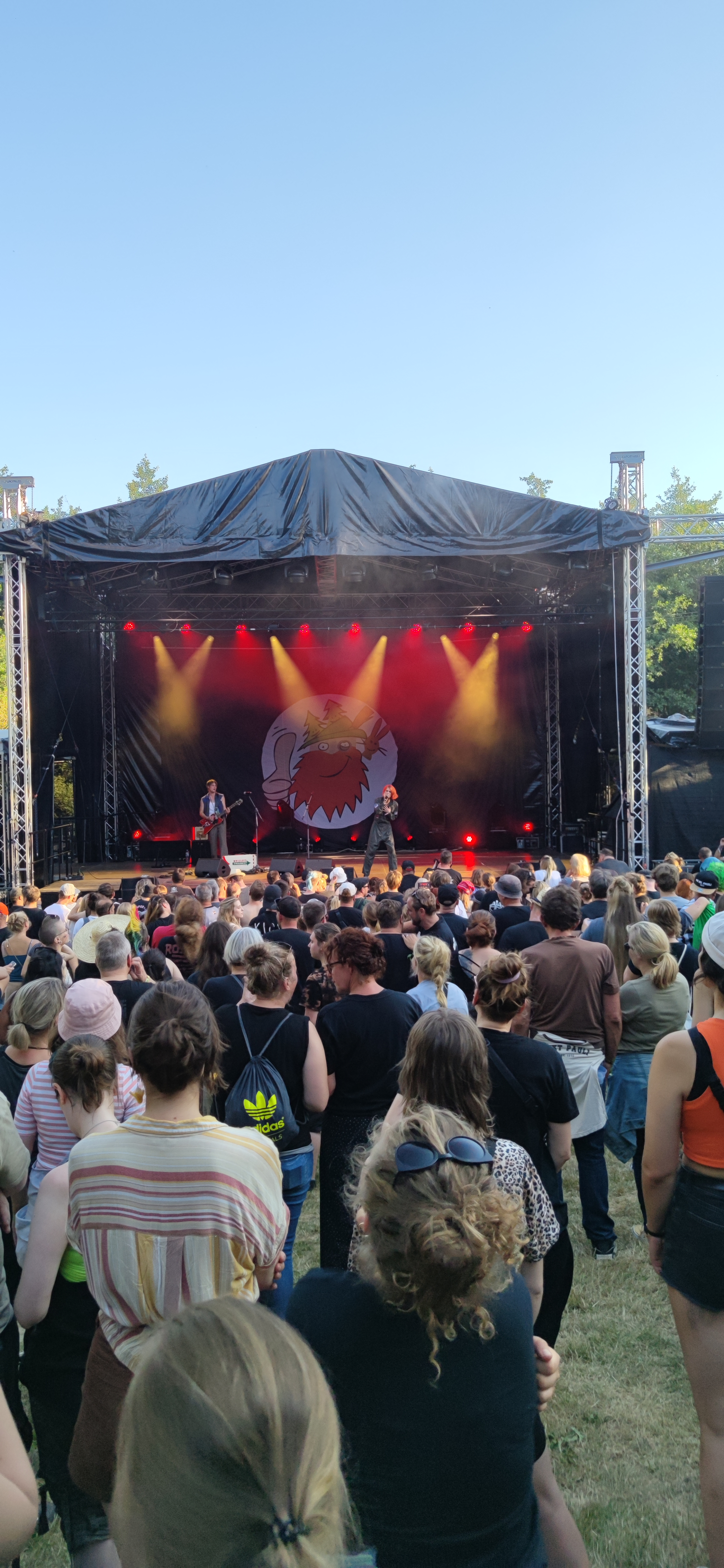
- Alli Neumann performing at the Jamel Rockt den Förster Festival in 2022
- Nickname: Forstrock-Festival
- Status: Active
- Genre: Music festival; Open-air music festival
- Date: 2007
- Frequency: Annually
- Locations: Jamel, Mecklenburg-Vorpommern
- Country: Germany
- Participants: 3000+
- Website: https://www.forstrock.de/en/

Jamel rockt den Förster, alternatively Forstrock-Festival, is an open-air music festival held in the village of Jamel in Mecklenburg-Vorpommern, Germany, since 2007. The organisers are Birgit and Horst Lohmeyer, the owners of the Forsthof Jamel. The music festival was started as a sign against right-wing extremism.

Manuela Schwesig, currently the minister-president of Mecklenburg-Vorpommern, and Sylvia Bretschneider, formerly the speaker of the Landtag of Mecklenburg-Vorpommern, were the festival's first patrons. After the death of Bretschneider, Birgit Hesse took over the patronage.

In 2025, the couple Birgit and Horst Lohmeyer were awarded the Aachener Friedenspreis for their engagement, especially for organizing the music festival.

Musicians and bands who have attended the music festival include Die Toten Hosen, Herbert Grönemeyer, Die Fantastischen Vier, Feine Sahne Fischfilet, Die Ärzte, Querbeat and Heaven Shall Burn.

== Background and festival history ==
Jamel is a village and district of the municipality of Gägelow in Mecklenburg-Vorpommern with about 40 people living there. Since the 1990s, the village is said to be a stronghold for right-wing extremists. The festival was started in 2007 by Horst and Birgit Lohmeyer who had moved to the village back in 2004 as a sign against the right-wing supremacy in Jamel.

In its history, the festival was targeted several times by right-wing extremists. In August 2015, just some days before the festival started, the barn was set on fire and in 2016 the tires of cars of the festival attendees were pierced. The arson attack in 2015 led to the spontaneous attendance of German punk band Die Toten Hosen at the festival which gained supraregional recognition afterwards. In 2016, German politicians Manuela Schwesig and Claudia Roth announced that they would visit the festival. To prevent riots, the festival is secured by a massive police presence every year.

On January 28, 2025, it was announced that the organisers would have to pay a fee of 0.70 EUR per square metre for the usage of the ground where the festival takes place. According to Birgit Lohmeyer, the fee for the use of 1.5 ha (3.7 acres) for four weeks would be around 10,500 EUR. The Lohmeyers called the resolution "impudence" and announced to they would check the decision juristically. On June 27, 2025, the court Verwaltungsgericht Schwerin declined an urgent decision about the organisational aspects of the festival. It stated that there would be enough time to act against the assessments and requirements of the district of Nordwestmecklenburg. The organisers, the Verein Gemeinsam für Frieden und Solidarität (GFS), IG Metall and DGB Nord filed a registration of the festival at the authorities as an assembly. In case of a successful registration, the festival could take place without paying any fees. The district of Nordwestmecklenburg announced that they would ban the sale of alcohol if the festival is registered as an assembly.

== Bands ==
Year	Bands	Attendance	Ref
2007	Groovista, Thronräuber, Wismar Rock Band, Quo Vadis, Gitarrenduo Tom & Martin, Country Dance Band		
2008	Absurdt, Restless Consumers, Cosmic Cowboys, Etepetete, Super Mario, 41 A Crash, Dreiberge, Voodoo Moon, Gitarrenduo Tom & Mario, Comeback, Pride 'n' Rock		
2009	Tom & Mario, Kyuchu, 41 A Crash, Stiff la Wolf & Band, Little Big Drummer, Vietsmorgen, Etepetete, HEADZ UP KING, A.D.E.L.		
2010	A. d. e. L., Stiff la Wolf & Band, Etepetete, Distordia, Kyuchu, Deadstars, pennydreadful, DigWah, Looks That Kill, halo		
2011	Holly Would Surrender, An Electric Avalanche, Twisted Shoes, Ragnaröek, Haudegen, Etepetete, 3/4 Noin, GoUK		
2012	Haudegen, Etepetete, Cameron Can, Rantanplan, Männerurlaub, Still Wasted, Are Those Your Friends, Ave, Audrey Fights Back, One Strike Left		
2013	Etepetete, Black/Rosie, McKinley Black & Ian Melrose, Tricky Lobsters, Tequila & the Sunrise Gang, Mad Maraboo Orchestra		
2014	Pottpoeten, Ohrenfeindt, Alphaville, Starfucker, Pfefferminz, Tequila & the Sunrise Gang, Sonuvab!tch, Crushing Caspars		
2015	Arsen, Callin Tommy, Motus, Lake, EISBRENNERsLaTINOconexion, Chawa Lilith Band, DaSKArtell, Terrorgruppe, Tequila & the Sunrise Gang, Die Toten Hosen		
2016	Wolf Maahn, Bela B, Captain Planet, Danube's Banks, Tequila & the Sunrise Gang, Madsen, Karl-Heinz Johnson, Ohrbooten, ZSK, Chawa Lilith Band, Die Ärzte, Fettes Brot, Sookee	1,200	
2017	Zaunpfahl, Goldroger, Die Sterne, Kraftklub, Slime, Theater, Schreng Schreng & La La, Schnipo Schranke, Das Auge Gottes, Schrottgrenze, Fehlfarben, Beatsteaks, Tequila & the Sunrise Gang	1,000+	
2018	KAFVKA, Fatoni, Dritte Wahl, Kettcar, Casper, Marteria, Herbert Grönemeyer, Antilopen Gang, Muff Potter, Bosse, Audio 88 & Yassin, Tequila & the Sunrise Gang, Karl-Heinz Johnson	1,500	
2019	Tequila & the Sunrise Gang, MIA., Donots, Feine Sahne Fischfilet, Samy Deluxe, Antje Schomaker, Thees Uhlmann, Max Herre, Strom und Wasser, Grossstadtgeflüster, Jay Jay and Friends, Arsen	1,200	
2020	cancelled due to the COVID-19 outbreak in Germany		
2021	Acht Eimer Hühnerherzen, Deine Cousine, Leoniden, Il Civetto, Bukahara, Igor Levit, Danger Dan	450	
2022	Planlos, Alli Neumann, Team Scheisse, Thees Uhlmann, Haiyti, Kreator, Shirley Holmes, Alex Mofa Gang, Mia Morgan, Amewu, Sportfreunde Stiller, Deichkind, Tequila & the Sunrise Gang	2,500	
2023	Sebastian Krumbiegel, NinaMarie, Juli, Bosse, Fury in the Slaughterhouse, Madsen, Larrikins, Berlin 2.0, Finna, Turbostaat, Blumfeld, Danger Dan, Tequila & the Sunrise Gang	3,000	
2024	Jiska, Wallis Bird, Tränen, Olli Schulz, Die Fantastischen Vier, Querbeat, Cava, Adam Angst, Ebow, Selig, Element of Crime, Heaven Shall Burn, Tequila & the Sunrise Gang	3,500	
