= James Stern =

James Stern may refer to:

- James Stern (writer) (1904–1993), Anglo-Irish writer of short stories and non-fiction
- James D. Stern, American film and Broadway producer
- James Hart Stern (1964–2019), African American Baptist minister, civil rights activist and author
