= Jamali Maddix =

English stand-up comedian (born 1991)

- Born: 8 April 1991 (age 35); Ilford, London, England
- Occupation: Comedian
- Years active: 2014–present
- Known for: Never Mind the Buzzcocks, Taskmaster

Jamali Maddix (born 8 April 1991) is an English comedian. Maddix has appeared as a regular panellist on the reboot of Never Mind the Buzzcocks since 2021 and in 2020 appeared on series 11 of Taskmaster.

== Career ==
Maddix's career in comedy started unexpectedly when he took leave from his university course when he contracted a blood infection from a tattoo on his left arm, ultimately dropping out to pursue a career in comedy. According to Maddix, the day he came out of hospital was the same day a comedy competition was taking place, so he had enough time off university to take part in, and rehearse for, the finals of the competition; the competition was the 2014 Chortle Student Comedian of the Year award, which Maddix won.

Maddix hosted a documentary series on extremism titled Hate Thy Neighbor in partnership with Vice in 2016. In the series, Maddix interviews extremists from around the world to understand how they think. They included members of hate groups such as the National Socialist Movement, Azov Battalion, Nordic Resistance Movement, and the English Defence League.

From September 2021, Maddix has been a regular panellist on the revived panel show Never Mind the Buzzcocks, hosted by Greg Davies. In July 2022, Maddix's podcast Spooky Shit won the title of Best Comedy Podcast at the British Podcast Awards. Maddix appeared on series 11 of Taskmaster, which was broadcast from April to May 2021, alongside Charlotte Ritchie, Lee Mack, Mike Wozniak and Sarah Kendall; he came in fourth place with 137 points.

In 2024, Channel 4 aired the series Jamali Maddix: Follow the Leader, where Maddix spent time with key figures in growing communities on the fringes of society.

== Personal life ==
Maddix was born in Ilford, East London and later attended the University of Salford. His father is Jamaican and his maternal grandfather is Greek, although for many years he had believed him to be Italian. In an episode of Big Zuu's Big Eats, recorded 12 December 2019, he said "My dad is Jamaican, my mum didn't know her pops and she always told me he was Italian, for some reason. I don't know, she said he's Italian, that's all she'll say, 'Ah, he's Italian.' And I remember, I was talking to mum one day and she goes, 'Ah no, he was Greek.' So, now I'm a quarter Greek, but I never knew I was a quarter Greek until now". His uncle is former footballer Danny Maddix.

Maddix is dyslexic and dyspraxic. Jamali has stated on numerous occasions during his stand-up performances and TV appearances that he considers himself to be a Buddhist. As of 2016, he still lived in Ilford with his mother, and in 2024 was living in East London. Maddix paid to become an ordained minister online as a joke when he was younger. Maddix has mentioned in interviews that if he weren't a comedian, he would likely be unemployed.
