= Shahrazad Ali =

American author

- Born: Atlanta, Georgia, United States
- Occupation: Author
- Spouses: Solomon Ali (m. 1965; died 1985) Yahya (died 2013)
- Children: 12
- Writing career
- Notable work: The Blackman's Guide to Understanding the Blackwoman (1989)

Shahrazad Ali is an American author of several books, including a paperback called The Blackman's Guide to Understanding the Blackwoman. The book was controversial bringing "forth community forums, pickets and heated arguments among Black people in many parts" of the United States when it was published in 1989.

== Book reviews ==
Stories about the book appeared in the Los Angeles Times, The New York Times, The Washington Post, Newsday, and Newsweek. Ali appeared on Tony Brown's Journal, the Sally Jessy Raphaël Show, The Phil Donahue Show, and Geraldo TV programs—and was parodied on In Living Color. The book reportedly brought black bookstores new business, while other black bookstores banned it. It also provoked a book of essays (called Confusion by Any Other Name) that explored the negative impact of The Blackman's Guide.

A sample passage of her book, among others quoted in the media, describes African American women referred to as the Blackwoman, using the parlance of the Nation of Islam stating:

Although not lazy by nature, she has become loose and careless about herself and about her man and family. Her brain is smaller than the Blackman's, so while she is acclaimed for her high scholastic achievement, her thought processes do not compare to the conscious Blackman's. Her unbridled tongue is the main reason she cannot get along with the Blackman...if she ignores the authority and superiority of the Blackman, there is a penalty. When she crosses this line and becomes viciously insulting, it is time for the Blackman to soundly slap her in the mouth.

Ali stated, "I wrote the book because Black women in America have been protected and insulated against certain kinds of criticism and examination." Critics complained that book offered no factual data to substantiate her views or information about how she came to her conclusions and was essentially a vanity press product that would have been ignored by Black people and others had it not been for the media attention its novelty and outrageousness created. Kimberlé Crenshaw has argued that Ali's views mirror a claim made by several commentators and public figures that many social problems in African American communities are caused by "the breakdown of patriarchal family values", including William Raspberry, George Will, Daniel Patrick Moynihan in his report The Negro Family, and Bill Moyers.

== Guest commentator ==
In August 2013, Ali re-emerged in the media as a guest commentator on the HLN program Dr. Drew on Call. She was also interviewed on The Trisha Goddard Show along with white supremacist Craig Cobb, agreeing with Cobb that the Black and white races should be separated.

== Personal life ==
Ali was married to Solomon Ali from 1965 until his death in 1985, and then to another man named Yahya until his death in 2013. She is the mother of 12 children, nine of them adopted.

== Selected bibliography ==
- How Not to Eat Pork (Or Life without the Pig), 1985 (ISBN 0933405006)
- The Blackman's Guide to Understanding the Blackwoman, 1989 (ISBN 0933405014)
- The Blackwoman's Guide to Understanding the Blackman, 1992 (ISBN 0933405030)
- Are You Still a Slave? 1994 (ISBN 0933405049)
- Day by Day, 1996 (ISBN 0933405057)
- How to Tell If Your Man Is Gay or Bisexual, 2003, (ISBN 978-0933405103)

In addition she has written some books no longer in print.

- Urban Survival for the Year 2000
- How to Prepare for the Y2K Computer Problem in the 'Hood
