= Hate Thy Neighbor (TV series) =

American television series

Hate Thy Neighbor is a Viceland series featuring Jamali Maddix. In the documentary, Maddix goes on tour and interviews members of highly-controversial groups such as NSM, Azov, EDL, and Nordic Youth.

== Series overview ==
Season	Episodes	Originally released	
Season	Episodes	First released	Last released
1	6	January 23, 2017	February 27, 2017
2	10	January 23, 2018	March 27, 2018

== Episode list ==
=== Season 1 (2017) ===
No.	Title	Directed by	Original release date
1	"America's Far White"	Danni Mynard	January 23, 2017
In the series premiere, Jamali meets members of the Nationalist Socialist Movement, the largest neo-Nazi group in the U.S.
2	"Hunting the White Devil"	Danni Mynard	January 30, 2017
Jamali travels to Harlem, where he meets the Israelite School of Universal Practical Knowledge, black separatists who believe they are descendants of the Twelve Tribes of Israel.
3	"Football, Fascists & the Frontline"	Danni Mynard	February 6, 2017
Jamali heads to Ukraine, where he meets with Azov Brigade, a far-right militant group with neo-Nazi roots.
4	"Forbidden Love in Israel"	Danni Mynard	February 13, 2017
Jamali travels to the Holy Land, where he encounters the Lehava, a Jewish anti-assimilation group.
5	"Sweden's Far Right Youth"	Danni Mynard	February 20, 2017
Jamali travels to Sweden, where he meets the Nordic Youth, a group opposed to mass immigration.
6	"Britain's Everyday Extremism"	Danni Mynard	February 27, 2017
Jamali goes back to Britain to investigate the future of the country and Britain's acceptance of multiculturalism and racism following Brexit.

=== Season 2 (2018) ===
No.	Title	Directed by	Original release date
1	"Love and Hate in the Deep South"	Yemi Bamiro	January 23, 2018
Jamali spends time with hate preacher Ruben Israel and his fundamentalist disciples as they protest the New Orleans "Southern Decadence" festival.
2	"The Fight Over Free Speech"	Yemi Bamiro	January 30, 2018
Jamali hangs out with conservative students as tensions on campus rise during UC Berkeley's "Free Speech Week."
3	"Prison Camp for Kids"	Yemi Bamiro	February 6, 2018
Jamali travels to South Carolina to spend the weekend with a group of kids enrolled in a "correctional weekend" that promises to deter kids from a life of crime.
4	"Pro-lifers"	Yemi Bamiro	February 13, 2018
With the abortion debate reignited, Jamali spends time with two passionate but very different pro-life preachers.
5	"Black Rebel"	Yemi Bamiro	February 20, 2018
Jamali explores the highly charged issue surrounding the Confederate Flag with guidance from an unlikely champion, "The Black Rebel."
6	"The White House Preacher"	Yemi Bamiro	February 27, 2018
Jamali heads to South Carolina to work out how pastor Mark Burns went from small town preacher to a member of President Trump's Evangelical Advisory Board.
7	"Border Vigilantes"	Yemi Bamiro	March 6, 2018
Jamali spends time with two vigilante groups intent on protecting the border between Mexico and the USA.
8	"Feminism 101"	Yemi Bamiro	March 13, 2018
With people talking more than ever before about women's rights Jamali investigates what it means to be a third wave, second wave and anti-feminist.
9	"United States of Oil and Gas"	Yemi Bamiro	March 20, 2018
With Native Americans in Oklahoma split on the benefits of oil and gas production in their sacred land, Jamali tries to understand both sides of the fight.
10	"Sovereign Citizens"	Yemi Bamiro	March 27, 2018
Jamali finds and follows those who refuse to recognize the US government, its laws and its currency, gaining themselves the FBI classification of domestic terrorists.
