= Murder of Jeff Hall =

Regional leader of the National Socialist Movement

Coordinates: 33.95045°N 117.30502°W

Jeff Hall
- Born: Jeffrey Russell Hall; November 21, 1978
- Died: May 1, 2011 (aged 32); Riverside, California, U.S.
- Cause of death: Gunshot wound
- Citizenship: United States
- Occupation: Plumber
- Title: Southwestern States Regional Director
- Political party: National Socialist Movement
- Spouse: Krista McCary
- Children: Joseph, Shirley, and three others

Jeffrey Russell Hall was a plumber in Riverside, California, and a regional leader of the National Socialist Movement, a neo-Nazi organization. On May 1, 2011, he was fatally shot by his 10-year-old son Joseph. The murder took place at 4 a.m. as Hall slept on his couch.

Hall believed in fighting for an all-white society and had said that he would die for the cause.

According to the boy, the motive for the murder was that he was tired of his father hitting him and his stepmother.

On September 25, 2011, the story of the murder was broadcast on 60 Minutes. In 2013, when Joseph was 13, he was sentenced to 10 years in a California juvenile facility.

== Family history ==
Jeffrey Hall was previously married to Leticia Neal, having two children with her, Joseph and Shirley. Joseph was born June 19, 2000. The two divorced some time after, after which Neal had twins by another father. In 2003, the twins were hospitalized for failing to thrive, resulting in Child Protective Services removing Hall's two children. Social workers reported that Neal's home had no electricity or gas, that there were maggots on dishes, and that the children were dirty, malnourished, and had bruises. At the time, Hall was on probation for driving under the influence. As a result, his two children were temporarily placed with their grandmother. In 2004, Hall was granted full custody of his children.

After divorcing Neal, Hall married Krista McCary and had three more daughters with her. At the time of his death, he had five children. His former wife Neal moved out of California and remarried, then she came back to California only a month before the shooting, and was attempting to regain custody of her son.

According to his grandmother, Joseph was a volatile and violent child. He had been expelled from several schools for attacking students and staff, once nearly choking a teacher with a phone cord. She said he had no understanding of cause and effect. Joseph also had developmental disabilities including ADHD and low average intelligence. Joseph and his sisters had been educated at home by their parents under the guidance of River Springs Charter School.

== Hall's neo-Nazi activity ==
For three years, 32-year-old Hall had been having difficulty finding work because of the economic downturn in the construction industry. Due to his perception that Jews and non-whites were responsible for a thinning job market, he became a local leader in the Neo-Nazi movement.

In October 2009, Hall led a group from the National Socialist Movement (NSM) in a rally near a day-laborer site in Riverside. They wore World War II-era Nazi garb. In a November 2009 interview about the rallies in Riverside, Arizona, and Minnesota, Hall said, "They're proud of who they are, tired of white guilt being shoved on their kids and multiculturalism. They can't see any reason for it."

In 2010, he ran for election against an incumbent for the Western Municipal Water District board as a white supremacist, and he received about a third of the vote.

In March 2011, Hall and his group of about two dozen white supremacists took to the streets in the affluent, primarily residential Claremont, Los Angeles County, sometimes called "The City of Trees and Ph.D.s". They had a screaming confrontation with counter-protesters of more than 200 immigrant rights activists, who decried the group as racist. Hall said, "We patrol the borders, we see the devastation, we see the drugs, we know the reality." Dozens of officers from several police agencies were on hand.

Just 12 hours before Hall's death, a reporter from The New York Times was in Hall's home, interviewing him and members of his group. She also spoke to the ten-year-old, who showed off a leather belt bearing a silver insignia of the Nazi SS that his father had given him.

== Death ==
Hall bragged that he was teaching his eldest son Joseph to use night-vision equipment and to shoot a gun. The ten-year-old child told police how he took a .357 revolver from a shelf in the closet, pulled the hammer back, aimed the gun at his father's ear while he was asleep on the couch, and shot him on May 1, 2011.

Joseph told police that the day before the shooting, his father had threatened to remove all the smoke detectors and burn the house down while the family slept. Joseph admitted that he was tired of his dad hitting him and his mother. His 26-year-old stepmother, Krista, also said that Hall had been violent with her and the son, sometimes losing control and kicking his son in the back. He punished his children in various ways on a daily basis. The police report said that the house was filthy with the floor littered with clothes and a pervasive odor of urine. Many weapons were accessible to the children.

The son was arrested and taken to juvenile hall, while the other four children were taken into protective custody. Krista was later arrested and charged with criminal storage of firearms and child neglect. Joann Patterson, Jeff's mother and Joseph's grandmother, was given temporary custody of the other four children. In a 60 Minutes interview, she said that she was not surprised that Joseph had killed his father, but that she had expected it would not happen until he was older, and said she thought that Jeff becoming a neo-Nazi had hastened it. She also said that he had misbehaved by starting fires.

The son stated his motivation for the killing was an episode of Criminal Minds, where he claimed he saw a child shoot his abusive father and did not face any consequences for it. He also believed his father would recover from being shot and that the two of them could reconcile.

== Trial ==
Despite his age, ten-year-old Joseph Hall was charged with the murder of his father. If convicted, he faced incarceration at a juvenile detention facility, although he could not have been held past the age of 25.

Joseph's attorneys initially considered a defense of not guilty by reason of insanity. The defense argued that the child had developmental disabilities and was conditioned to violence by growing up in an abusive household. According to court records, Joseph was of low intelligence and suffered from attention deficit hyperactivity disorder. Joseph's public defender quoted the boy as saying, "I thought if I shoot him maybe he won't be able to hurt us."

Prosecutors claimed that the murder was premeditated. According to the prosecution, Joseph told his sister days in advance that he had planned on shooting their father. He also had a history of violent behavior dating back to kindergarten, when he stabbed a teacher with a pencil. The district attorney portrayed Jeff Hall as a "loving father" and contended that his Nazism had nothing to do with the murder.

In 2013, Joseph was found guilty of murder. The judge ruled that "the minor knew what he did was wrong" and that "there was planning and understanding in the commission of this crime." During the sentencing hearing, lawyers presented evidence about Joseph's psychological well-being. Joseph was sentenced to juvenile detention until he reached the age of 23, which happened on June 19, 2023.

In 2015, the California Supreme Court declined to take Joseph's case, letting stand a ruling that a 10-year-old should be able to understand his Miranda rights. The United States Supreme Court also declined to hear the case, denying a petition for a writ of certiorari in 2016.

== See also ==
- Patricide – Act of killing one's father
