= National Socialist Movement (United States) =

American neo-Nazi organization

- Abbreviation: NSM
- Leader: Burt Colucci (Note: Ownership of the organization is disputed between Colucci and the estate of James Hart Stern, although Colucci is the de facto leader and controls the NSM website.)
- Founders: Robert Brannen; Greg Hurles; James Mason
- Founded: March 18, 1975; 51 years ago
- Split from: NSWPP
- Headquarters: Lakeland, Florida
- Newspaper: NSM Magazine (2007-2017)
- Youth wing: Viking Youth Corp (inactive)
- Membership: c. 400 (2011)
- Ideology: Neo-Nazism; White supremacy; Anti-LGBTQ
- Political position: Far-right
- International affiliation: World Union of National Socialists
- Colors: Red, white and blue (national colors); Black (customary)
- Ethnic group: White Americans

Party flag

Website
- nsm88.org

The National Socialist Movement (NSM or NSM88) (Note: NSM88 is sometimes used to distinguish the group from other entities using the NSM abbreviation, and NSM88 is used in the URL of the group's website. It combines the group's initials and the number 88, which is an abbreviation for "Heil Hitler" used by neo-Nazis.) is a neo-Nazi organization based in the United States. Although it was once considered to be the largest and most prominent neo-Nazi organization in the United States, since the late 2010s its membership and prominence have plummeted. It was a part of the Nationalist Front and it is classified as a hate group by the Southern Poverty Law Center.

The NSM is described by the Anti-Defamation League as "one of the more explicitly neo-Nazi groups in the United States." It seeks the transformation of the United States into a white ethnostate from which Jews, non-Whites, and members of the LGBTQ community would be expelled and barred from citizenship.

== History ==
=== Early history ===
Robert Brannen (second from left) at a 1977 meeting of the White Confederacy.

The NSM was a schism of the National Socialist White People's Party (NSWPP) in the years following the assassination of George Lincoln Rockwell.

The National Socialist Movement was founded on March 18, 1975 in St. Paul, Minnesota, by Robert Brannen, Greg Hurles, and James Mason, immediately after Mason was released from prison. It has often been incorrectly reported that the group was founded earlier by Brannen and Clifford "Cliff" Herrington. Herrington knew the founders and affiliated early on, but was not involved in its founding.

It aimed to promote militancy in the various other schisms as a continuation of Joseph Tommasi's ideology. Tommasi was soon also killed; the NSM soon became heavily intertwined with his National Socialist Liberation Front group. Mason chose the name National Socialist Movement, as he considered it the "most generic and the least pretentious label possible", and chose the word movement in order to "avoid the term party at all costs".

Brannen originally served as the group's leader, but in 1983, Herrington succeeded him after Brannen had suffered multiple strokes. The group was tiny and largely unknown until 1993, when Herrington and another member wore Nazi uniforms to a Minnesota legislative committee hearing to protest a proposed gay rights bill.

=== Jeff Schoep ===
==== Leadership transfer, Herrington's departure ====
In 1994, Jeff Schoep became the group's chairman, a position which he held until January 2019. Clifford Herrington remained co-chairman of the NSM until 2006. That year, he and his family left the NSM after conflict within the NSM following the discovery that his wife, Andrea M. Herrington, was the "high-priestess" of the theistic Satanist organization and website Joy of Satan Ministries. At the time, Joy of Satan Ministries shared a P.O. box address with an Oklahoma chapter of the NSM.

The Herringtons' ties with Joy of Satan Ministries had caused several top members belonging to the Christian Identity movement to leave in anger. This revelation exposed the religious division in the NSM between the Odinists, Christians and theistic Satanists. The Christian Identity movement holds that only white people are eligible for salvation. Another member, Bill White, was forced out of the NSM by Schoep after publicly ridiculing Christian Identity theology in defense of Herrington. Despite his official departure from the NSM, Cliff Herrington participated in a handful of NSM events in 2009 and 2010.

==== Other activities ====
In 2004, it was revealed that the NSM's Indiana state leader, John Edward Snyder, was a convicted rapist who had been released from prison and banned from having contact with minors in 2003.

The National Socialist Movement was responsible for leading the demonstration which sparked the 2005 Toledo riot. In April 2006, they held a rally on the State Capitol steps in Lansing, Michigan, which was met by a larger counter-rally and ended in scuffles.

In January 2007, Gordon Creal Young, a former Ku Klux Klan leader in Maryland who had disbanded his chapter to join the NSM was arrested for statutory rape. He was accused of forcing an underaged girl to perform fellatio on him on two separate occasions, but was eventually acquitted.

In December 2007, the organization's headquarters was moved to Detroit, Michigan.

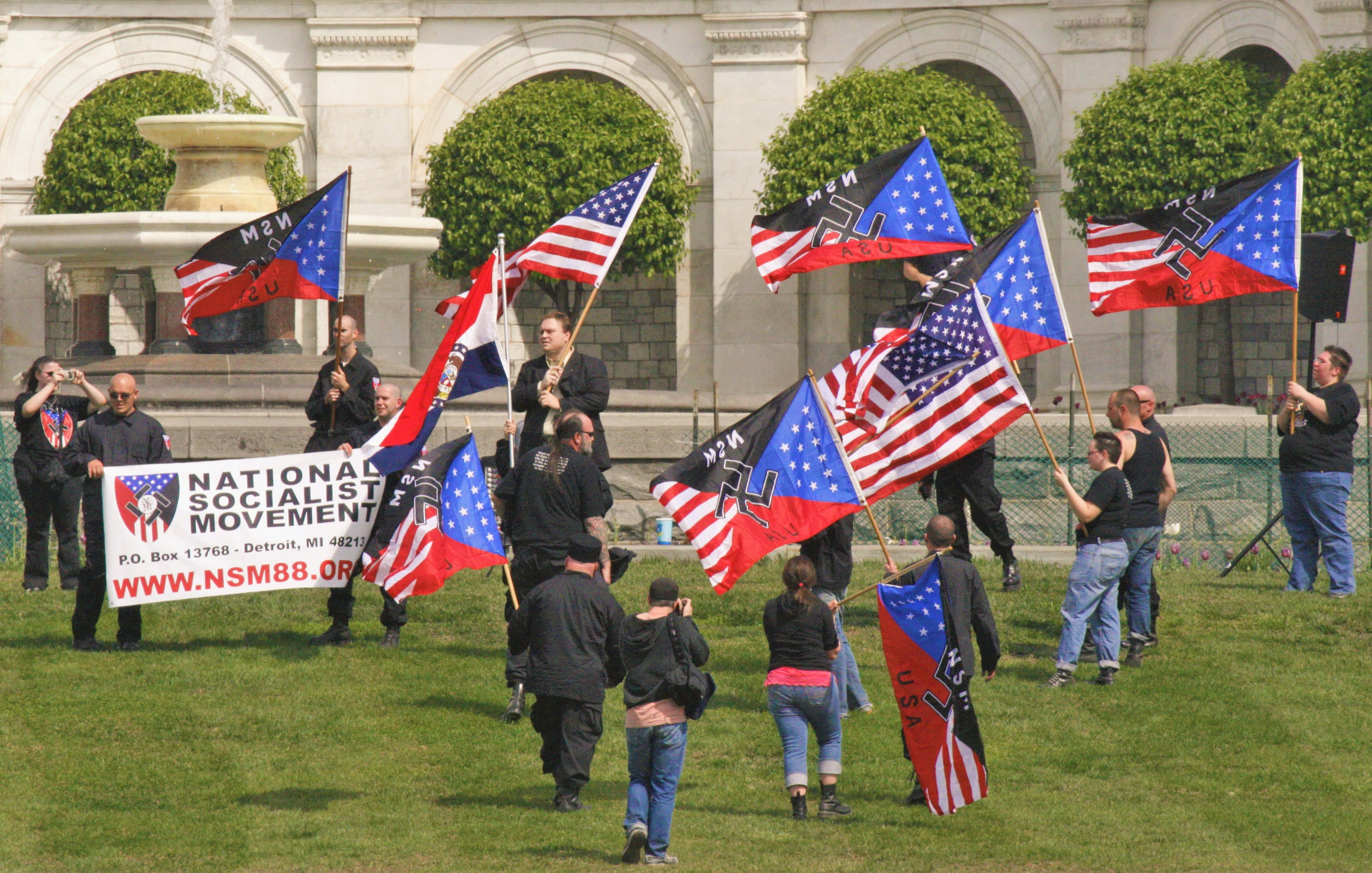
NSM rally on the west lawn of the U.S. Capitol building, Washington, D.C., 2008

In January 2008, Mariusz Wdziekonski, a 21-year-old NSM member was charged after vandalizing 57 graves at the Westlawn Cemetery, a Jewish cemetery in Illinois. He was a Polish immigrant who had been in the United States since 2004. On December 17, 2010, he was convicted on two counts of felony vandalism and sentenced to 7 years in prison, the maximum sentence.

In January 2009, the National Socialist Movement sponsored a half-mile section of U.S. Highway 160 outside of Springfield, Missouri, as part of the Adopt-A-Highway Trash Cleanup program. The highway was later renamed the "Rabbi Abraham Joshua Heschel Memorial Highway" by the state legislature.

In 2009, the National Socialist Movement had 61 chapters in 35 states, making it the largest neo-Nazi group in the United States according to the Southern Poverty Law Center. In this year, Wikileaks published internal NSM emails on their website.

On April 17, 2010, 70 members of the National Socialist Movement demonstrated in front of the Los Angeles City Hall, drawing a counter protest of hundreds of anti-fascist demonstrators.

On May 1, 2011, Jeff Hall, a leader of the California branch of the National Socialist Movement, was killed by his 10-year-old emotionally troubled son, who claimed he was tired of Hall beating him and his stepmother. Hall had run in 2010 for a seat on the board of directors of a Riverside County water board, a race in which he earned approximately 30% of the vote. Around this time, the National Socialist Movement was described by The New York Times as being "the largest supremacist group, with about 400 members in 32 states, though much of its prominence followed the decay of Aryan Nation and other neo-Nazi groups".

The National Socialist Movement held a rally on September 3, 2011, in West Allis, Wisconsin, to protest incidents at the Wisconsin State Fair on August 5, 2011, when a large crowd of young African-Americans allegedly targeted and beat white people as they left the fair around 11 p.m. Police claimed that the incident began as a fight among African-American youths that was not racially motivated. Dan Devine, the mayor of West Allis, stated on September 2, 2011, "I believe I speak for the citizens when I say they [the National Socialist Movement] are not welcome here."

In August 2012, the NSM's Nevada state leader, Josh Davenport, was arrested on kidnapping and sexual assault charges. He was alleged to have kidnapped and raped a 13-year-old girl at gunpoint before she escaped his apartment.

On September 22, 2013, the NSM held a meeting in Leith, North Dakota in support of Craig Cobb's attempt to turn the town into a neo-Nazi stronghold. The meeting was met by a counterprotest drawing hundreds of participants, most of whom were Native Americans from the Standing Rock Sioux Reservation and other nearby reservations.

In June 2016, the group helped organize with the Traditionalist Worker Party the rally which turned into the 2016 Sacramento riot.

In November 2016, following the first election of Donald Trump, the organization replaced the swastika in its logo and flag with the Odal SS-rune in an attempt to enter mainstream politics, which they would use until March 2019.

In January 2017, the pilot of the television series Hate Thy Neighbor featured the National Socialist Movement and prominent member Daniel Burnside.

=== "Unite the Right" and decline ===
In August 2017, the NSM and their former coalition, the Nationalist Front, infamously participated in the Unite the Right rally in Charlottesville, Virginia. During the rally, a counter-protestor was murdered and thirty-five more were injured in a car ramming attack. After the rally, two lawsuits targeting 21 racist "alt-right" and hate group leaders, including the National Socialist Movement and Schoep, were filed in the U.S. District Court for the Western District of Virginia (Sines v. Kessler) and another lawsuit was filed in Virginia Circuit Court.

The attacker was not an NSM member, although he had been photographed holding a shield that was handed out by Vanguard America, which was part of the Nationalist Front. Vanguard America condemned the attack and said the attacker was not a member but rather the shields had been handed out to anyone interested.

Nonetheless, the legal consequences stemming from their participation in Charlottesville led to the collapse of the Nationalist Front and the decline of the NSM. Their last significant rally would be held in October 2017, a "White Lives Matter" rally in Shelbyville, Tennessee which drew around 100 white supremacists and around 200 counter-protestors. An additional rally was planned in nearby Murfreesboro but was cancelled, although the accompanying counter-protest and anti-racist march was not cancelled and drew nearly 1,000 participants. Schoep's Twitter account was suspended on December 18, 2017. By February 2018, the Nationalist Front had crumbled.

In April 2018, the NSM's annual rally to celebrate Hitler's birthday drew only around two dozen participants and around 100 counter-protestors. In November 2018, the National Socialist movement held a rally at the Arkansas State Capitol, which would be their last under the leadership of Schoep. Twenty people participated, and one member was seen carrying the flag of the AWB as well as the flag of apartheid-era South Africa.

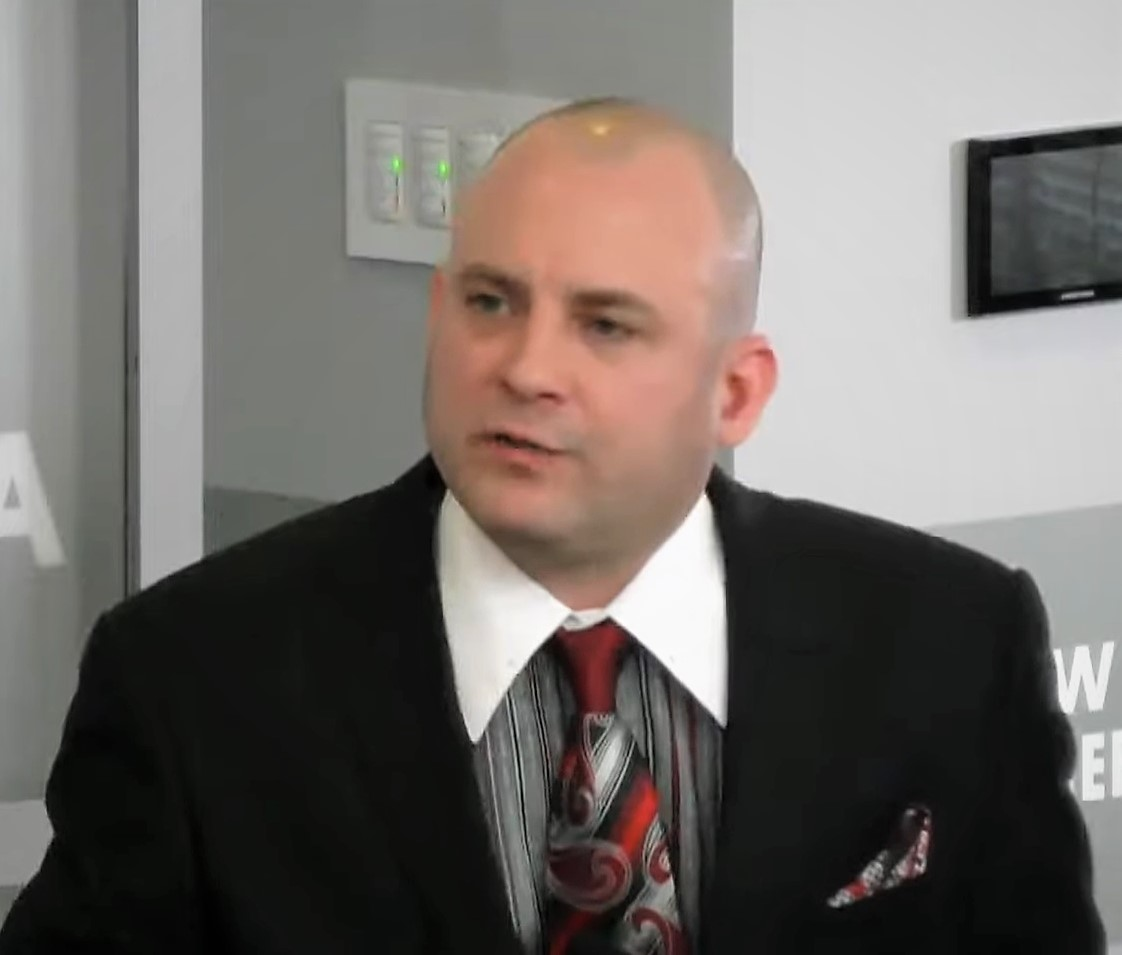
Schoep at New America in 2019

==== James Hart Stern ====
On February 28, 2019, the Associated Press reported that, according to Michigan corporate records, Schoep had been replaced as director and president of the National Socialist Movement in January by James Hart Stern, a Black civil rights activist.

In 2014, Stern and Schoep became friends when Schoep called Stern to ask about his connection to Edgar Ray Killen, the head of the Klan chapter that Stern dissolved. (Note: Stern met Klan leader Edgar Ray Killen in prison while Stern was serving a 5-year sentence for wire fraud and the two shared a cell. Before he died, Killen gave Stern power of attorney and land rights, which Stern utilized to dissolve the Klan chapter.) When Stern learned that Schoep was a white supremacist, he arranged for a meeting between the two men. They engaged in debates about the Holocaust, the swastika, White nationalism, and the fate of the National Socialist Movement, with Stern attempting to change Schoep's mind. He could not do that, but in 2019, Schoep came to him and asked for his advice concerning the group's legal problems. Schoep had wanted to leave the NSM because he feared the legal repercussions of their involvement in the Unite the Right rally. Stern then encouraged Schoep to turn control of the NSM over to him, and Schoep agreed.

Stern filed documents with a federal court in Virginia, asking that it issue a judgment against the group before one of the pending Charlottesville-related lawsuits went to trial, but because the law does not allow a corporation to be its own attorney, Stern looked for outside counsel to re-file the papers.

Stern originally did not plan to dissolve the movement, in order to prevent any of its former members from reincorporating it, but he planned to use his position to undermine the group. He wanted to turn the group's website into a website for Holocaust education, took credit for Schoep's decision to replace the swastika with the Odal SS-rune as the group's symbol, and said that he would be meeting with Schoep to sign a proclamation in which the movement would disavow white supremacy.

The group's former community outreach director, Matthew Heimbach, who had been kicked out of the NSM because his economic views were seen as "too left-wing", stated that the NSM resisted Schoep's reforms because, in his eyes, they wanted it to be a "politically impotent white supremacist gang." Heimbach estimated that the group had 40 dues-paying members as of 2018. In a video posted on his blog, Stern took credit for "eradicating" the National Socialist Movement.

==== Burt Colucci ====
In March 2019, Schoep announced that he was leaving the NSM and he was giving his position to Burt Colucci. He declared that Stern was not the legitimate leader of the organization. Since then, Schoep has renounced his racist past and he has also renounced his involvement in all racist groups.

Despite Stern's efforts, Colucci continued to operate the group's website. Colucci quickly reversed the reforms made by Schoep, and he reinstated the swastika as the group's official symbol.

The dispute over the leadership of the NSM led to a legal battle between Stern and Colucci, and as a result, each of them filed corporation registrations in their respective home states: Stern in California, and Colucci in Florida. The original incorporation in Michigan was dissolved in June 2019. Stern also filed a lawsuit seeking a ruling barring anyone from interfering in his operation of the group, but he died of bladder cancer in October 2019, leaving Colucci as the de facto leader of the NSM.

The NSM does not keep an official count of its membership, but according to the Anti-Defamation League, since Colucci took control of the NSM, its membership has fallen to one or two dozen and it has continued to fail to attract a significant amount of participation at its events, leading the ADL to comment that the dispute between Stern and Colucci negatively impacted the group's reputation.

Colucci and nine other members of the NSM protested against a Detroit pride festival in June 2019, in a rally that garnered international attention, during which NSM members destroyed (and pretended to urinate on) an Israeli flag.

In April 2021, Colucci was arrested on aggravated assault charges in Phoenix, Arizona. Witnesses said he pulled a gun and aimed it at a black man, making threatening and racist remarks. The incident began with a dispute over trash pickup. His bail was set at $7,500. Two days before his arrest, he led a group of 15 members of the National Socialist Movement in a rally, but they expected that 100 people would attend the rally. According to a January 2022 indictment, Colucci was instead charged with two counts of misdemeanor disorderly conduct and one count of felony disorderly conduct.

On November 23, 2021, a federal court in Virginia found the National Socialist Movement and its former leader, Jeff Schoep, liable on charges of civil conspiracy in the Sines v. Kessler case against the organizers of the 2017 "Unite the Right" rally.

In January 2022, Colucci was arrested again along with two other members of the NSM after they attacked David Newstat, a Jewish man who confronted them during a rally. Colucci and one other member were both charged with assault, and the other member was charged with grand theft. Colucci was not convicted until April 2024. He was found guilty of misdemeanor battery, although he had originally been charged with assault and battery with hate crime enhancements. He was scheduled to be sentenced on May 2, 2024.

In June 2023, Colucci led 4 other members in a rally in Lakeland, Florida, but he also expected that 100 people would attend this rally.

== See also ==
- List of neo-Nazi organizations
- Neo-Nazi groups in the United States
