= Leith, North Dakota =

Leith
- City
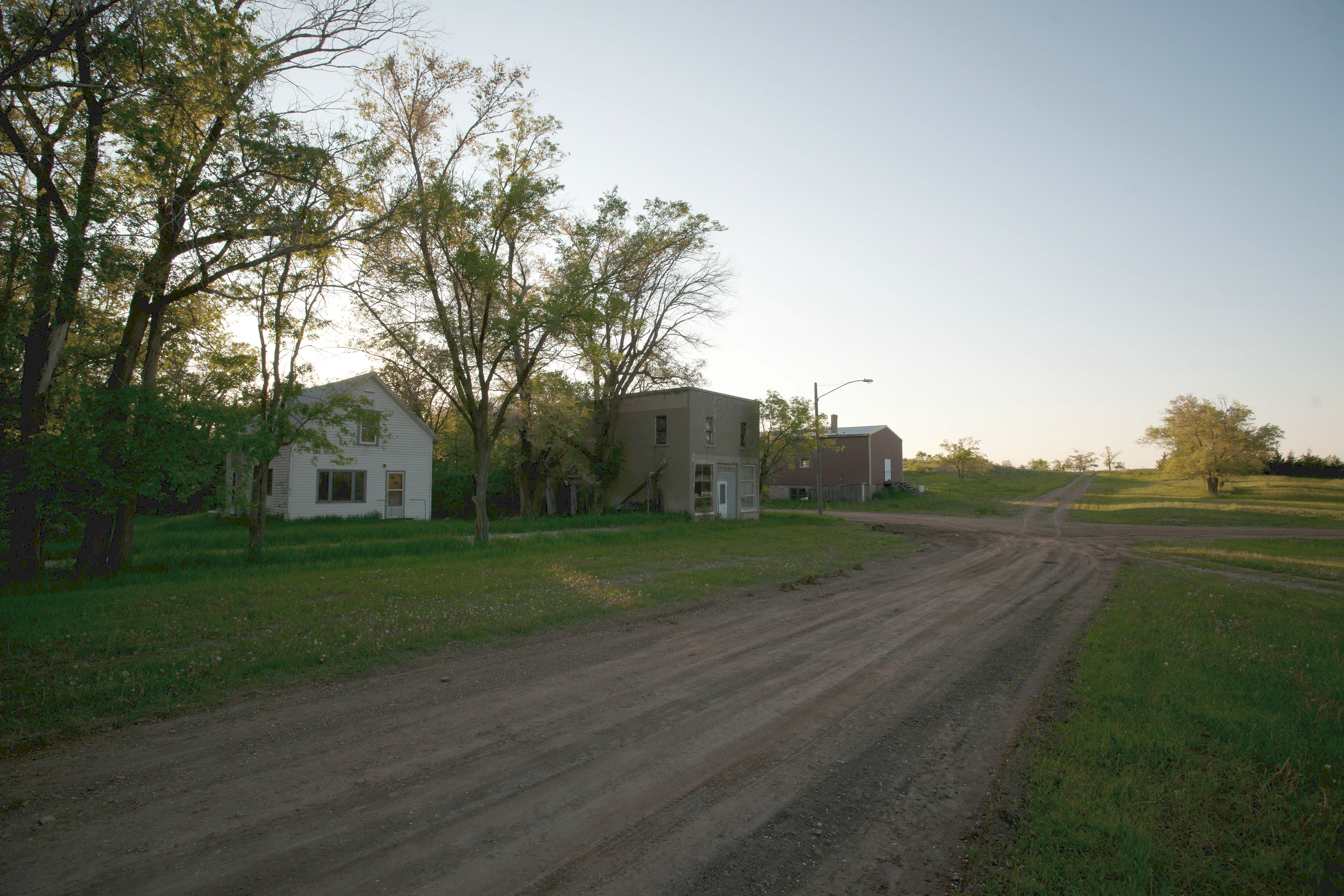
- Leith in 2009

- Location within Grant County and North Dakota
- Coordinates: 46°21′45″N 101°38′19″W
- Country: United States
- State: North Dakota
- County: Grant
- Founded: 1910

Government
  - Mayor: Ryan Schock

Area
  - Total: 0.48 sq mi (1.25 km^{2})
  - Land: 0.48 sq mi (1.24 km^{2})
  - Water: 0.0077 sq mi (0.02 km^{2})
- Elevation: 2,333 ft (711 m)

Population (2020)
  - Total: 28
  - Estimate (2022): 26
  - Density: 22.6/sq mi (8.74/km^{2})
- Time zone: UTC–7 (Mountain (MST))
  - Summer (DST): UTC–6 (MDT)
- ZIP code: 58529
- Area code: 701
- FIPS code: 38-45860
- GNIS feature ID: 1036126

Leith (/ˈliːθ/ LEETH) is a city in Grant County, North Dakota, United States. The population was 28 at the 2020 census.

== History ==
Leith was founded in 1910 along a Milwaukee Road branch line that separated from the railroad's Pacific Extension in McLaughlin, South Dakota, and ran to New England, North Dakota. The name was given by railroad officials and comes from the harbor town of Leith near Edinburgh, Scotland. This line was abandoned in 1984, isolating Leith, as none of the primary highways in the area were constructed to go through the city.

=== Neo-Nazis ===
In 2011, a white supremacist named Craig Cobb began buying land in Leith, owning at least 12 plots of land by September 2013. Cobb wanted to move in other white supremacists so he could gain an electoral majority, take over the city government, and transform Leith into a neo-Nazi stronghold. This initiative was strongly supported by the National Socialist Movement (NSM), which was considered at the time to be the largest and most prominent neo-Nazi organization in the United States, but was strongly opposed by locals. Some locals advocated disincorporating the town to prevent Cobb's takeover. On September 22, 2013, an anti-racist protest was held in Leith. The protest drew hundreds of participants, mostly Native Americans from the Standing Rock Sioux Reservation and other nearby reservations. It was held on the same day an NSM meeting was scheduled in Leith. In November 2013, Cobb and one of his followers were arrested after confronting another resident with a shotgun and a rifle.

In February 2014, Cobb accepted a plea bargain and was sentenced to four years of supervised probation. He was fitted with an ankle monitor and banned from returning to Leith. Today, Cobb no longer owns any buildings in Leith. He deeded six properties back to the town at no charge and sold off a few others. Three were still owned by other white supremacists, but they showed little inclination to take up where Cobb left off.

After two people suspected of ties to Cobb were elected to the city council in June 2018, mayor Ryan Schock circulated a petition to disincorporate Leith. Both of them denied having any affiliations with Cobb or with any white supremacist movements. The Grant County commission subsequently cleared the way for a referendum on July 23, 2018 on dissolving the city. However, due to concerns that the original date was earlier than Century Code (state statutes) permitted, the vote was moved to November 6, the day of the 2018 midterm elections. As of July 2024, the city of Leith was still listed on the website of Grant County.

== Geography ==
Although Leith is legally termed a city, under North Dakota law, it can be described as a hamlet in geographic terms. According to the United States Census Bureau, the city has a total area of 1.24 square miles (3.21 km^{2}), of which 1.23 square miles (3.19 km^{2}) is land and 0.01 square miles (0.03 km^{2}) is water. Leith is located approximately 5 miles (8.0 km) southwest of Carson.

== Demographics ==
Historical population
Census	Pop.	Note	%±
1920	158		—
1930	174		10.1%
1940	166		−4.6%
1950	160		−3.6%
1960	100		−37.5%
1970	92		−8.0%
1980	59		−35.9%
1990	43		−27.1%
2000	28		−34.9%
2010	16		−42.9%
2020	28		75.0%
2022 (est.)	26		−7.1%
U.S. Decennial Census; 2020 Census

=== 2010 census ===
As of the census of 2010, there were 16 people, eight households, and five families residing in the city. The population density was 13.0 inhabitants per square mile (5.0/km^{2}). There were 18 housing units at an average density of 14.6 per square mile (5.6/km^{2}). The racial makeup of the city was 93.8% White and 6.3% African American (each person makes up 6.3% of the population).

There were 8 households, of which 12.5% had children under the age of 18 living with them, 50.0% were married couples living together, 12.5% had a female householder with no husband present, and 37.5% were non-families. 37.5% of all households were made up of individuals, and 25% had someone living alone who was 65 years of age or older. The average household size was 2.00 and the average family size was 2.60.

The median age in the city was 55 years. 12.5% of residents were under the age of 18; 0.0% were between the ages of 18 and 24; 25% were from 25 to 44; 31.4% were from 45 to 64; and 31.3% were 65 years of age or older. The gender makeup of the city was 50.0% male and 50.0% female.

=== 2000 census ===
As of the census of 2000, there were 28 people, 14 households, and 7 families residing in the city. The population density was 22.7 people per square mile (8.8/km^{2}). There were 21 housing units at an average density of 17.0 per square mile (6.6/km^{2}). The racial makeup of the city was 100.00% White.

There were 14 households, out of which none had children under the age of 18 living with them, 50.0% were married couples living together, 7.1% had a female householder with no husband present, and 42.9% were non-families. 42.9% of all households were made up of individuals, and 21.4% had someone living alone who was 65 years of age or older. The average household size was 2.00 and the average family size was 2.75.

In the city, the population was spread out, with 10.7% under the age of 18, 3.6% from 18 to 24, 35.7% from 25 to 44, 21.4% from 45 to 64, and 28.6% who were 65 years of age or older. The median age was 43 years. For every 100 females, there were 86.7 males. For every 100 females age 18 and over, there were 92.3 males.

The median income for a household in the city was $12,031, and the median income for a family was $21,250. Males had a median income of $16,250 versus $13,750 for females. The per capita income for the city was $8,171. There were 55.6% of families and 51.2% of the population living below the poverty line, including 100.0% of under eighteens and 20.0% of those over 64.

== See also ==
- Jamel, Germany
