= James Hart Stern =

American civil rights activist (1964–2019)

- Born: June 13, 1964; Los Angeles, California
- Died: October 11, 2019 (aged 55); Moreno Valley, California

James Hart Stern (June 13, 1964 – October 11, 2019) was an African American Baptist minister, civil rights activist, speaker, and author from Los Angeles, California. He was best known for his work defusing gang violence through a series of summits in the 1980s and 1990s and for his incarceration with Edgar Ray Killen, the former KKK leader who was convicted of the 1964 Mississippi Burning murders.

== Early life and education ==
Stern grew up in Watts, a Los Angeles neighborhood. The son of working-class parents, Stern was part of the thriving Black community in South Central Los Angeles. His father was a member of the Ethiopian Jewish community, though his mother was a devout Christian. As a teenager, he honed his public speaking skills and apprenticed as a pastor in Tabernacle of Faith Baptist Church under the tutelage of Reverend Frederick Douglas Ferrell, the first Black pastor elected to the California State Assembly, representing the 55th District from 1963-1966. Stern would become a Junior Deacon under Ferrell, eventually speaking at his funeral in 1982.

== Ministry and advocacy ==
After the passing of Ferrell, Stern found a new mentor in the man who took over Ferrell's position as head pastor of the Tabernacle of Faith Baptist Church, Charles Mims. The men developed a close relationship, and it was under Mims that Stern followed his vocation into the ministry. During his late teens and early twenties, Stern studied at both New Providence Theological Seminary and at Grace Bible Institute in Long Beach, California. After four years of study and apprenticeship, he was ordained in 1986 at the age of 22.

Through his work as a pastor, Stern was embroiled in the street level ramifications of gang violence. To make a change for his parishioners and his community, Stern organized a series of gang summits starting in 1988 to facilitate communication and decrease the violence. Gang leaders from Watts, Crenshaw, Compton, and South-Central Los Angeles met in secret locations to participate in the meetings. In August 1988, more than 50 gang members from the Bloods and the Crips stood on the steps of Los Angeles Court House with Stern and pledged to create a collective of "silent warriors" in an attempt to put a stop to gang violence.

In 1992, Stern founded Hands Across Watts, an organization whose mission it was to create a strong foundation for underprivileged youth in housing projects including Imperial Courts, Nickerson Gardens, and Jordan Down. Stern partnered with the members of the Bloods and the Crips for Hands Across Watts, all with the hope of preserving the truce forged in the previous gang summits.

Following the 1992 Los Angeles Riots, Stern organized a meeting between 85 gang leaders and the Korean-American Grocers Association (KAGRO). On May 26, 1992, the summit came together in a local hotel. The outcome was a truce between the two groups, abating some of the racial tension that had fueled the riots.

== Incarceration ==
In 2007, Stern was convicted on five counts of wire fraud. He had been the chief executive officer of the L.A. National Association of Cosmetology, an organization that handled electronic funds transfers (EFTs) and automated clearing house payments (ACH). Several employees skimmed money off the top of the transfers and implicated Stern in their scheme. Stern signed a plea deal for five years in prison, on the promise that he would be able to appeal. Throughout the process, Stern maintained his innocence on all charges throughout his incarceration.

Stern was extradited to Mississippi due to many of the charges against him having originated from victims there.

From August 2010 to November 2011, Stern shared a prison cell with Ku Klux Klan leader Edgar Ray Killen, who was convicted of murdering three civil rights leaders during the 1960s. Killen and Stern forged a close relationship and Killen hand wrote dozens of letters to Stern outlining his views on race as well as confessing to other crimes. In addition to the letters, the former leader of the KKK signed over power of attorney and his land in Mississippi to Stern. Stern detailed his experience in the 2017 book Killen the KKK, co-authored by North Carolina author Autumn K. Robinson. Using his power of attorney, Stern "disbanded" Killen's incarnation of the KKK on January 5, 2016.

Stern was released from prison on November 8, 2011.

He founded Racial Reconciliation Ministries, an organization dedicated to promoting conversations between people of all races and resolving racial conflict. Speaking and working with groups across the country, Stern spoke out on issues of race and coordinated with members of a wide variety of organizations.

Stern's biography, Mississippi Still Burning (From Hoods to suits), was published in 2018 by One Human Race Inc and co-authored by North Carolina writer Autumn Karen (as Autumn K. Robinson). Stern resided in Moreno Valley and was the CEO/President of Racial Reconciliation Outreach Ministries Inc. a 501 C.3. Non Profit organization and One Human Race Inc.

== National Socialist Movement ==
On February 28, 2019, the Associated Press reported that, according to Michigan corporate records, Stern had replaced Jeff Schoep as the leader of the National Socialist Movement, a long-standing white nationalist organization, in January of that year. Schoep had sought out legal advice from Stern and signed over the organization to him as part of an attempt to reform. Stern said at the time that he wanted to use his position to undermine the group. Stern filed documents with a federal court in Virginia, asking that it issue a judgment against the NSM before one of the Unite the Right rally-related lawsuits pending against the group went to trial.

== Death ==
Stern died of cancer at his home on October 11, 2019, at the age of 55.
