= Gägelow =

- Municipality
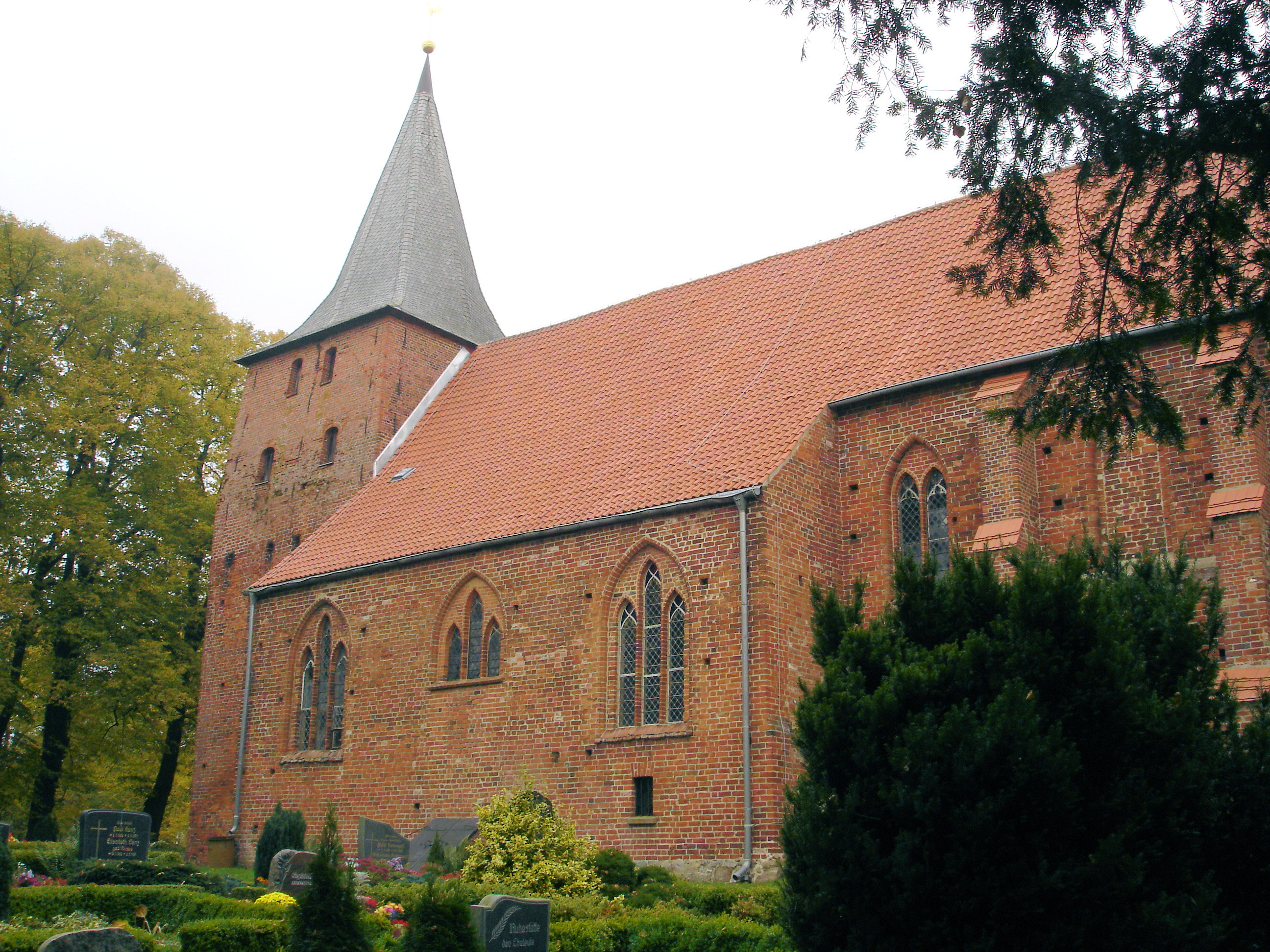
- The church in the village of Gressow

- Coat of arms

- Location of Gägelow within Nordwestmecklenburg district
- Interactive map of Gägelow
- Location within Germany Location within Mecklenburg-Vorpommern
- Coordinates: 53°53′56″N 11°22′54″E
- Country: Germany
- State: Mecklenburg-Vorpommern
- District: Nordwestmecklenburg
- Municipal assoc.: Grevesmühlen-Land

Government
  - Mayor: Christina Wandel

Area
  - Total: 22.61 km^{2} (8.73 sq mi)
- Elevation: 19 m (62 ft)

Population (2025-12-31)
  - Total: 2,520
  - Density: 111/km^{2} (289/sq mi)
- Time zone: UTC+01:00 (CET)
  - Summer (DST): UTC+02:00 (CEST)
- Postal codes: 23968
- Dialling codes: 03841
- Vehicle registration: NWM
- Website: Amt Grevesmühlen

Gägelow is a municipality in the Nordwestmecklenburg district, in Mecklenburg-Vorpommern, Germany.

== Geography ==
=== Hamlets of Gägelow ===
| Name | Coordinates |
|---|---|
| Gressow | 53°51′53″N 11°19′48″E |
| Jamel | 53°52′25″N 11°18′16″E |
| Neu Weitendorf | 53°54′25″N 11°21′17″E |
| Proseken | 53°54′20″N 11°22′10″E |
| Sternkrug | 53°51′42″N 11°18′22″E |
| Stofferstorf | 53°53′23″N 11°21′37″E |
| Voßkuhl | 53°52′38″N 11°21′09″E |
| Weitendorf | 53°53′46″N 11°21′15″E |
| Wolde | 53°53′01″N 11°20′51″E |

=== Jamel ===
Jamel, one of the hamlets in Gägelow, has become infamous because it is ruled by neo-Nazis.

== Coat of arms ==
The coat of arms of Gägelow were designed by Michael Zapfe of Wismar and approved by the Ministry of the Interior on the 4th of November, 1996.

== Photogallery ==
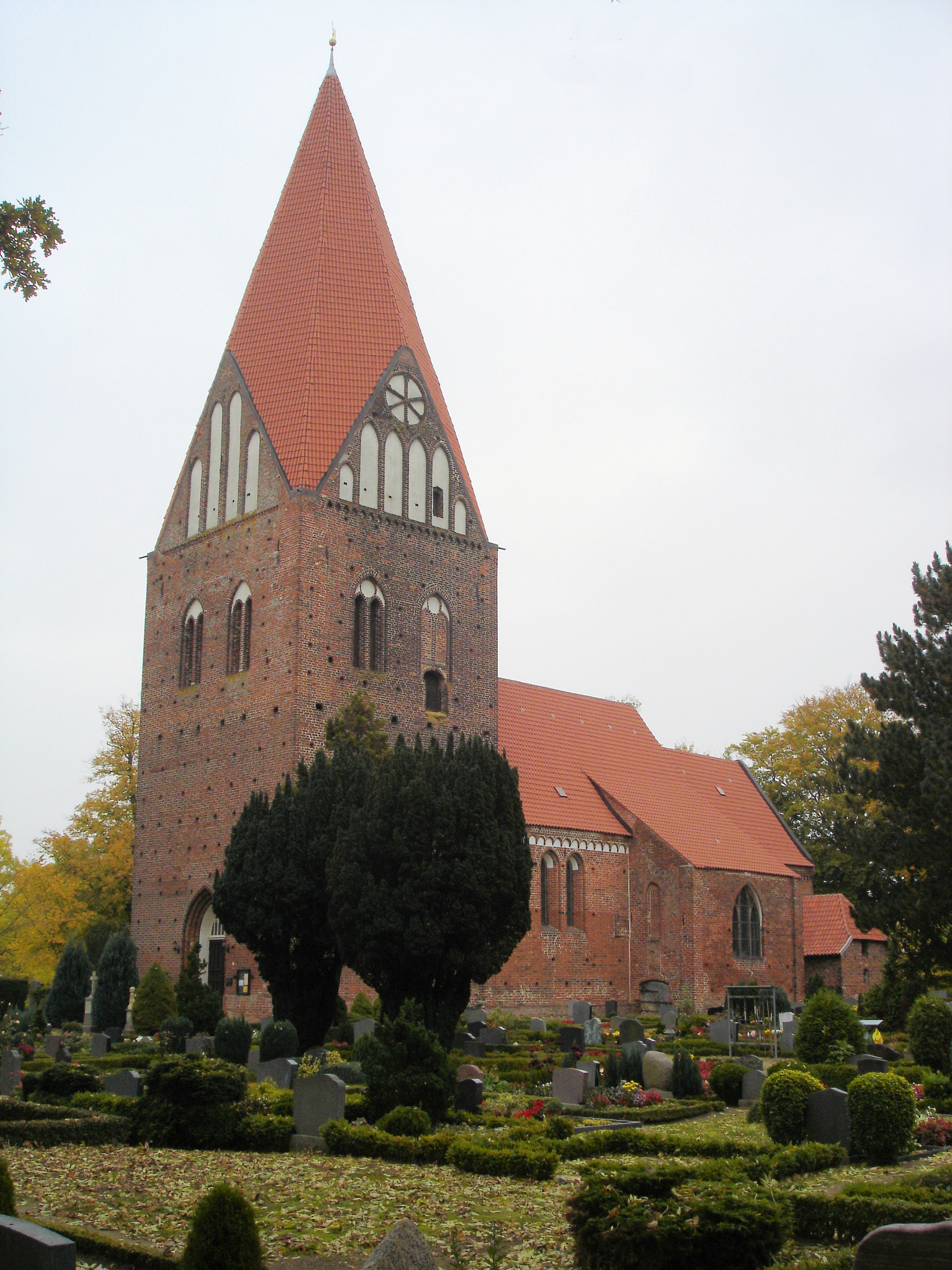
The village church of Proseken

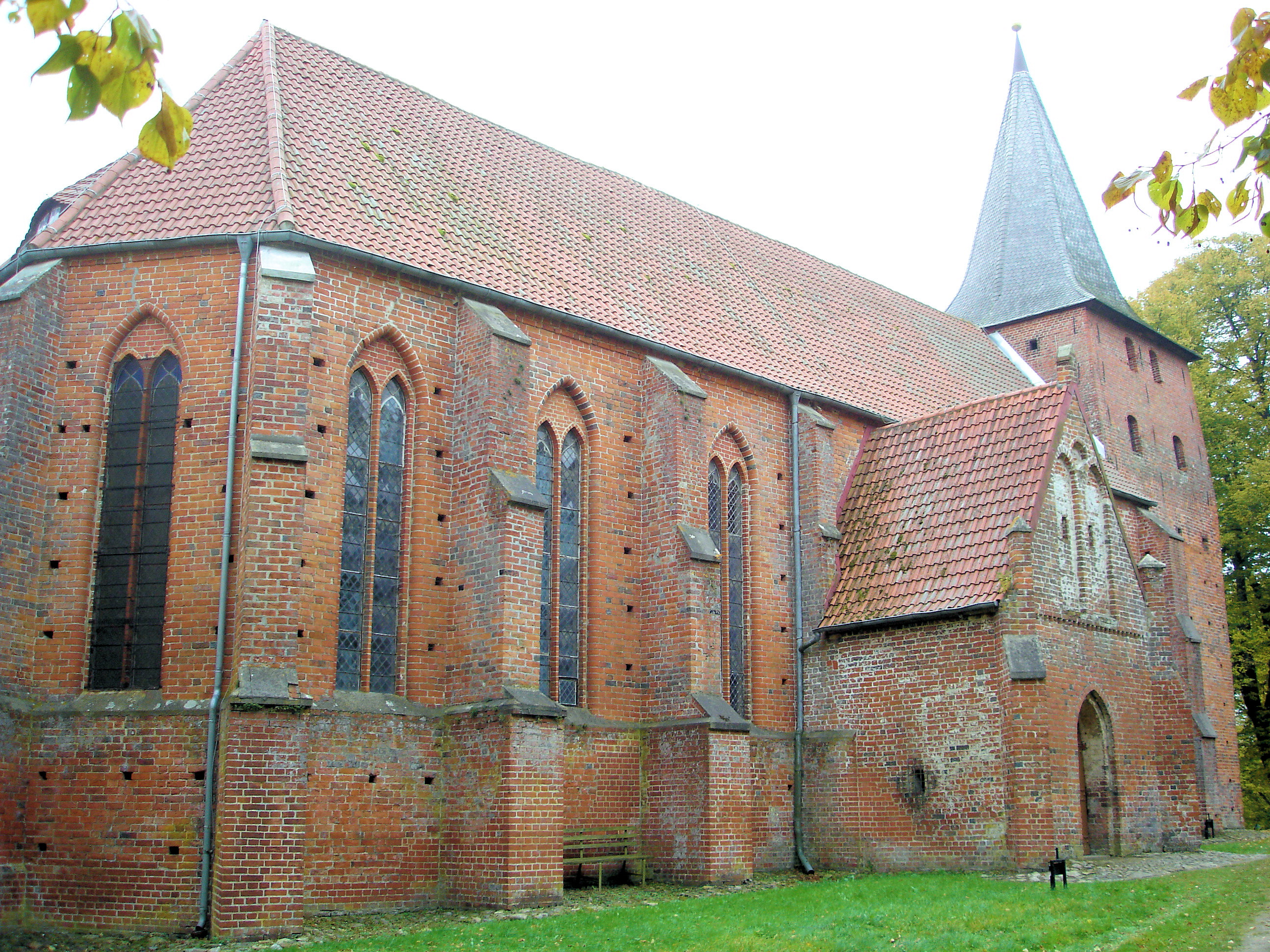
The village church of Gressow
