= Alex Linder =

American white supremacist leader

- Born: June 30, 1966; Madison, Wisconsin, U.S.
- Education: Pomona College
- Occupation: Head of Vanguard News Network
- Website: vanguardnewsnetwork.com

Alex Linder (born June 30, 1966) is an American white supremacist. He was the founder and editor of the Vanguard News Network (VNN), a white supremacist website and forum. Linder was previously a member of the white nationalist group the National Alliance, though later left. He also published a newspaper, The Aryan Alternative.

== Early life ==
Linder was born in Madison, Wisconsin to a German Protestant family, and lived in California and Missouri. He graduated with a bachelor's degree from Pomona College in Claremont, California, in 1988, then worked as a researcher for CNN on the Evans & Novak political show, and then at The American Spectator.

== Political activity ==
In 2000, Linder established Vanguard News Network (VNN), an antisemitic and white supremacist website and forum. In the 2000s, the Anti-Defamation League (ADL) described VNN as then "one of the most active white supremacist sites on the Internet." Linder was a member of the National Alliance (NA), a white nationalist group; the Southern Poverty Law Center described the NA "the country's most active and important neo-Nazi group" in the United States when he joined it. He left after deciding to allow criticism of the National Alliance to appear on the VNN forums.

The Anti-Defamation League (ADL) reported that Linder announced in January 2005 his intention to establish the White Freedom Party, stating it was "America's first political party advocating Aryan interests and specifically naming the Jew as the agent of white genocide and greatest obstacle to our people's self-preservation as a distinct and protected people." It threatened to "WAGE NONSTOP WAR on the Jews, coloreds, and mainstream sellouts".

In May 2007, Linder organized what has been described as a "racially charged protest" linked to the Channon Christian and Christopher Newsom murder case in Knoxville, Tennessee, that attracted 30 supporters, around 60 counterprotesters, and 300 law enforcement officers. Linder fought with police and was the only person arrested. He was charged with disorderly conduct, resisting arrest, vandalism, and assault on a police officer. He was placed on six months probation and ordered to pay restitution to the police officer whom he assaulted.

== The Aryan Alternative ==
In 2004, Linder began to publish a tabloid newspaper called The Aryan Alternative. Four issues were published as of July 2010 – the first issue was published in mid-2004. Printing of the first issue resulted in 41,000 copies being distributed in 28 U.S. states. The most recent issue, July 2010 (#4), was published in mid-2009. The newspaper is distributed for free, but donations for it are solicited online.

In articles which he wrote for The Aryan Alternative newspaper, Linder claims that Jews have been and are consciously engaging in a conspiracy in which they are implementing a systematic program of genocide to exterminate the Aryan race.
