= Jamel, Germany =

Jamel
- Ortsteil of Gägelow
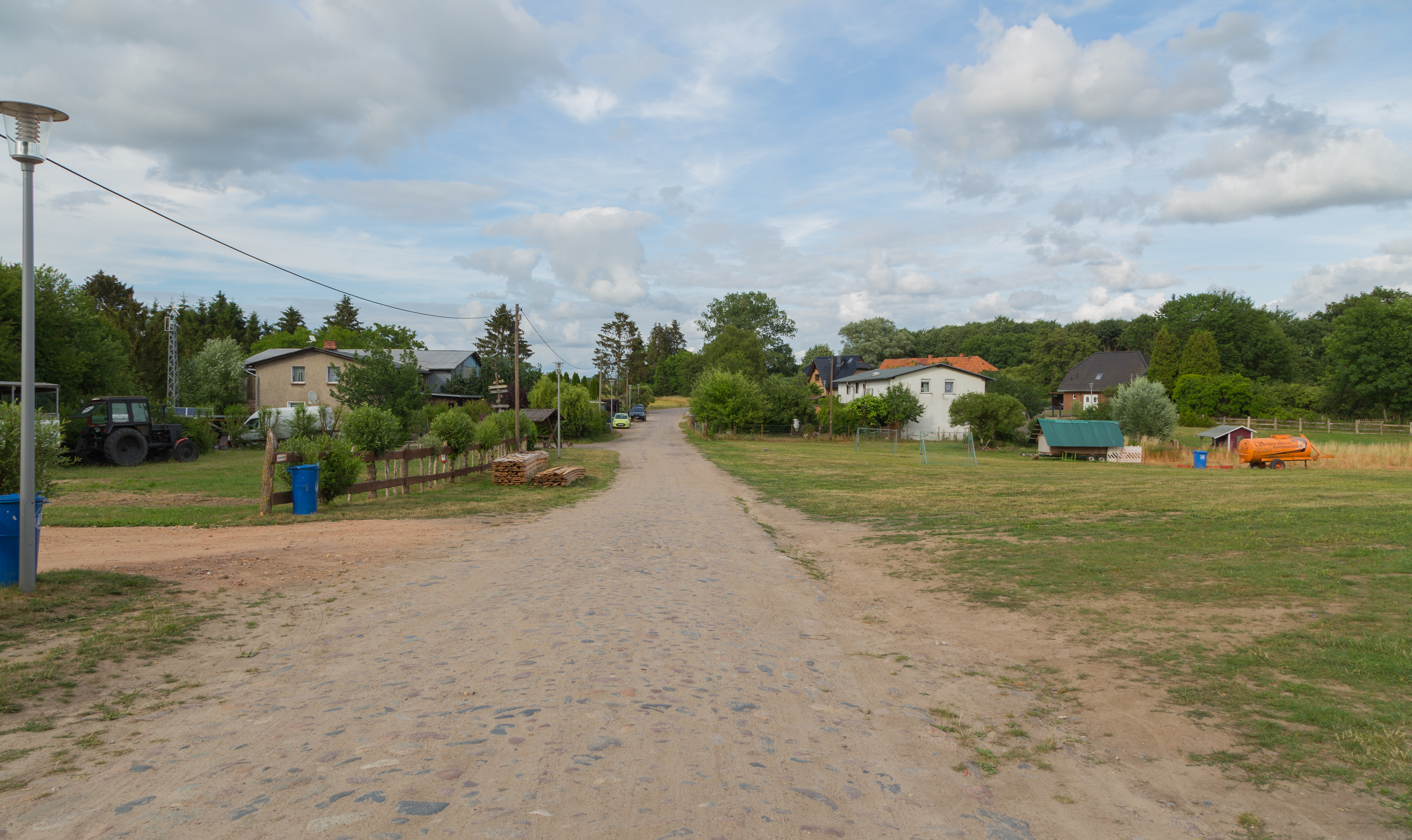
- Forststraße (Forest Street) in 2022

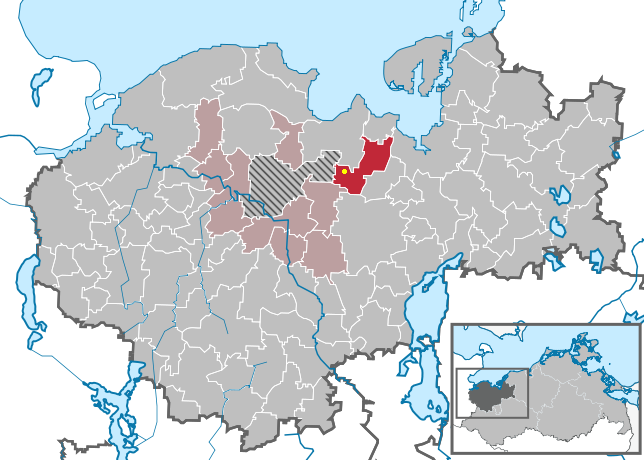
- Location of Jamel (yellow dot) within Gägelow municipality (red) and Nordwestmecklenburg
- Interactive map of Jamel
- Location within Germany Location within Mecklenburg-Vorpommern
- Coordinates: 53°52′24.61″N 11°18′16.18″E
- Country: Germany
- State: Mecklenburg-Vorpommern
- District: Nordwestmecklenburg
- Municipality: Gägelow
- Elevation: 74 m (243 ft)

Population (2010)
  - Total: 35
- Time zone: UTC+01:00 (CET)
  - Summer (DST): UTC+02:00 (CEST)
- Postal codes: 23968
- Dialling codes: 03841
- Vehicle registration: NWM

Jamel is a village in the municipality of Gägelow, in the Nordwestmecklenburg district, Mecklenburg-Vorpommern of northern Germany.

== History ==
According to the Mecklenburgisches Urkundenbuch, the village was first mentioned in 1230 as Jazel. On 1 July 1950, it merged with Wolde, as an autonomous municipality, and the new town of Gressow merged in 1961 into the current municipality of Gägelow.

== Geography ==
Jamel is located at the end of a secondary road departing from the Bundesstraße 105, between Gägelow (7 km (4.3 mi) far, in the east) and Grevesmühlen (11 km (6.8 mi) far in the west). It is 17 km (11 mi) from Wismar, 44 km (27 mi) from Schwerin and 60 km (37 mi) from Lübeck.

== Extremism ==
As of 2011, the village of about 35 people was heavily populated by German neo-Nazis and other far-right extremists who are mostly members or voters of the National Democratic Party of Germany. NPD member Sven Krüger lives there after his release in 2016 from prison for illegal weapon possession. Properties in the village were rented to other NPD sympathizers.

A signpost near the main road pointed to Vienna, Paris, and to the birthplace of Adolf Hitler, Braunau am Inn. In April 2011, the administrative court at Schwerin confirmed the order of the head official of Amt Grevesmühlen-Land, that the sign corresponded to the definition of Volksverhetzung (hate crime) and ordered for it to be removed. As of 2015 the sign was displayed, albeit on private property. There was also a playground with a life rune (the Nordic symbol for fertility and life, commonly used by Neo-Nazis) on a tree trunk.

The Jamel rockt den Förster rock festival to counter extremism has been held since 2017.

== See also ==
- Leith, North Dakota, tiny American town which thwarted an attempted neo-Nazi take over
- Harrison, Arkansas, an American town with a reputation for far-right politics
