= Charlottesville historic monument controversy =

The Charlottesville historic monument controversy is the public discussion on how Charlottesville should respond to protesters who complain that various local monuments are racist. The controversy began before 2016 when protest groups in the community asked the city council for the local removal of Confederate monuments and memorials. Other monuments became part of the controversy, including those of Thomas Jefferson because of his ownership of slaves and those of Lewis and Clark for their advocacy of white colonists over Native Americans.

In 2016, the Charlottesville city council responded by voting to make changes including the removal of some statues and changing the names of some parks. Counterprotesters then filed a lawsuit to keep the statues.

On July 10, 2021, the city removed the statues of Robert E. Lee and Stonewall Jackson.

== History ==
Between 1919 and 1924, businessman and philanthropist Paul Goodloe McIntire financed a set of four public sculptures, George Rogers Clark, Thomas Jonathan Jackson, Robert Edward Lee, and Meriwether Lewis and William Clark, through the National Sculpture Society. The sculptures had themes of white people displacing Native Americans and of celebrating the Lost Cause of the Confederacy.

== Monuments ==
- Thomas Jonathan Jackson
- Robert Edward Lee
- Thomas Jefferson
- Meriwether Lewis and William Clark
- George Rogers Clark
- At Ready, the statue of Johnny Reb
- Court Square Park
- Market Street Park

== Events ==
=== Renaming of parks ===
On 4 June 2017, attorneys representing the descendants of Confederate soldiers opposed the renaming of the parks.

In June 2017, the city council voted to rename the parks. Jackson Park became "Justice Park," and Lee Park became "Emancipation Park."

In July 2018, the city council voted again 4-1 to rename the parks. Emancipation Park became "Market Street Park," and Justice Park became "Court Square Park." City council members voting to change the names said that the idealistic names did not fit if the Confederate statues remained in the park. Also, they reported to have survey results in favor of the new names. The city council member in opposition said that renaming the parks would lead the community to avoid necessary conversation.

=== Payne v. City of Charlottesville ===
Payne v. City of Charlottesville was the lawsuit filed by advocates for preservation of the monuments. The lawsuit paused removal of the statues and argued against various alterations.

=== Unite the Right rally ===
The Unite the Right rally was an event on August 11–12, 2017 in Charlottesville organized in protest of attempts to remove monuments in Charlottesville. The event drew international media attention and included violence that included a death.

== Response ==
In October 2016 a report by city staff in Charlottesville estimated that the cost of removing the statues could be $700,000. At the time this amount of money was large enough to be a factor in making a decision about moving the statues.

In May 2017 Charlottesville Mayor Michael Signer wrote to explain why he, as one of 5 members of city council, voted with the minority in a 3-2 decision to keep the statue in place. He explained that removing the statue would lead to people forgetting the racist history of the community. By keeping the statue in place he hoped that the community could reinterpret it from being a symbol of racial oppression to a memorial for remembering the struggle to overcome oppression.
