= List of memorials to Stonewall Jackson =

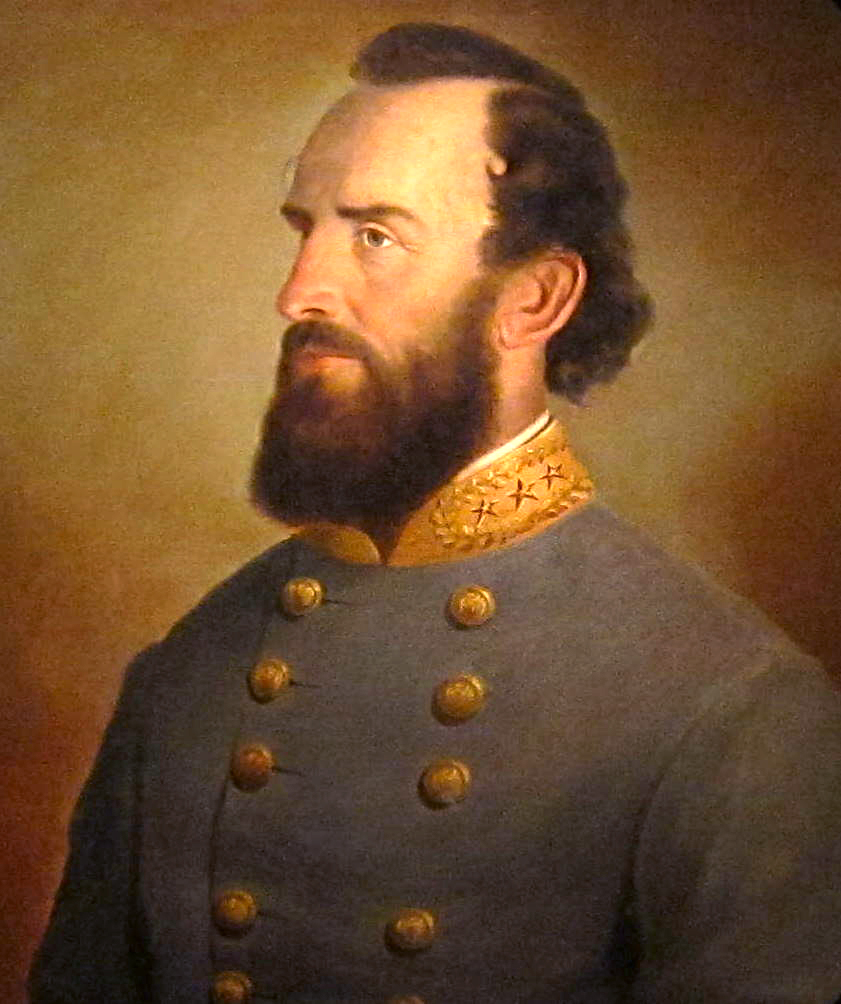
A portrait of Stonewall Jackson (1864, J. W. King) in the National Portrait Gallery

The following is a list of memorials to and things named in honor of Thomas "Stonewall" Jackson (1824–1863), who served as a general in the Confederate States Army during the American Civil War of 1861-1865.

== Buildings and structures ==
- Stonewall Jackson House, Lexington, Virginia. Also called the Dorman-Graham House.
- Jackson Memorial Hall, at Virginia Military Institute. -In the process of being renamed by September.
- Jackson Hall, James Madison University. In the wake of the 2020 George Floyd protests, the JMU student organizations recommended renaming the building. -now Darcus Johnson Hall.
- Several schools with this name - see Stonewall Jackson School. However, most have been renamed.
- There were two hospitals that bear Stonewall Jackson's name, one in Weston, WV and another in Lexington, VA. However, the one in Lexington is now called the Carilion Rockbridge Community Hospital.
- Fort Stonewall, a fort built in Clarke County, Alabama on the Alabama River, was named for Jackson in 1863.

== In sculpture ==
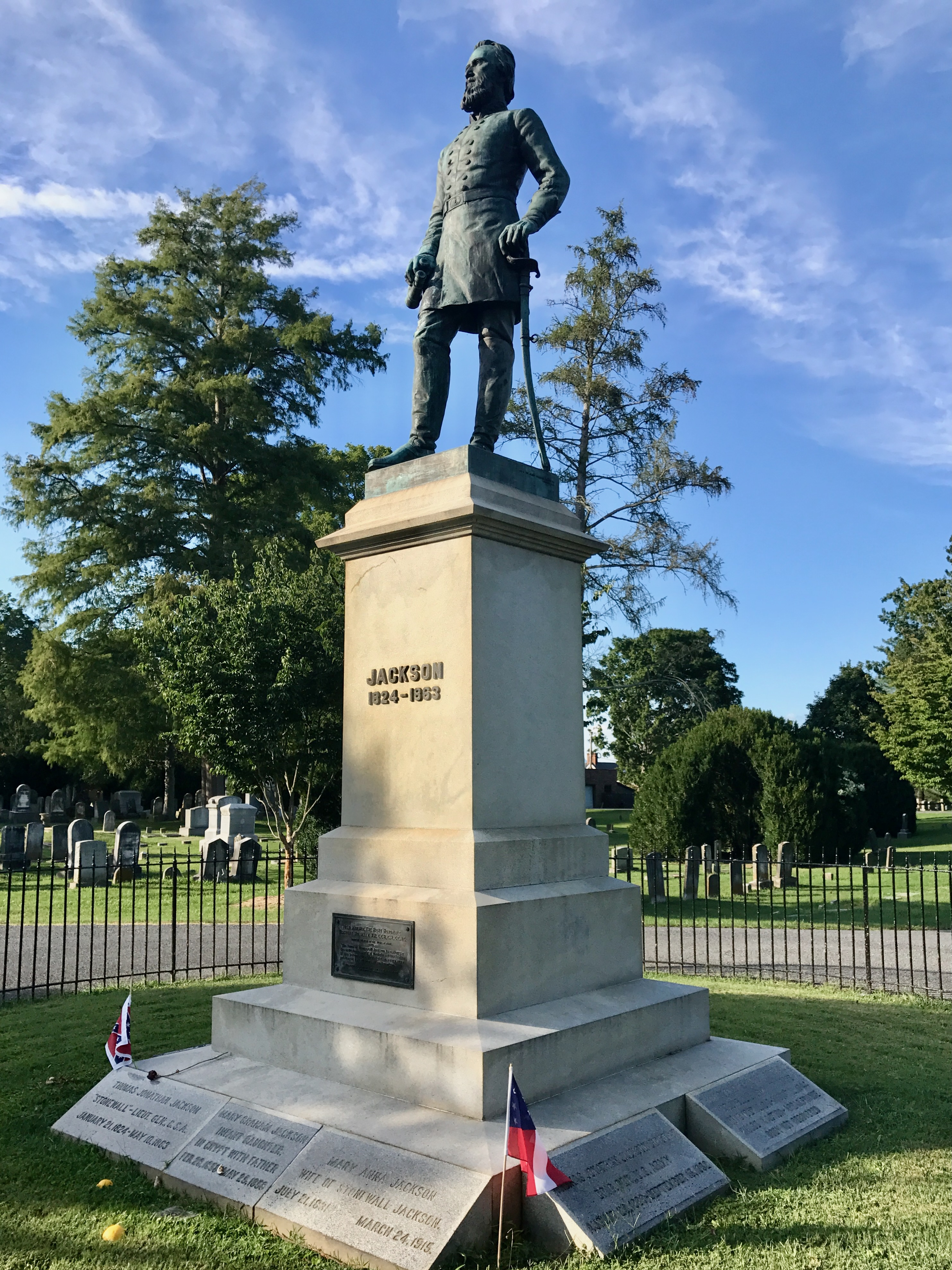
Stonewall Jackson Monument at Oak Grove Cemetery

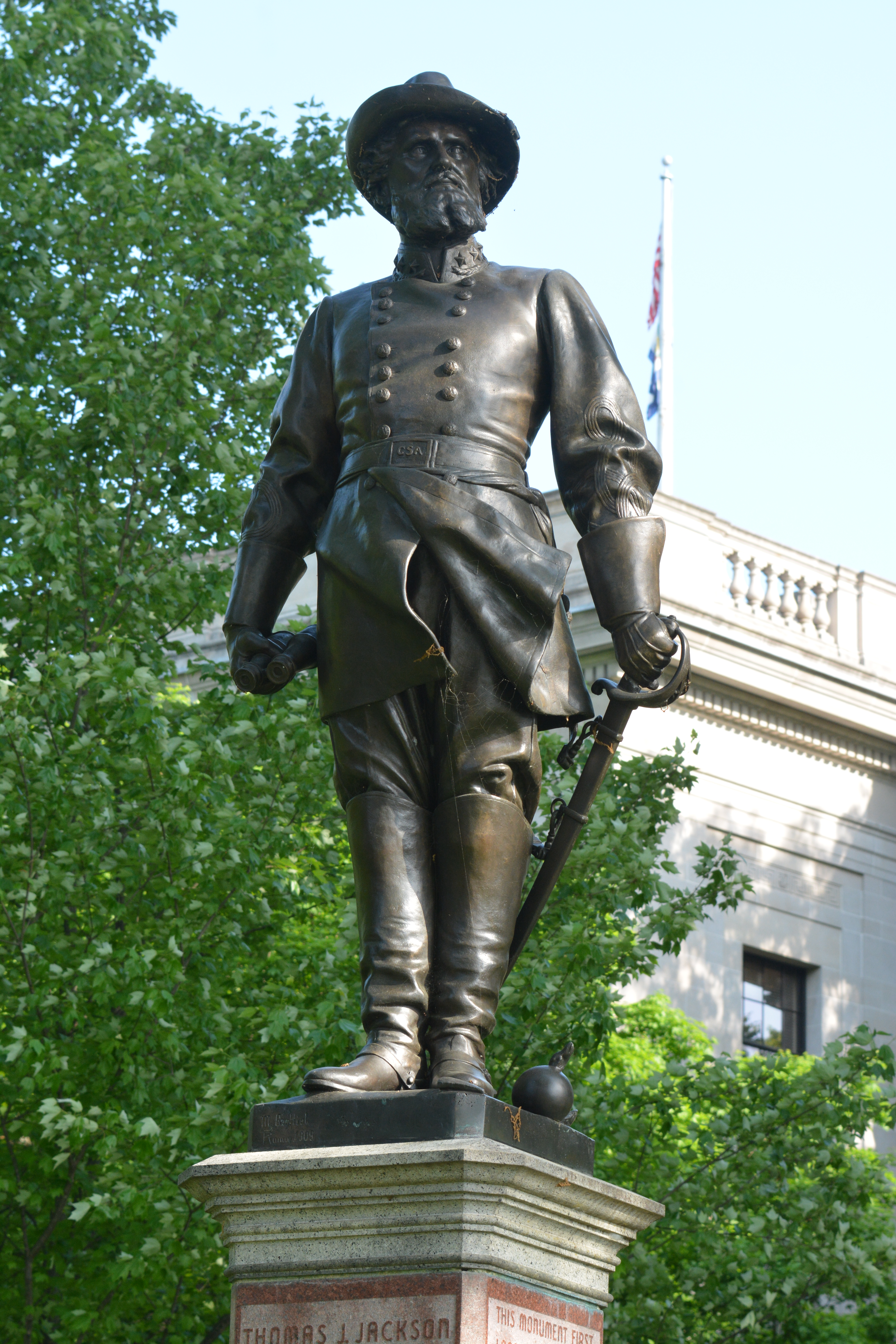
Statue at the West Virginia State Capitol

- Bronze statue of Jackson upon his grave within Oak Grove Cemetery in Lexington, Virginia, sculpted by Edward V. Valentine, dedicated on July 21, 1891.
- In 1900, Jackson was one of the first 29 individuals selected for the Hall of Fame for Great Americans (the first Hall of Fame in the United States), designed by Stanford White, on the Bronx, New York, campus of New York University, now a part of Bronx Community College. However, his bust was removed in August 2017 by order of New York Governor Andrew Cuomo.
- A 1910 bronze statue by Moses Jacob Ezekiel in his native West Virginia on the grounds of the West Virginia State Capitol. A 1912 replica of this statue in bronze can be found at VMI. First-year cadets exiting the barracks through that archway were required to honor Jackson's memory by saluting the statue. The VMI statue has been moved to the New Market Battlefield State Historical Park.

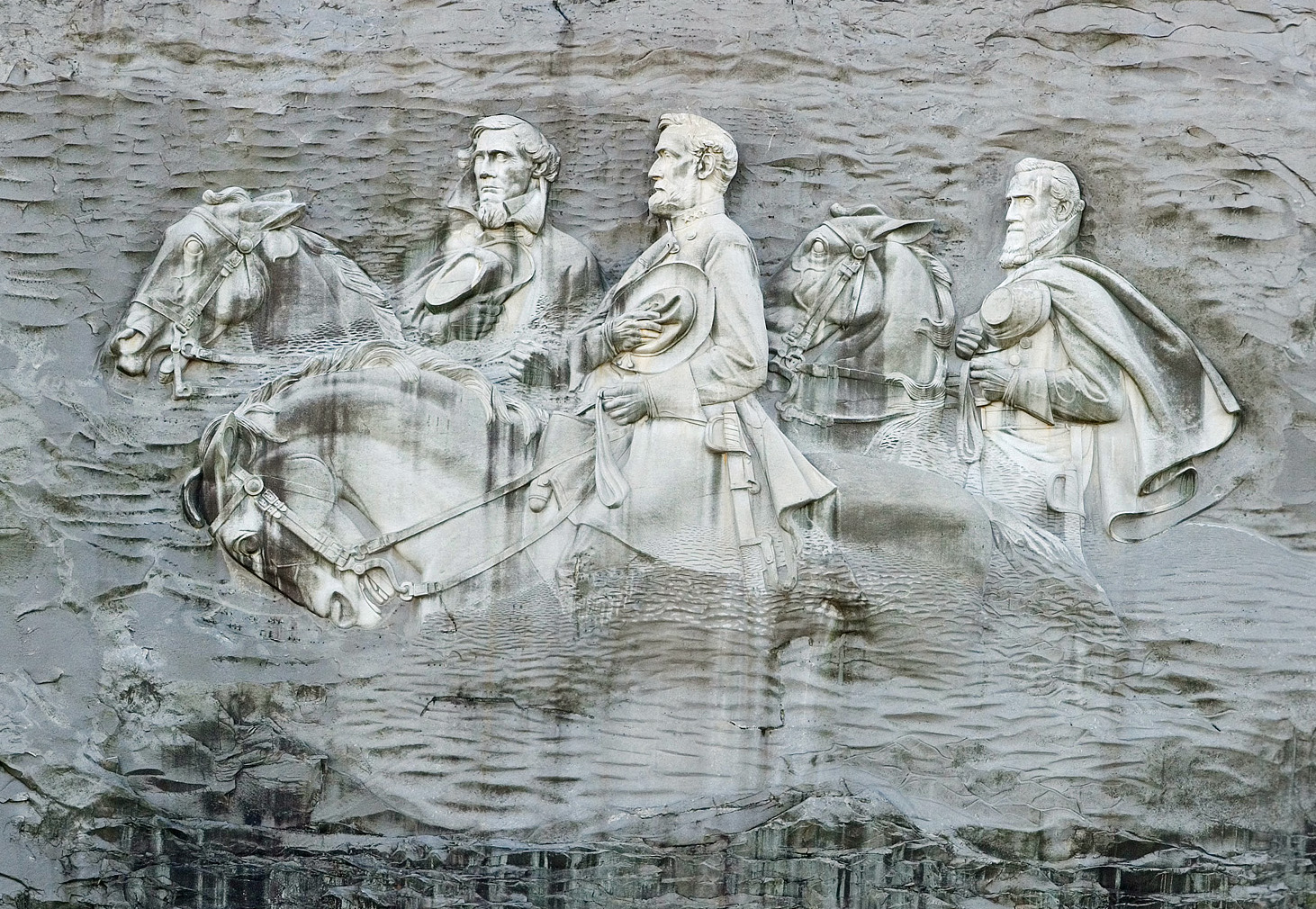
Davis, Lee, and Jackson on Stone Mountain

- He was memorialized on historic Monument Avenue in Richmond, Virginia with an equestrian statue by Frederick William Sievers the Stonewall Jackson Monument; unveiled October 11, 1919 and removed on July 1, 2020.
- A statue of Jackson by John Henry Foley was placed near the Virginia state capitol in 1875.
- The equestrian Thomas Jonathan Jackson by Charles Keck was erected at Charlottesville, Virginia in 1921, and listed on the National Register of Historic Places in 1997. The statue was removed by the city in July 2021, along with The Conquerer of the Northwest and a Robert E. Lee monument. Kara Walker transformed the statue into Unmanned Drone, and Bethany Collins used its granite base for Love is dangerous, both shown in the 2025 Monuments exhibition.
- Another casting of Keck's Jackson statue was dedicated in Clarksburg, West Virginia in 1953.
- Stonewall Jackson Monument by Joseph Pollia, Manassas National Battlefield Park, Manassas, Virginia* Equestrian statue, 1927
- Jackson also appears prominently in the enormous bas-relief carving on the face of Stone Mountain riding with Jefferson Davis and Robert E. Lee. The carving depicts the three on horseback, appearing to ride in a group from right to left across the mountainside. The lower parts of the horses' bodies merge into the mountainside at the foot of the carving. The three riders are shown bare-headed and holding their hats to their chests. It is the largest such carving in the world. The work was begun by Gutzon Borglum in 1924 and continued by Augustus Lukeman, Walker Hancock and others. It was completed in 1972.
- The Confederate Monument in Augusta, Georgia was dedicated in 1878 to the Confederate dead of Richmond County. A statue of Stonewall Jackson is near its base accompanying statues of Generals Robert E. Lee, W. H. T. Walker and T. R. R. Cobb. The designer of the monument was VanGunder and Young of Philadelphia.

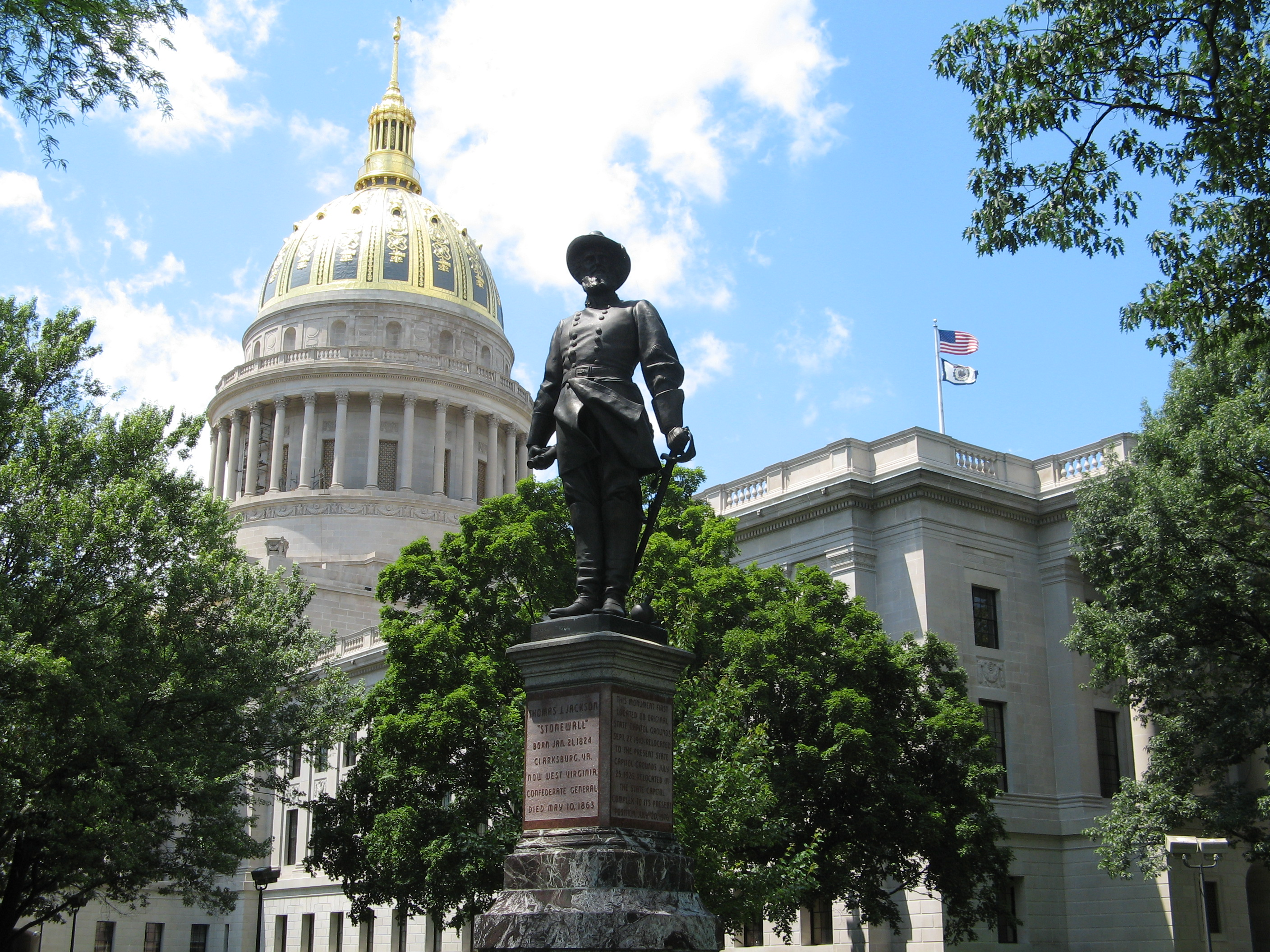
Statue of Jackson on the south lawn of the West Virginia State Capitol

== Film ==
- In the 2003 film Gods and Generals, Jackson is portrayed by Stephen Lang and is the story's main protagonist as adapted from Jeff Shara's historical novel of the same title, ISBN 0-345-40492-0, 1996, Ballantine Books.

== Stage productions ==
- The Theater at Lime Kiln, a local outdoor theater company in Lexington, Virginia, has performed a country-style musical about the life and times of Stonewall Jackson entitled Stonewall Country since 1984.

== Literature ==
- Jackson is featured prominently in the novel and film Gods and Generals. In the film, he is portrayed by Stephen Lang.
- John Dwyer's historical novel Stonewall covers Jackson's entire life, from childhood to death, with particular attention paid to the role his Presbyterian faith played in his life.
- Stonewall Jackson has appeared in a number of alternative history novels. He is the subject of Douglas Lee Gibboney's short novel Stonewall Jackson at Gettysburg, which dwells on Jackson's presence on the outcome of the Gettysburg Campaign. By Force of Arms by Billy Bennett has a similar premise. Jackson also appears in Harry Turtledove's Southern Victory: Volume 1: How Few Remain as the leader of the main army of an independent Confederacy when the United States declares war against it in 1881. Jackson is the protagonist of Stonewall Goes West by R.E. Thomas, where Jackson survives his wounding at Chancellorsville to replace Braxton Bragg at the head of the Army of Tennessee.
- Caspar Vega's 2016 novel Hayfoot is about a Neo-Confederate movie star who attempts to go back in time to save Stonewall so he could be present at Gettysburg.

== On postage ==
Jackson has been commemorated on U.S. postage stamps on three occasions, the first being a commemorative stamp that also honored Robert E. Lee, issued in 1936, the second in 1970, along with Lee again and Jefferson Davis, depicted on horseback on the 6-cent Stone Mountain Memorial commemorative issue, modeled after the actual Stone Mountain Memorial carving in Georgia. The stamp was issued on September 19, 1970, in conjunction with the dedication of the Stone Mountain Confederate Memorial in Georgia on May 9, 1970. A third stamp commemorating Jackson was released in 1995 (copyrighted stamp not shown).

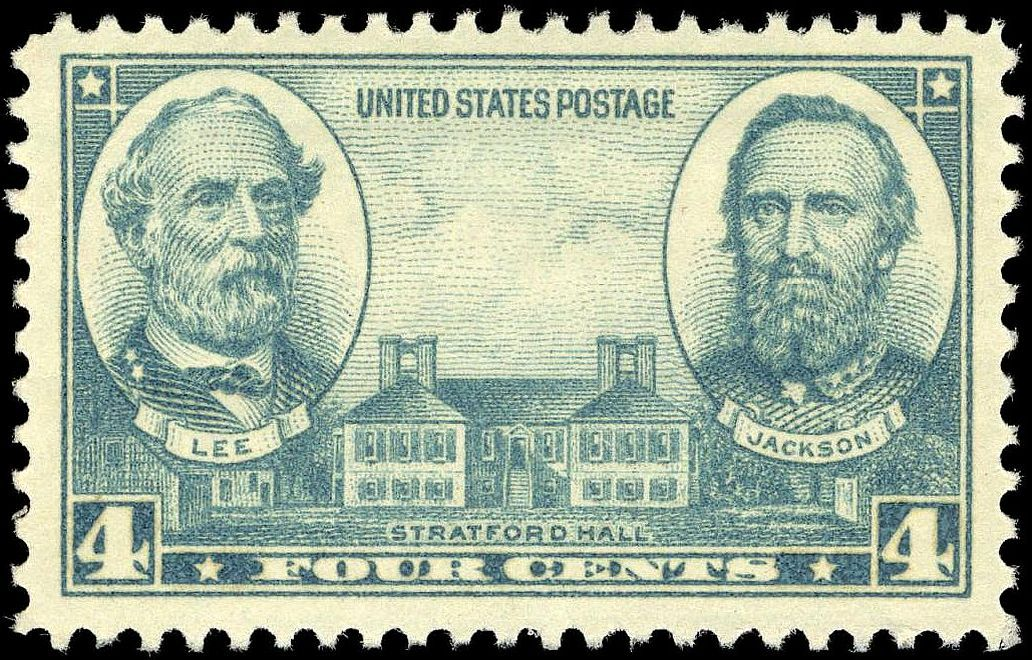
Robert E. Lee, Stonewall Jackson and Stratford Hall, Army Issue of 1936

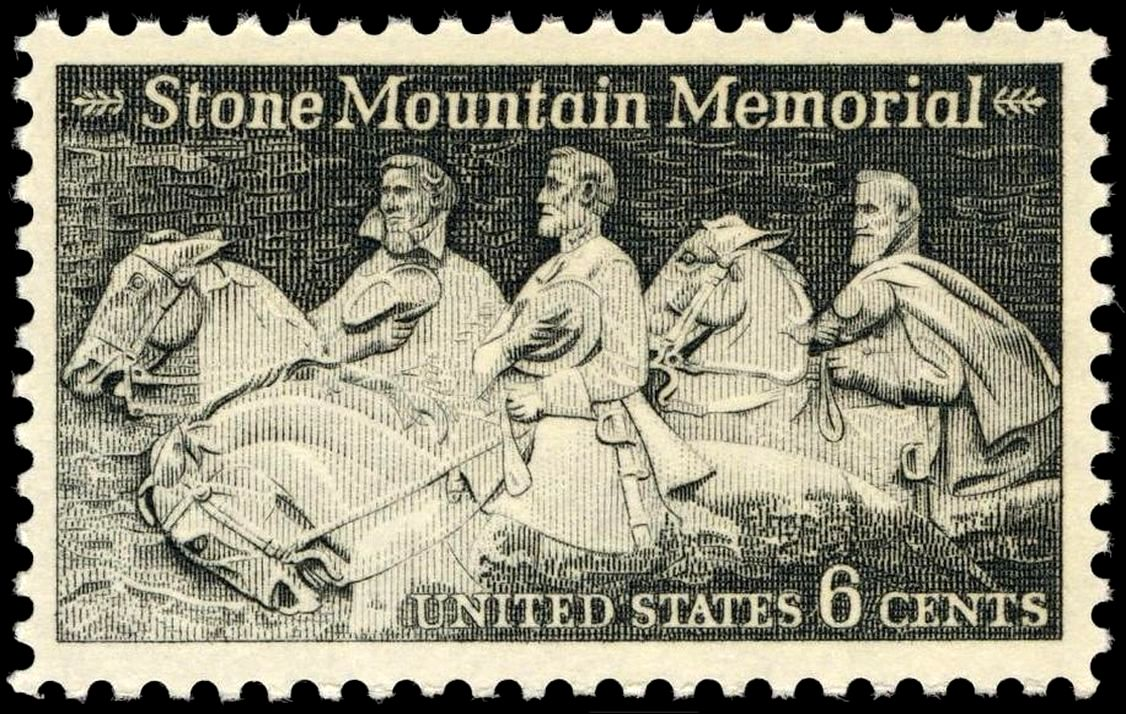
Jefferson Davis, R. E. Lee and Stonewall Jackson. Stone Mountain Issue of 1970

== Other ==
Stonewall Jackson and his family are buried at Oak Grove Cemetery in Lexington, Virginia. It was named after him from 1949 until 2020, when the Lexington City Council unanimously voted to rename the cemetery following the George Floyd protests.

The lineage of Jackson's Confederate Army unit, the Stonewall Brigade, continues to the present day in form of the 116th Infantry Brigade of the U.S. Army, currently part of the Virginia National Guard. The unit's shoulder sleeve insignia worn until 2008 depicted Stonewall Jackson mounted on horseback.

The United States Navy submarine U.S.S. Stonewall Jackson (SSBN 634), commissioned in 1964, was named for him. The words "Strength—Mobility" are emblazoned on the ship's banner, words taken from letters written by General Jackson. It was the third U.S. Navy ship named for him. The submarine was decommissioned in 1995. During World War II, the Navy named a Liberty ship the SS T.J. Jackson in his honor.

The U.S. M36 tank destroyer was nicknamed Jackson after him by British forces in World War II.

"Stonewall" Jackson appeared on the CSA $500 bill (7th Issue, February 17, 1864) and on the 1925 Stone Mountain Memorial half dollar.

The towns of Stonewall in Virginia, North Carolina, Alabama, Mississippi, Louisiana, Oklahoma, Texas and Kentucky are named in his honor, as are Jackson County in Oklahoma and Stonewall County in Texas.

The Stonewall Jackson Area Council of the Boy Scouts of America in central Virginia is named in his honor.
