= Monuments (exhibition) =

Contemporary art exhibition (2025-2026)

- Date: October 23, 2025 – May 3, 2026
- Venue: Museum of Contemporary Art, Los Angeles and The Brick
- Location: Los Angeles
- Theme: Contemporary art; Confederate monuments and memorials
- Curators: Hamza Walker, Bennett Simpson, and Kara Walker

Monuments (stylized in all caps) was an art exhibition organized by the nonprofit gallery The Brick and the Museum of Contemporary Art, Los Angeles in 2025. The exhibition explored the removal of Confederate monuments and memorials in the United States, as well as the impact of monuments on American life.

First proposed by Hamza Walker, the director of The Brick (formerly known as LAXART), the exhibition included several decommissioned or altered Confederate monuments and memorials and other removed sculptures of white supremacist and racist figures from across the United States, presented alongside newly commissioned works responding to the monuments and recent works by other contemporary artists. The curators borrowed or purchased decommissioned monuments from a range of municipalities and organizations, many of which were removed in the late 2010s and early 2020s.

The exhibition received broad critical acclaim and was hailed by several writers as the most important art exhibition of the year.

== Background and history ==
=== Origin and development ===
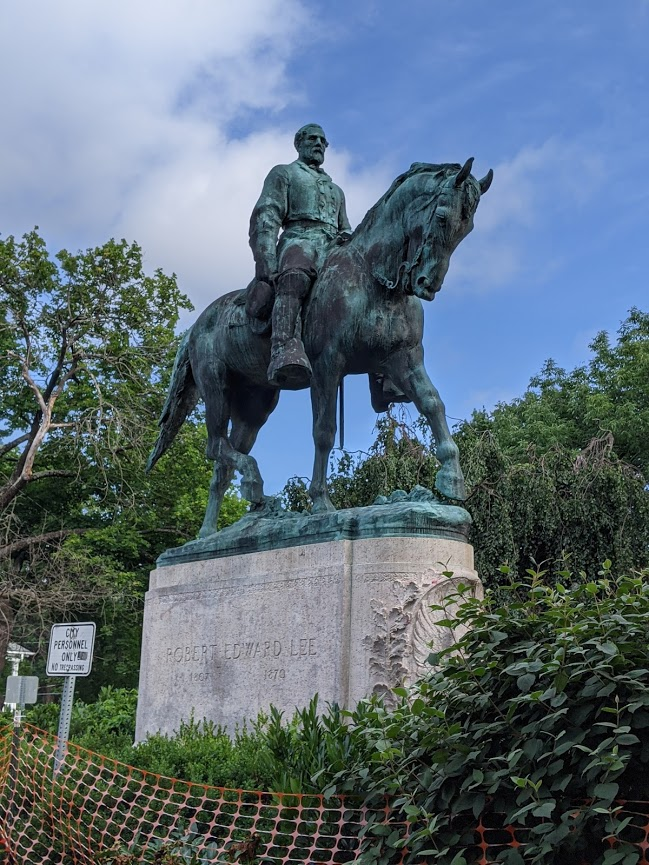
The monument to Robert E. Lee in Charlottesville, Virginia, prior to its removal.

Starting in the mid-2010s, more municipalities and organizations began seeking to dismantle or remove Confederate monuments and memorials in public spaces across the United States, often after public pressure in the wake of acts of racist violence like the Charleston church shooting in 2015. Following the Charleston shootings, the city council of Charlottesville, Virginia, voted to remove several Confederate statues, including its monument of Robert E. Lee. The white supremacist Unite the Right rally was organized in 2017 in response to the planned removal in Charlottesville, which sparked a new wave of Confederate monument decommissioning throughout the United States. In 2020, following the murder of George Floyd and the global protests that ensued, an even larger group of monuments were removed from municipalities across the country.

Curator Hamza Walker moved to Los Angeles to become the director of the nonprofit art organization LAXART in late 2016, the year following the Charleston shooting and shortly after the 2016 United States presidential election. He began developing concepts for an exhibition responding to the removal of monuments and sculptures, quickly inviting artist Kara Walker to participate in the exhibition and join as a co-curator. He also secured seed funding from the Emily Hall Tremaine Foundation to support the project. Walker approached the Museum of Contemporary Art, Los Angeles (MOCA) in 2019, which agreed to join as a partner for the exhibition. MOCA curator Bennett Simpson joined the project as a co-curator.

=== Loan and acquisition process ===
The exhibition curators wrote proposals to a wide range of municipalities and institutions to request loan offers for the show of removed Confederate or racist sculptures. Several cities and organizations had not yet formally decided the long-term fate of their decommissioned sculptures.

The city of Baltimore accepted loan requests from LAXART for several decommissioned Confederate statues which had been removed from public view in 2017. After public reporting in December 2021 on the planned exhibition and Baltimore's approval of loan requests for sculptures, the city reversed its stance and denied the requests. The city later reversed its position again, agreeing to send the sculptures to the exhibition, which were shipped in late 2023.

In December 2021, the Charlottesville city council chose the exhibition organizers as a winning bidder in the competition to purchase a decommissioned statue of Confederate general Stonewall Jackson, one of the monuments at the center of the Unite the Right rally.

The history museum The Valentine and the Black History Museum and Cultural Center of Virginia, both in Richmond, Virginia, announced loan agreements for the exhibition in 2022. The Valentine loaned a sculpture of Confederate President Jefferson Davis, and the Black History Museum loaned several other Confederate statues, all of which had been taken down from public spaces in Richmond in 2020.

Several of the loaned and acquired monuments required specialized heavy-duty equipment to transport to Los Angeles for the exhibition and necessitated road closures along their routes for safety due to their size and weight.

=== Logistics delays, exhibition opening ===
Hamza Walker first formally announced the exhibition on a podcast in December 2021, with a planned opening date of 2023. In March 2023, the curators postponed the exhibition until 2025. Delays were largely due to logistics issues and security concerns which required additional safety measures and more security guards for the galleries. The exhibition's final opening date of October 2025 was announced in May 2024. LAXART was also renamed The Brick in May 2024 upon moving to a new, permanent exhibition space.

Monuments opened to the public at MOCA and The Brick on October 23, 2025, and closed May 3, 2026.

== Artists and art ==
=== Historical works ===
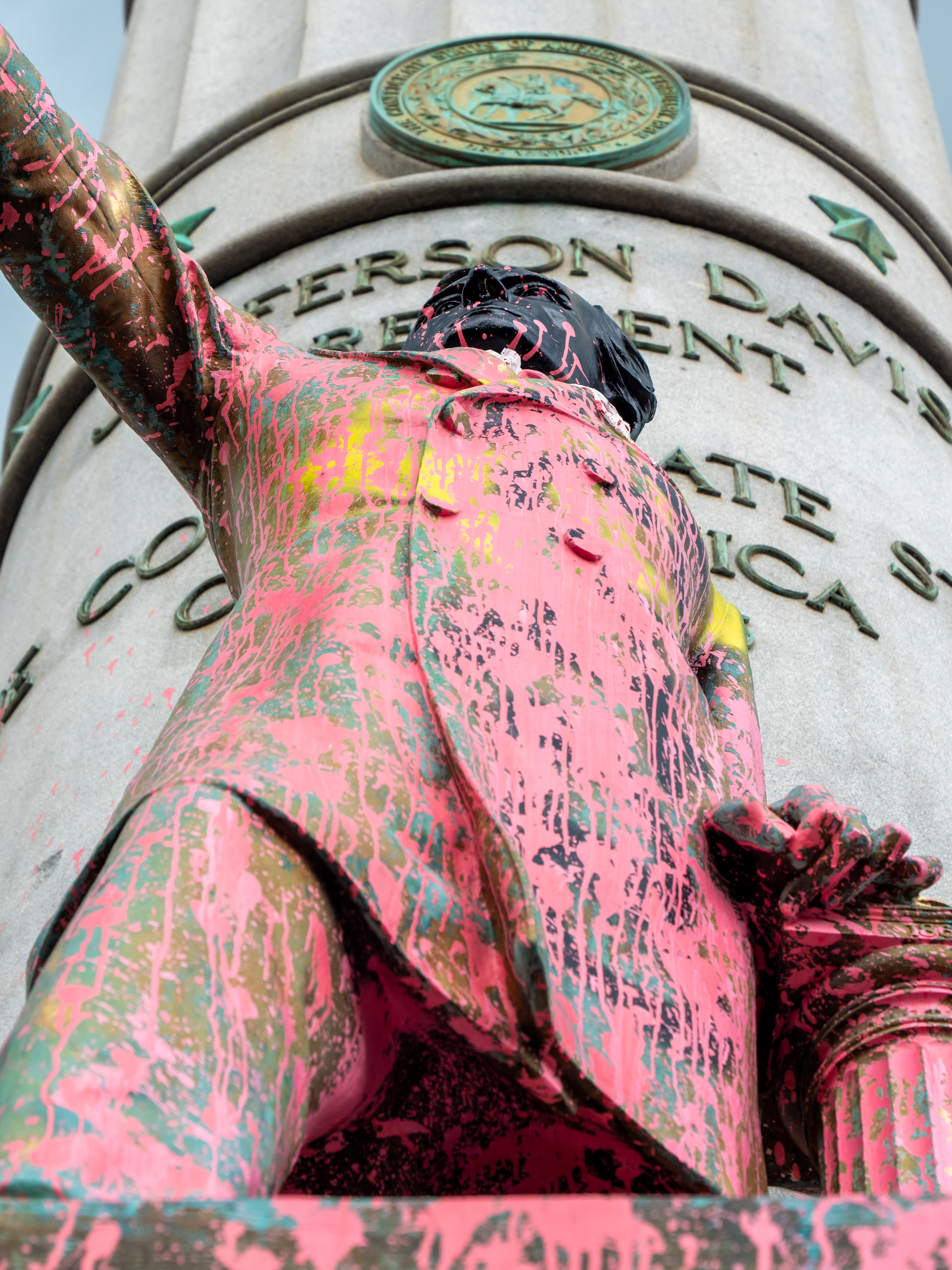
The graffitied Jefferson Davis Memorial in Richmond, Virginia, prior to its removal.

After securing loans from a range of municipalities, organizations, and private owners, the curators presented ten Confederate statues and other monuments to white supremacist or racist figures from American history.

The exhibition included the remnants of the monument of Robert E. Lee from Charlottesville, melted down into bronze ingot bricks for a project organized by the Jefferson School African American Heritage Center, which bought the decommissioned sculpture from the city in 2021. The project organizers plan to use the melted material to commission a new monument in Charlottesville. The exhibition also included the granite base of the Lee statue, which had been spray painted by protesters to read "As white supremacy crumbles". The curators also presented Charlottesville's Stonewall Jackson statue, as altered and retitled by Kara Walker.

Several elements of the Jefferson Davis Memorial from Richmond were shown in the exhibition, including the statue of Davis, which had been toppled and graffitied in 2020, and the sculpture from the top of the memorial known as Vindicatrix or Miss Confederacy. Also from Richmond, the decommissioned Matthew Fontaine Maury Monument and its sculptural elements, including a large globe, were included in the show.

The exhibition included a sculpture of Josephus Daniels, a white supremacist and segregationist newspaper owner from North Carolina who helped incite the Wilmington massacre in 1898. The sculpture had been lent to the show by his descendants following their removal of the work from public view in 2020.

Three decommissioned works from Baltimore were shown in the exhibition: the Roger B. Taney Monument, commemorating the Supreme Court Justice who wrote the court's decision in Dred Scott v. Sandford; the Confederate Women's Monument; and the Stonewall Jackson and Robert E. Lee Monument. All three works had been originally removed from public view in 2017.

The Battle of Liberty Place Monument from New Orleans, commemorating an attempted white supremacist insurrection, was also included in the show.

Beyond Confederate or white supremacist sculptures, the curators also included historical photographs from 1910 by Hugh Mangum, a photographer who owned a racially integrated photography studio in North Carolina during the Jim Crow era.

=== Contemporary works ===
The curators commissioned new work from 12 artists and groups: Bethany Collins, Karon Davis, Abigail DeVille, Stan Douglas, Kevin Jerome Everson, Kahlil Robert Irving, Walter Price, Cauleen Smith, and Kara Walker; Julie Dash and Davóne Tines in collaboration; and the nonprofit Monument Lab. They also borrowed several contemporary works from private and public collections, including works by Leonardo Drew, Torkwase Dyson, Nona Faustine, Jon Henry, Martin Puryear, Andres Serrano, and Hank Willis Thomas.

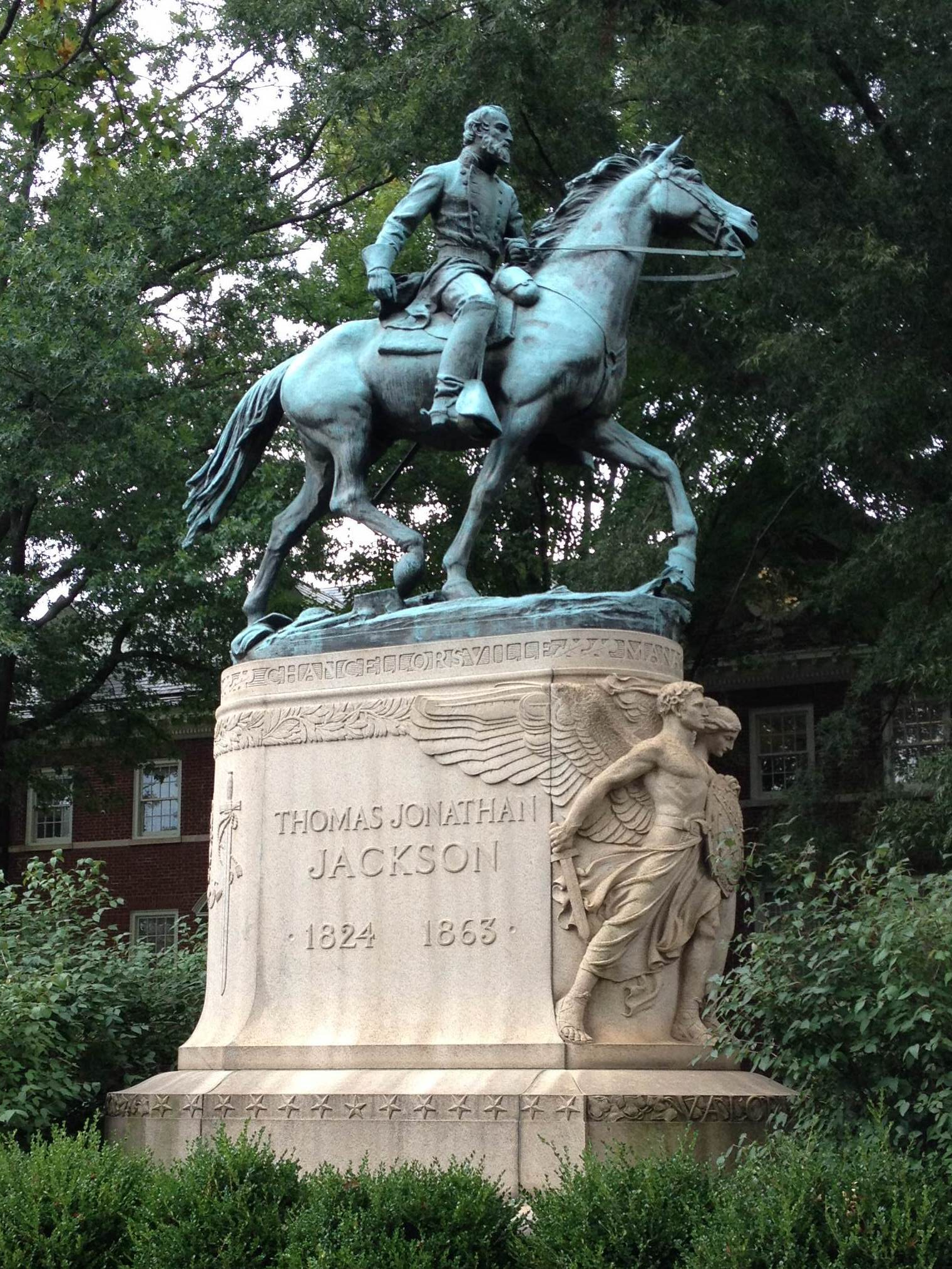
The monument to Stonewall Jackson from Charlottesville, Virginia, which artist Kara Walker used to create a new sculpture.

Kara Walker used the equestrian statue of Stonewall Jackson from Charlottesville to create a new sculpture. She disassembled the horse and rider figures and reattached the limbs and other elements at new angles, titling the new sculpture Unmanned Drone. Her sculpture was the sole artwork shown at The Brick; all other works were exhibited at MOCA. Bethany Collins used portions of the granite base from the Jackson monument to create 100 small Carolina rose petal sculptures for the exhibition.

Cauleen Smith created an installation using the Vindicatrix statue from Baltimore, positioning a CCTV camera to film the decommissioned sculpture. St. Louis-based artist Kahlil Robert Irving created a bronze reproduction of the streets of Ferguson, Missouri, the site of protests in 2014 following the killing of Michael Brown by local police. Filmmaker Julie Dash collaborated with opera singer Davóne Tines to create Homegoing, a film set in the Emanuel African Methodist Episcopal Church, the site of the 2015 Charleston shooting. Inspired by the burning of Richmond by withdrawing Confederate troops at the end of the Civil War, Abigail DeVille created a gallery-sized installation of burnt colonial style furniture.

Canadian artist Stan Douglas exhibited a new, five-screen version of a scene from the 1915 film The Birth of a Nation which depicts a white woman jumping off a cliff to her death to avoid the advancements of a black man (originally played by a white man in blackface). Douglas reshot the scene from the perspectives of several characters. Sculptor Karon Davis created a new sculpture of her son holding a small Confederate toy soldier by the tail of the soldier's horse, similar to artist Charles Ray's sculpture Boy with Frog. Walter Price showed a series of abstract paintings made by walking back and forth across the canvases to create compositions, developed in response to the monument of Maury from Richmond. Kevin Jerome Everson created a filmed portrait of Richard Bradley, an activist who had dressed in a Union army uniform to climb a flagpole and remove a Confederate battle flag displayed at San Francisco City Hall in 1984. Monument Lab was commissioned to create a video work quantifying the various purposes and locations of public monuments in America, building on the organization's public audit of American monuments.

Photographer Jon Henry presented a series of photographs of black women cradling their children in a pose similar to Michelangelo's Pietà, also mirroring the pose from the Confederate Women's Monument from Baltimore. The curators displayed Martin Puryear's mixed media abstract sculpture Tabernacle, shaped similarly to hats worn by soldiers in the Civil War. Torkwase Dyson's sculpture Rate of Transformation, Distance, made of several large black trapezoidal prisms, was also included in the show.

Leonardo Drew exhibited a 900 lb (410 kg) minimalist sculpture made of cotton bales. Hank Willis Thomas displayed a sculpture from 2019 depicting the General Lee - a car from the television series The Dukes of Hazzard featuring a Confederate battle flag - embedded vertically in the ground. The curators included several photographs by artist Nona Faustine created before her death, all from her series of nude self-portraits at historical sites of slave trading in New York City. They also showed several photographs by Andres Serrano from 1990 depicting members of the Ku Klux Klan.

== Reception ==
In the Los Angeles Times, critic Christopher Knight called the show "the most significant" exhibition in America at the time, while Jason Farago of The New York Times called it the "most audacious and contentious" exhibition of the year. In a review for Artillery magazine, Wyatt Coday wrote that the show contained elements rare in contemporary art: "righteousness, heartfelt inquiry, and a loud, expansive reckoning with art's relationship to power."

A number of writers remarked on the visual power of seeing the decommissioned monuments out of their original settings. In a five-star review for Time Out, critic Michael Juliano called the physicality of the intact monuments "awe-inspiring in the most dreadful meaning of the phrase". Farago argued that the placement of the massive monuments in an indoor space essentially neutralized their power, as they appeared incongruous placed inside, directly on the ground. Critic Alex Kitnick wrote for 4Columns that the show's ability to de- and re-contextualize the Confederate monuments represented a critical power of museums.

In The Brooklyn Rail, William Corwin praised the sculptures of Kara Walker and Torkwase Dyson as representing the "most effective" response to Confederate monuments because they used "blunt and total rejection", but he wrote that many of the other works in the show were unsuccessful because of their attempts to use critical logic or humor to disarm evil and hatred. Similarly, Terence Trouillout criticized the show in Frieze for feeling bifurcated between politics and formalism, though he described the exhibition as a "significant curatorial achievement" in spite of its flaws. In an extremely negative review published for Fox News, writer David Marcus called the exhibition a middle finger to the American right.

Reviewing the exhibition for Hyperallergic, Claudia Ross praised the curators for successfully avoiding inadvertently lionizing Confederate imagery with the display of the monuments, and for not ignoring continuing legacies of slavery and racism. Jori Finkel, in a five-star review for The Art Newspaper, similarly lauded the curatorial approach for its flexibility in how artists responded to the monuments and for the choice to only have one artist - Kara Walker - so directly disassemble an entire monument. Several critics called Walker's sculpture the highlight or most important work of the exhibition.

ARTnews named Monuments the best thematic museum exhibition of 2026 at the ARTnews Awards.
