= Statue of Thomas Jefferson (University of Virginia) =

Sculpture by Moses Jacob Ezekiel

Coordinates: 38°02′10″N 78°30′11″W

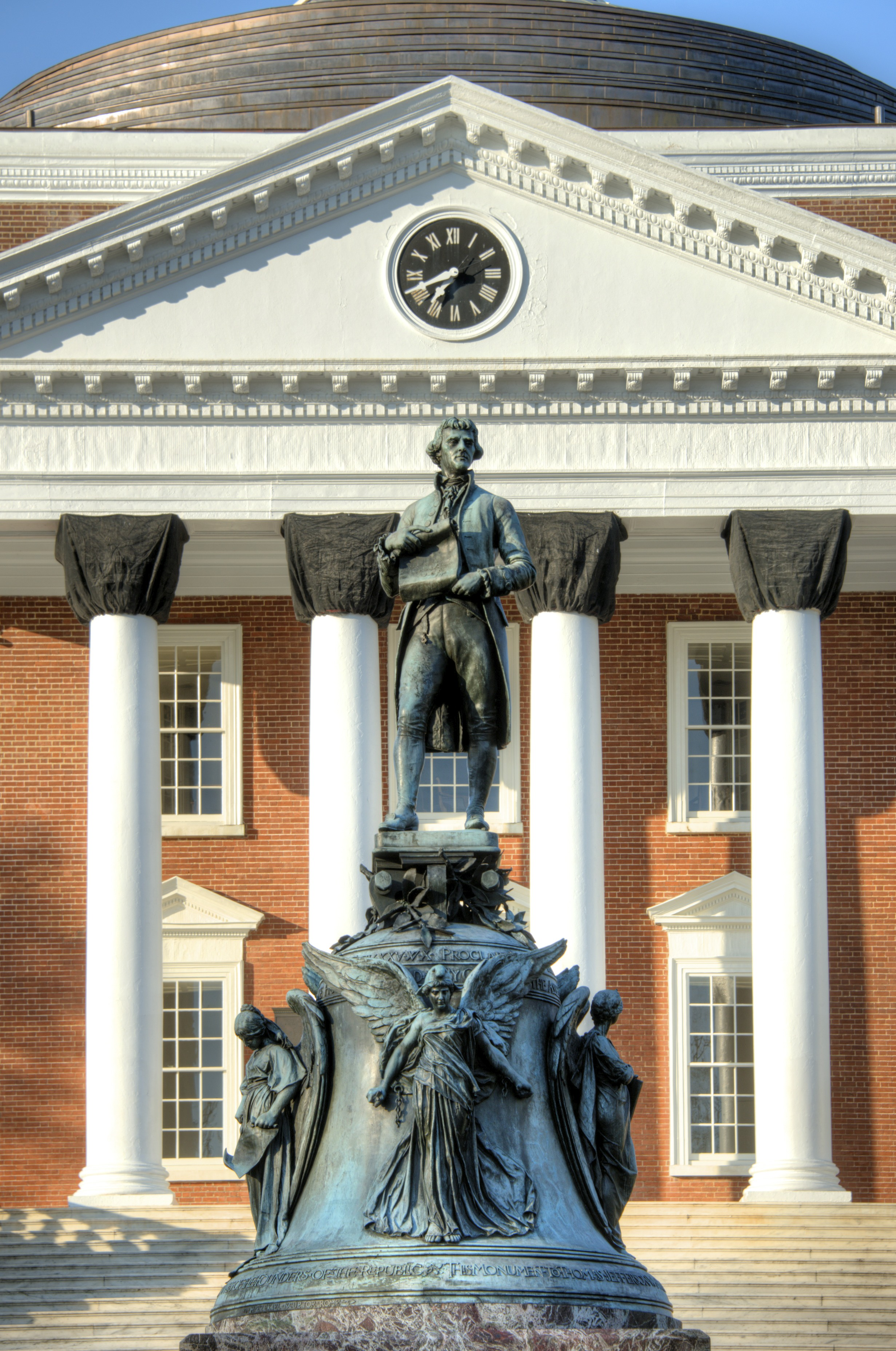
The sculpture in 2014

Thomas Jefferson is a statue of Founding Father and third United States president, Thomas Jefferson, in front of the Rotunda at the University of Virginia, the university he founded and designed. The statue was crafted by Moses Ezekiel in 1910 and is a copy of the Jefferson Monument in Louisville, Kentucky.

== History ==
=== 20th century ===
The statue of Thomas Jefferson was dedicated on June 15, 1910 in front of the Rotunda at the University of Virginia. Designed by sculptor Moses Ezekiel in 1897, and cast in 1898, the statue portrays Jefferson standing on top of a replicate of the Liberty Bell, surrounded by four winged allegorical figures--at the front is Liberty, at the back is Justice, on Jefferson's proper right is Human Freedom, and on Jefferson's proper left is Religious Freedom. Religious Freedom holds a tablet, and Jefferson holds a scroll which represents the United States Declaration of Independence.

=== 21st century ===
In August 2017 the statue was the target of graffiti vandalism.

In September 2017, the statue was the target of protest in the context of the Charlottesville historic monument controversy and the recent 2017 Unite the Right rally. They covered the statue of Jefferson in a way similar to how the city had recently covered the Stonewall Jackson and Robert E. Lee sculptures as well. After the protesters dispersed, one counter-protester arrived carrying a gun, who the police eventually arrested for public intoxication. University of Virginia president Teresa A. Sullivan later responded by calling for civil discourse.

== See also ==
- List of statues of Thomas Jefferson
- List of sculptures of presidents of the United States
