= Walter Price (artist) =

American artist (born 1989)

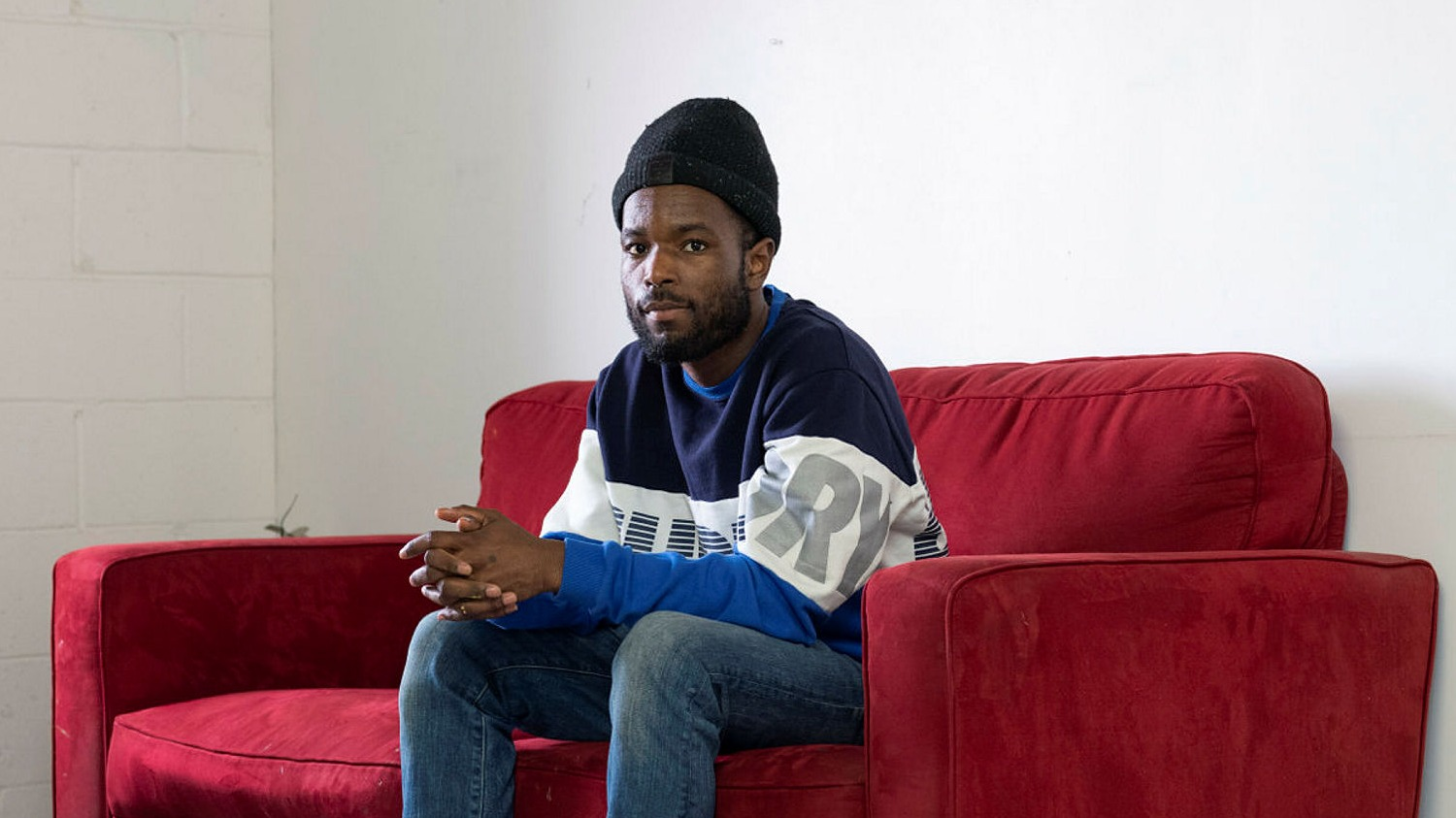
- Born: 1989 (age 36–37); Macon, Georgia, United States
- Education: Middle Georgia College; AA, 2012–14; The Art Institute of Washington; BA, 2011

Walter Price (born 1989) is an American painter based in New York City. He is represented by Greene Naftali, David Zwirner, and The Modern Institute.

== Early life ==
Born and raised in Macon, Georgia, United States, Walter Price decided to become an artist in elementary school. After he saw a photo of artist Jacob Lawrence wearing a sailor's uniform and standing next to one of his paintings, Price decided to enlist in the U.S. Navy. He served four years in the navy aboard the USS Whidbey Island. His military service enabled him to pursue his art education on the GI Bill.

== Career ==
Price's artistic practice often involves materials beyond acrylic or vinyl paint, as he incorporates fabric and photographs into his works. The paintings, often on wood panel, embody compositions that blur the line between abstraction and figuration.

== Exhibitions ==
=== Group exhibitions ===
- 2013 – Full Spectrum, Harriet Tubman Museum, Macon, Georgia
- 2016 – Hill of Munch, Rachel Uffner Gallery, New York, NY
- 2016 – No Free Tax Art Month, 247365, New York, NY
- 2017 – Mondialité (curated by Hans Ulrich Obrist and Asad Raza), Boghossian Foundation – Villa Empain, Brussels
- 2017 – 99 Cents or Less, Museum of Contemporary Art Detroit, Detroit, MI
- 2017 – Fictions, The Studio Museum Harlem, New York, NY
- 2017 – 99 Cents or Less, curated by Jens Hoffmann, Museum of Contemporary Art Detroit
- 2017 – 89plus: Americans 2017, LUMA Foundation
- 2017 – Zeitgeist, curated by Paul Bernard, Lionel Bovier, and Fabrice Stroun, MAMCO – Musée d’art moderne et contemporain
- 2018 – FRONT International: Cleveland Triennial for Contemporary Art, Cleveland, Ohio
- 2019 – Techniques of the Observer, Greene Naftali, New York, NY
- 2019 Whitney Biennial, Whitney Museum of American Art, curated by Rujeko Hockley and Jane Panetta
- 2020 – 100 Drawings From Now, The Drawing Center
- 2021 – Ways of Seeing: Three Takes on the Jack Shear Drawing Collection, The Drawing Center
- 2022 – Black Melancholia, Hessel Museum of Art
- 2022 – Old and New Dreams: Recent Acquisitions in a Collection, Museum of Contemporary Art, Los Angeles
- 2022 – Drawing in the Continuous Present, The Drawing Center
- 2023 – Astrup Fearnley Collection, Astrup Fearnley Museet
- 2023 – Gallery 209: Objects of Desire, Museum of Modern Art
- 2023 – Before Tomorrow: Astrup Fearnley Museet 30 Years, Astrup Fearnley Museet
- 2025 – Upside Down Zebra, The Watermill Center
- 2025–2026 MONUMENTS, Museum of Contemporary Art, Los Angeles & The Brick (visual art space), curated by Hamza Walker, Bennett Simpson and Kara Walker
- 2026 Present Tension, Speed Art Museum, Louisville

=== Solo exhibitions ===
- 2016 – The Modern Institute, Glasgow, United Kingdom, Walter Price
- 2016 – Pearl Lines, Karma, New York
- 2018 – Pearl Lines, The Modern Institute, Glasgow, United Kingdom
- 2018 – Walter Price: Pearl Lines, Kölnischer Kunstverein, Cologne, Germany, Pearl Lines
- 2018 – Walter Price, MoMA PS1, Queens, New York
- 2019 – Walter Price: We passed like ships in the night, Aspen Art Museum.
- 2020 – The Modern Institute, Glasgow, United Kingdom, Walter Price
- 2020 – Walter Price: Pearl Lines, Greene Naftali, New York.
- 2021 – Walter Price: Pearl Lines, The Camden Art Centre, London. The artist's first major monograph accompanied the exhibition.
- 2022 – The Modern Institute, Glasgow, United Kingdom, Walter Price
- 2022 – Walter Price: Pearl Lines, Greene Naftali, New York.
- 2024 – Walter Price: Pearl Lines, Walker Art Center, Minneapolis, Minnesota
- 2025 – Walter Price: Pearl Lines, Greene Naftali, New York.

== Permanent collections ==
- Whitney Museum of Art, New York, NY
- Museum of Modern Art, New York, NY
- Centre Pompidou, Paris, France
- Tate, London, UK
- Studio Museum in Harlem, New York, NY
- Museum of Contemporary Art, Los Angeles, Los Angeles, CA
- Hammer Museum, Los Angeles, CA
- Walker Art Center, Minneapolis, MN
- High Museum of Art, Atlanta, GA
- Astrup Fearnley Museet, Oslo, Norway
- Fondation Louis Vuitton, Paris, France
- Fondazione Sandretto Re Rebaudengo, Turin, Italy
- Hessel Museum of Art, Annandale-on-Hudson, NY
- Aïshti Foundation, Lebanon
- Rollins Museum of Art, Orlando, FL

== Publications ==
- 2016 – Crystal Black, Karma, New York
