= George Rogers Clark Monument =

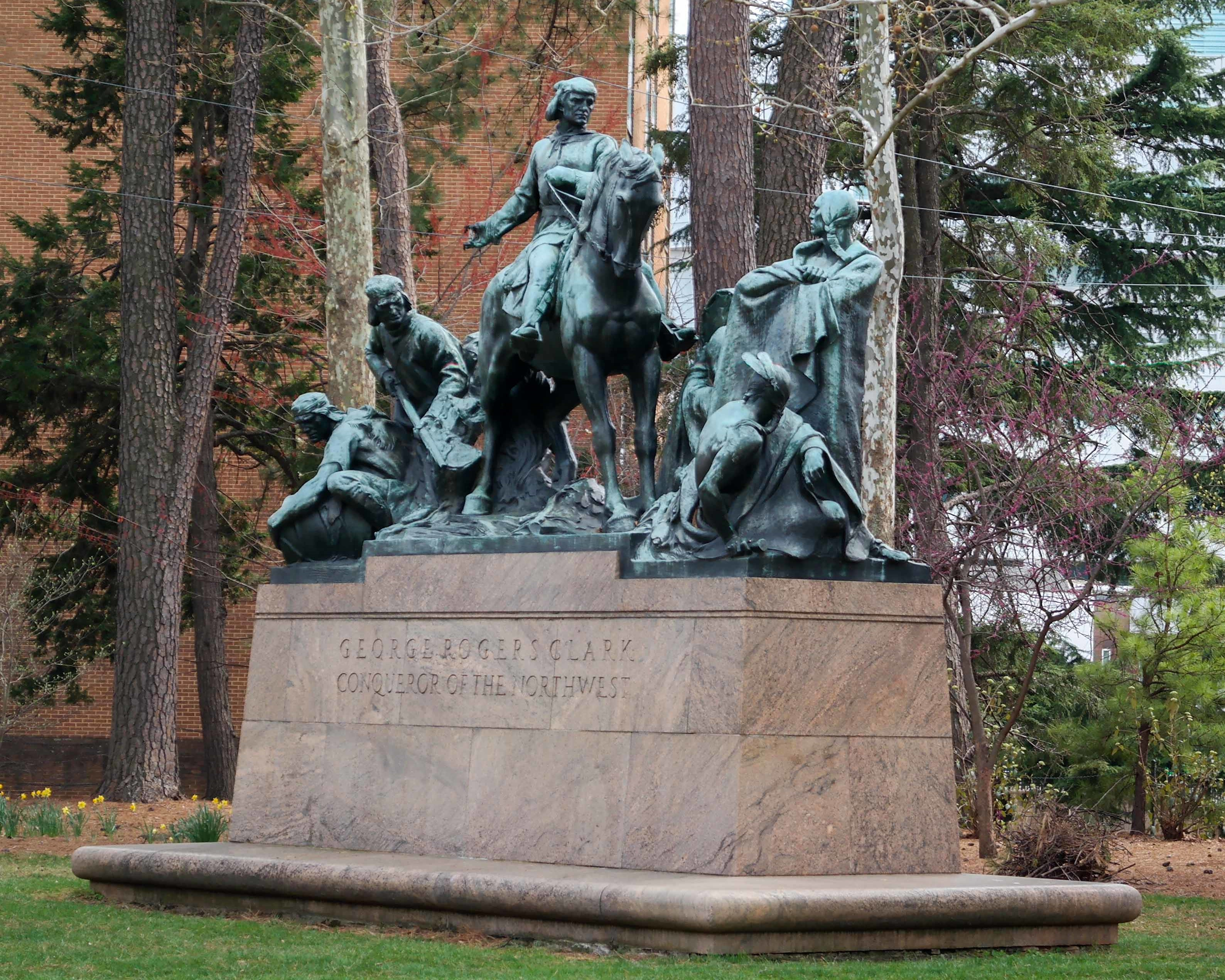
- The monument in 2015
- Artist: Robert Ingersoll Aitken
- Year: 1921
- Medium: Bronze and granite
- Location: 38°1′59″N 78°29′57″W
- George Rogers Clark Monument
- U.S. National Register of Historic Places
- Virginia Landmarks Register
- Location: Monument Square, bounded by University and Jefferson Park Aves. and the railroad tracks, Charlottesville, Virginia
- Area: less than one acre
- MPS: Four Monumental Figurative Outdoor Sculptures in Charlottesville MPS
- NRHP reference No.: 97000448
- VLR No.: 104-0252

Significant dates
- Added to NRHP: May 16, 1997
- Designated VLR: June 19, 1996

The George Rogers Clark Monument is a historic monument consisting of multiple figures that was formerly located in Monument Square at Charlottesville, Virginia. Erected in November 1921, the monument consists of seven figures, created by sculptor Robert Ingersoll Aitken, all positioned on the same pedestal. It is the last of four works commissioned from members of the National Sculpture Society by philanthropist Paul Goodloe McIntire between 1919 and 1924. The sculpture was added to the National Register of Historic Places in 1997.

The monument measures approximately 24 feet in height, 20 feet in length, and 8 feet in width. It includes a tall bronze figure of George Rogers Clark mounted on a stallion in the center. The pedestal bore the inscription: "GEORGE ROGERS CLARK/ CONQUEROR OF THE NORTHWEST."

== Removal ==
The University of Virginia removed the monument on July 11, 2021. That same month, Charlottesville removed three other controversial monuments which had been commissioned by McIntire. Its Stonewall Jackson monument was given to Kara Walker for transformation into the piece Unmanned Drone, the Robert E. Lee monument was melted into ingots for use in a new Charlottesville public artwork, and Their First View of the Pacific was moved to the Lewis & Clark Exploratory Center.

Upon the George Rogers Clark Monument's removal, the university did not announce immediate plans for what would be done with it, stating the school would consult with its students and members of the American Indian community of Charlottesville regarding its disposition. As of December 2025, the monument remained in storage.

== See also ==
- Charlottesville historic monument controversy
  - Equestrian statue of Stonewall Jackson (Charlottesville, Virginia)
  - Meriwether and William Clark Lewis (sculpture)
  - Robert E. Lee Monument (Charlottesville, Virginia)
- List of monuments and memorials removed during the George Floyd protests
