= At Ready (statue) =

Coordinates: 38°1′53.3″N 78°28′39.7″W

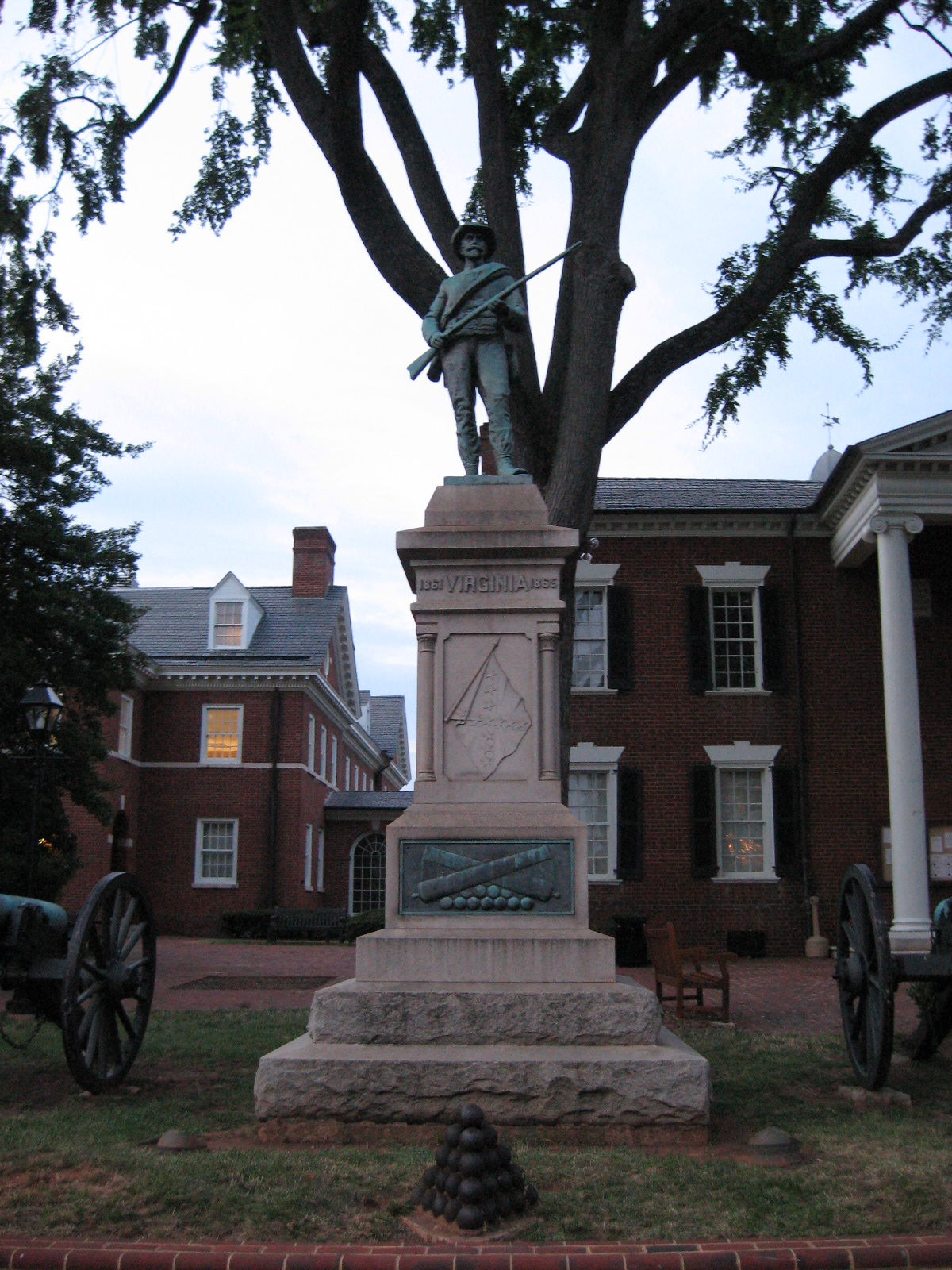
- The statue in 2008

At Ready (1909) is a memorial of a Confederate soldier originally located in front of the Albemarle County Courthouse in downtown Charlottesville, Virginia. The statue, popularly known as "Johnny Reb," and accompanying objects were removed on September 12, 2020. The statue and nearby cannon, and cannonballs were removed to be placed on display at the Third Winchester Battlefield, part of the Shenandoah Valley Battlefields National Historic District.

== History ==
The statue was unveiled on May 5, 1909, the anniversary of the 1857 creation of the Monticello Guard, a militia company in Charlottesville that formed in front of the Albemarle County Courthouse when Virginia seceded from the union in 1861, and became part of the 19th Virginia Infantry.

=== Relocation ===
On August 6, 2020, the Albemarle County Board of Supervisors voted unanimously to remove the statue. While several Virginia communities removed monuments in 2020 due to safety concerns amidst widespread protests, Albemarle was the first locality to remove a war memorial under the procedures of a recently passed statues bill that went into effect on July 1, 2020. The statue was gone in September 2020.

== See also ==
- Albemarle County Courthouse Historic District
- Charlottesville historic monument controversy
- List of monuments and memorials removed during the George Floyd protests § Virginia
