= McIntire Amphitheatre =

Outdoor theater at the University of Virginia

Coordinates: 38.03363°N 78.50576°W

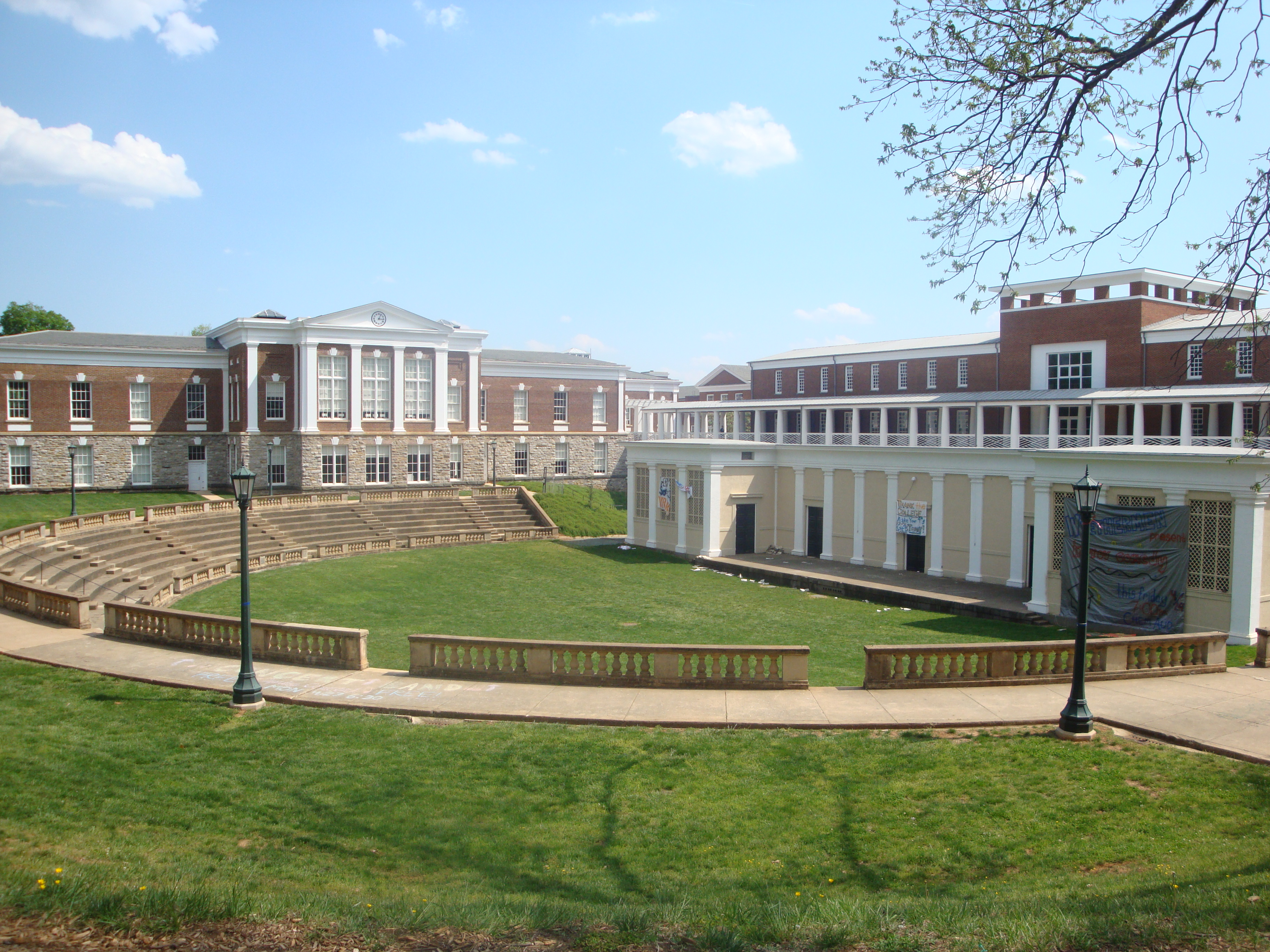
McIntire Amphitheater

The McIntire Amphitheatre is a Greek-style outdoor theater at the University of Virginia. Established in 1921 with a $120,000 gift from benefactor and University alum Paul Goodloe McIntire, it is now used for a variety of outdoor gatherings including concerts, speakers, and other events.

== History ==
Paul Goodloe McIntire contributed several sizable gifts to the University of Virginia in the early 1920s. Along with gifts to establish the McIntire School of Commerce and the McIntire Department of Music, he contributed $120,000 to fund the amphitheatre. The theatre was part of an existing plan, drafted starting in 1911 by Warren H. Manning, as part of a master plan for a new quadrangle including Common Hall (now Garrett Hall) and Minor Hall. The theatre was intended as an open air space for "concerts, debates, and the like". At the time it was built, the amphitheatre was only the seventh Greek-style outdoor theatre in the United States.

The amphitheatre was designed by Fiske Kimball, who also supervised the building of Memorial Gymnasium and the campus of the Woodberry Forest School. It was first used as the site of the 1921 commencement and the celebration of the university's centennial. It was the site of commencements until the mid-1940s.

The amphitheatre was less used in the mid-20th century and was threatened with demolition in the 1960s. During the 1970s, the grassy portion was converted to a parking space. This was converted back in the 1980s as the space became used again for outdoor performances, including visits from hypnotist Tom DeLuca, a 1991 concert for first-years by the Dave Matthews Band featuring Boyd Tinsley's first appearance with the group, and an album release concert for the Dave Matthews Band's Under the Table and Dreaming.

In the 1990s, the visual aspect of the amphitheatre changed as the row of maples that previously served as the backdrop was blocked from view by the construction of Bryan Hall.

The amphitheatre is still used for large public gatherings. In recent years, it has notably been the site of vigils for slain UVA lacrosse player Yeardley Love and for the victims of the Virginia Tech mass shooting, as well as for addresses by celebrities including UVA alum Tina Fey.

=== Organ ===
As built, the amphitheatre included an outdoor organ in a chamber to the left of the amphitheatre stage. The organ, designed by M.P. Möller, was constructed explicitly for "open air" use. According to a booklet published by the builder:

One wing of the stage group was constructed to house the organ. This concrete chamber is divided into four separate sections or sub-chambers. Two of these house the organ proper. The openings, for tone egress, are filled with bronze screens, back of which are the expression shutters for the various departments, and, in addition, there have been provided rolling steel shutters to fully protect the organ from the weather. In a third room is located the large electric blower ... to which is directly connected the low voltage compound electric generator which produces the current for the organ action ... The console, or keyboard, is of movable type, permanently mounted, together with the player's bench, on a special platform on rollers ... When the organ is not in use, the entire console unit is housed in the fourth chamber.

The specifications of the organ were jointly designed by the builder and by Arthur Fickenscher.

Reports from university faculty indicate that the organ could be heard "a mile away" and that it was designed for playing loud music, many of the traditional quieter stops not being included in its construction. The organ was still in use and playable in the early 1960s, but the organ and console had sustained damage due to mismanagement of the weather shutters. In the early 1980s the organ was removed and presumably destroyed.

== Physical plan and location ==
The McIntire Amphitheatre is located to the south and west of The Lawn. It is bordered on the east by Cocke Hall, to the west by Minor Hall, to the north by Garrett Hall and the West Range and gardens, and to the south by Bryan Hall.

The amphitheatre has a 60-foot stage backed by a neoclassical structure that once contained the outdoor organ and now houses offices for the UVA Facilities Management team. A semicircular grass patch, surrounded by gravel, faces the stage, and is surrounded by concrete steps offering seating for approximately 1,500 people. A sidewalk surrounds the steps, from which steps ascend to Minor Hall and Garrett Hall.
