= Robert E. Lee Monument (Charlottesville, Virginia) =

Destroyed equestrian statue

- Robert Edward Lee
- U.S. National Register of Historic Places
- U.S. Historic district – Contributing property
- Virginia Landmarks Register
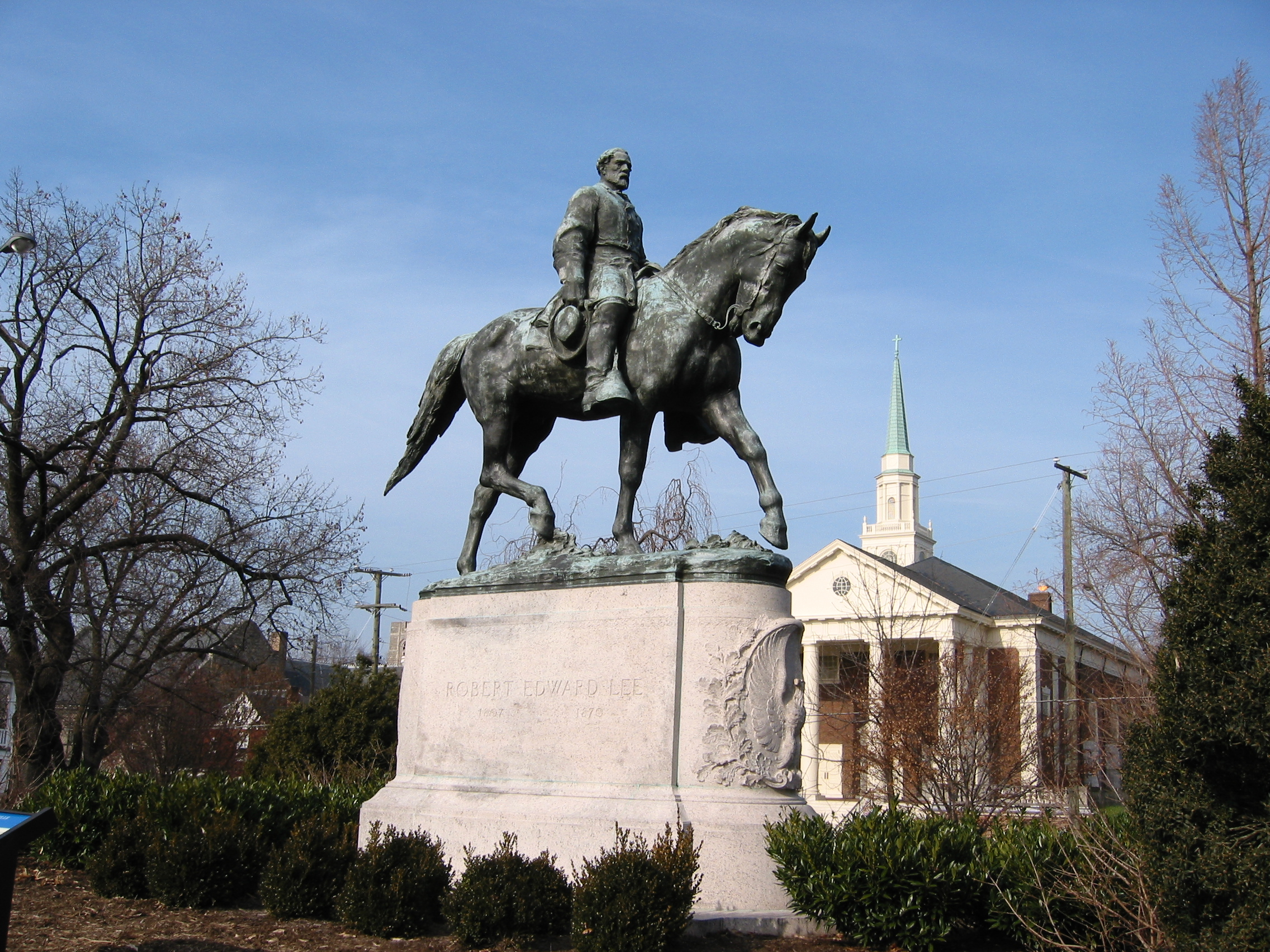
- The sculpture in January 2006

- Location within Virginia Location within the United States
- Location: Market Street Park, bounded by Market, Jefferson, 1st and 2nd streets, Northeast
- Coordinates: 38°1′54″N 78°28′50″W
- Area: less than one acre
- Built: 1924
- Architects: Walter Blair; sculptors, Henry Shrady, Leo Lentelli
- Architectural style: bronze sculpture
- MPS: Four Monumental Figurative Outdoor Sculptures in Charlottesville MPS
- NRHP reference No.: 97000447
- VLR No.: 104-0264

Significant dates
- Added to NRHP: May 16, 1997
- Designated VLR: June 19, 1996

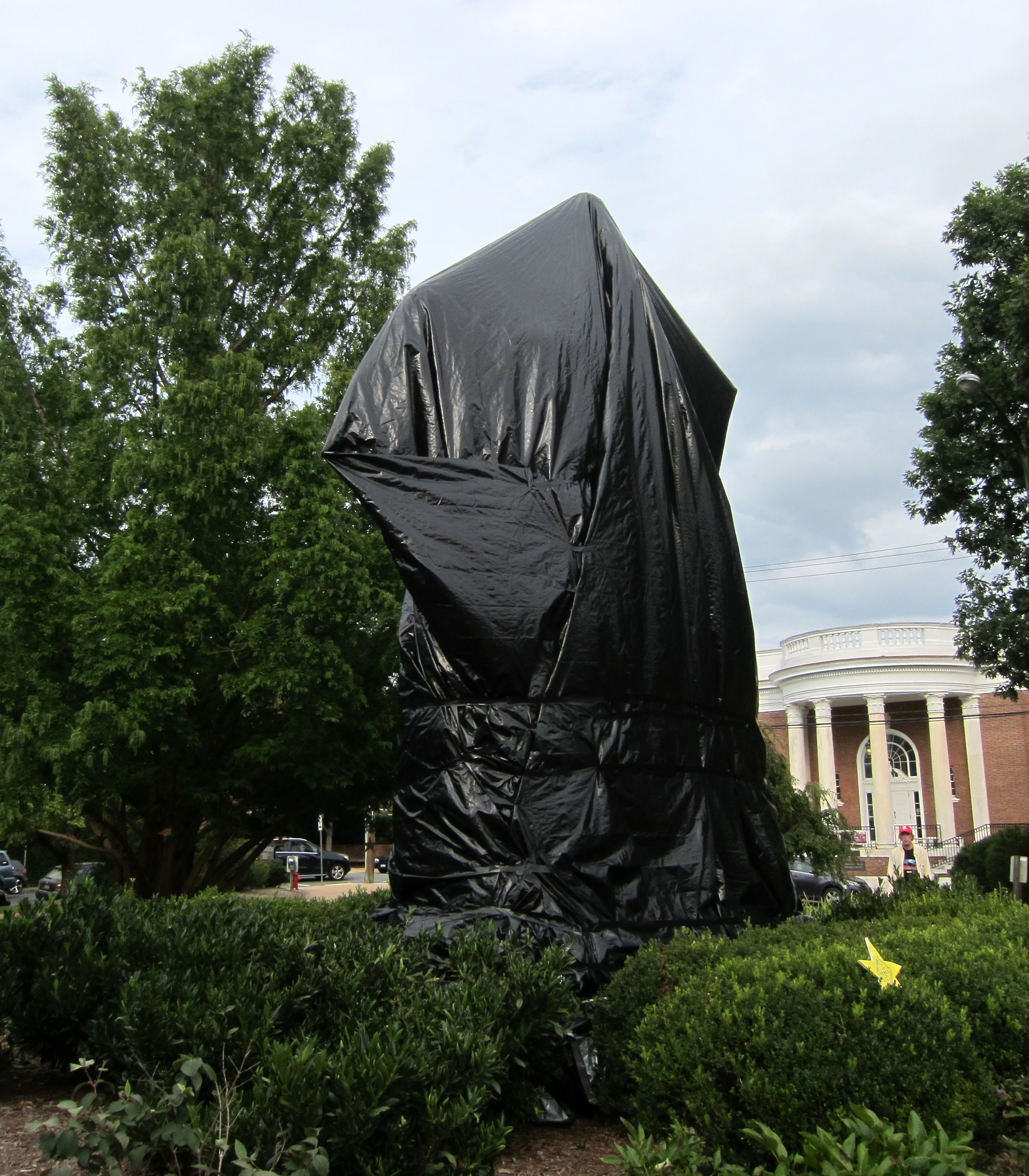
Lee sculpture covered in black tarpaulin following the Unite the Right rally of 2017

The Robert E. Lee Monument was an outdoor bronze equestrian statue of Confederate general Robert E. Lee and his horse Traveller located in Charlottesville, Virginia's Market Street Park (formerly Emancipation Park, and before that Lee Park) in the Charlottesville and Albemarle County Courthouse Historic District. The statue was commissioned in 1917 and dedicated in 1924, and in 1997 was listed on the National Register of Historic Places. It was removed on July 10, 2021, and melted down in 2023.

In February 2017, as part of the movement for the removal of Confederate monuments and memorials, the Charlottesville City Council voted 3–2 for the statue's removal, along with the city's Stonewall Jackson statue, and for Lee Park to be renamed. The removal proposal generated controversy. A lawsuit was filed on March 20, 2017, and in May 2017 a temporary injunction against its removal was granted by a judge, citing a Virginia state law that blocked the removal. White supremacists organized the Unite the Right rally for August 2017 to protest the proposed removal that drew numerous far-right groups from across the United States; this rally in turn caused counterdemonstrations, which in turn caused serious clashes; the event took a deadly turn when a white supremacist rammed a car into a crowd of counterdemonstrators, killing one and wounding 35. On August 23, 2017, the council had the statue shrouded in black, which in February 2018 a judge ordered removed. In July 2019 a permanent injunction was granted, and in July 2020 the state law was amended to remove the grounds for objection raised by the judge. The Virginia Supreme Court lifted the injunction in April 2021, holding that the state law thought to restrict the removal did not apply retroactively to statues passed before its effect (the law was applied to Virginia cities in 1997, but the statue had been erected in 1924). However, rather than immediately remove the statue, the city opted to employ the new removal process authorized under the law's 2020 amendments, which entails public notice, a public hearing after 30 days, and 30 days to field offers for relocation of the statue.

On July 9, 2021, the City Council announced that the Lee Monument would be removed the following day, and, on July 10, 2021, both the Lee and Jackson statues were removed by the city. The Lee statue was given to Swords into Plowshares, which melted it down in October 2023 with the intention of later turning the metal into a new public artwork. The city gave the Jackson statue to The Brick, where Kara Walker transformed the statue into her piece Unmanned Drone. This was used with the Lee statue's ingots for the 2025 Monuments exhibition. In 2026, Swords into Plowshares announced that Dana King and Model of Architecture Serving Society would use the ingots to produce ROOTED, a new baobab sculpture for Market Street Park.

== History ==
In 1917, Paul Goodloe McIntire commissioned the statue from the artist Henry Shrady (1871–1922). It was the second of four works McIntire commissioned from members of the National Sculpture Society. He wanted a public setting for the statue, buying a city block of land and demolishing existing structures on it to create a formal landscaped square, later named Lee Park (currently Market Street Park), the first of four parks McIntire would donate to Charlottesville.

Shrady was chronically ill at the time of the commission – he worked on it slowly and it was still unfinished on his death in 1922. Leo Lentelli (1879–1961) completed the sculpture in 1924, and it was dedicated on May 21 of that year. It was cast in the Roman Bronze Works of Brooklyn, New York. Comparison with a surviving model of the proposed statue by Shrady reveals Lentelli's version is less animated than that intended by Shrady. The oval granite pedestal was designed by the architect Walter Blair and on its side had the inscription "Robert Edward Lee" with the dates 1807 and 1870. The sculpture and pedestal combined were approximately 26 feet high, 12 feet long, and 8 feet wide (7.9 m × 3.7 m × 2.4 m) at the bottom of the pedestal.

== Attempts to remove the statue ==
At the 2012 Virginia Festival of the Book, Charlottesville City Council member Kristin Szakos commented that she thought the city should discuss taking its Confederate monuments down. She recalled that her audience was shocked and she began receiving threats. At one point in 2015, someone spray-painted "Black Lives Matter" on the base of the Lee statue, but the city soon cleaned it.

In March 2016, high-schooler Zyahna Bryant sent an open letter to the Charlottesville City Council titled "Change the Name of Lee Park and Remove the Statue". She was inspired by an earlier school assignment on making change and the activism of Bree Newsome around Confederate flag removal a year before. Bryant expanded her letter into a Change.org petition, gathering hundreds of signatures. She wrote in the petition: "As a teenager in Charlottesville that identifies as black, I am offended every time I pass it. I am reminded over and over again of the pain of my ancestors and all of the fighting that they had to go through for us to be where we are now".

A few days later, Charlottesville's Vice Mayor Wes Bellamy publicly called on the city council to remove the Lee statue and rename Lee Park, saying that the statue's presence "disrespected" parts of the community, and that he had "spoken with several different people who have said they have refused to step foot (sic) in that park because of what that statue and the name of that park represents. And we can't have that in the city of Charlottesville." Local NAACP head Rick Turner supported removal, calling Lee a terrorist. Others accused the council and Bellamy of disregarding Lee's historical significance, overlooking his importance to Virginia, sowing division, and trying to rewrite history. Bryant commented: "Keeping a statue here is representing hate and a subliminal message of racism that has existed in Charlottesville for a very long time".

In April 2016, the city council appointed a special commission, named the Blue Ribbon Commission on Race, Monuments and Public Spaces, to recommend to city officials how to best handle issues surrounding the statues of Stonewall Jackson in Court Square and Lee in Lee Park, as well as other landmarks and monuments. Early in November 2016, the Blue Ribbon Commission voted 6–3 to let both statues remain in place. On November 28, 2016, it voted 7–2 to remove the Lee statue to McIntire Park in Charlottesville and 8–1 to keep the Jackson statue in place, delivering a final report with that recommendation to the Charlottesville City Council in December.

On February 6, 2017, the city council voted 3-2 to remove the Lee statue and, unanimously, to rename Lee Park. By June, the city council unanimously passed a resolution to name Lee Park to Emancipation Park and Jackson Park to Justice Park.

=== Lawsuit ===
In response, a lawsuit was filed on March 20, 2017, by multiple plaintiffs, including the Monument Fund Inc, the Sons of Confederate Veterans, and descendants of the statue's donor and sculptor, to block the removal of the Lee and Jackson statues. The lawsuit sought a temporary injunction to halt the removal, arguing that the City Council's decision violated a state law designed to protect veterans' monuments and memorials, in this case veterans of the American Civil War, and that the council had additionally violated the terms of McIntire's gift to Charlottesville of the statue and the land for Lee Park.

The city responded by asking that the temporary injunction be denied, arguing that the two statues were not Confederate monuments and therefore outside the law's protection. The city also argued that the law did not apply to any monuments erected before it was amended to apply to cities in 1997 -- which argument ultimately prevailed.

In April 2017, the City Council voted 3-2 (exactly along the lines of the February vote) that the statue be removed completely from Charlottesville and sold to whomever the council chose.

On May 2, 2017, Charlottesville Circuit Court Judge Richard Moore issued a temporary injunction blocking the removal of the Lee statue for six months, in the public's interest, pending his final decision in the suit.

In October 2019 Moore ruled that local authorities in Charlottesville could not remove the two Confederate statues because they were war memorials protected by state law, and issued a permanent injunction preventing their removal.

On April 1, 2021, the Virginia Supreme Court overturned Moore's decision and lifted the injunction.

In December 2021, after the Lee statue's removal, the City Council approved a proposal to melt it down and repurpose the material for public art. A second lawsuit was filed by the Trevilian Station Battlefield Foundation and the Ratcliffe Foundation shortly thereafter. In 2023, the counts pertaining to the statue's fate were dismissed for lack of standing, clearing the way for the project to proceed.

=== Unite the Right rally ===
On May 13, 2017, neo-Nazi Richard B. Spencer led a torch-lit rally in Lee Park in protest of the City Council's decision to remove and sell the Lee statue and chanted "you will not replace us" and "Russia is our friend". Some of the ralliers procured bamboo tiki torches for a second, nighttime rally and shouted slogans including "Jews will not replace us", but put out their torches and left as police officers began to arrive to disperse them.

Counter-protesters gathered the following day and held a silent candlelight vigil that attracted over a hundred of the town's citizens, and Michael Signer, the mayor of Charlottesville. Signer, who opposed the statue's removal, condemned the initial rally the night before. The organizations dedicated to preserving the Lee statue issued a statement denying any involvement in the rally. Despite some conflict, no arrests were made and no one was injured.

On July 8, 2017, the Ku Klux Klan held a rally in Charlottesville protesting the city's plan to remove the statue. The approximately 50 Klansmen were met by several hundred counter-protesters. The police used tear gas to disperse the crowd, and made 23 arrests.

On August 12, 2017, during the Unite the Right rally, clashes broke out between supporters of the statue, who marched under Confederate, American, and Revolutionary flags, and counter-protesters. During the rally, counter-protester Heather Heyer was killed and 19 injured by a car ramming attack.

=== City and public responses ===
On August 20, 2017, the City Council unanimously voted to shroud both the Lee and Jackson statues in black. The council "also decided to direct the city manager to take an administrative step that would make it easier to eventually remove the Jackson statue." The statues were covered in black shrouds on August 23, 2017. On February 27, 2018, Judge Richard Moore ruled that the City of Charlottesville had to remove the black tarps covering the statues and the city complied, removing the shrouds a day later.

Sometime overnight between July 7 and 8, 2017, the Lee statue was vandalized by being daubed in red paint. It had been vandalized before; in June 2016, the pedestal was spray painted with the words "Black Lives Matter".

In 2018, the Lee statue was placed on the Make It Right Project's list of ten Confederate monuments it most wanted to see removed.

On October 14, 2019, both statues were damaged by a chisel (the Jackson statue being damaged a second time, as it was prior in September). Charlottesville police stated that they were investigating the vandalism. On November 28, 2019, the statue was painted with graffiti, saying: "Impeach Trump" and "This is Racist".

== Removal and melting down ==
On the morning of July 10, 2021, the Lee statue and Jackson statue were removed from their pedestals by the city. The mayor of Charlottesville, Nikuyah Walker, stated that "Taking down this statue is one small step closer to the goal of helping Charlottesville, Virginia, and America, grapple with the sin of being willing to destroy Black people for economic gain." The statue was taken away from the site on a flatbed truck. The city stated that the statue would be put into storage and the stone base removed at a later date, and that the final disposition of the statue was yet to be decided. Ten groups expressed interest in taking the statues, with six proposals ultimately submitted to the city.

In December 2021, the city council unanimously approved the Swords into Plowshares project by Charlottesville's Jefferson School African American Heritage Center (JSAAHC). The proposal involved melting down the Lee statue and repurposing its material for public art. Swords into Plowshares would choose the artist after holding many community discussions across Charlottesville. The project explained its choice to involve community input as a contrast to the Lee statue's creation, which was driven by the vision of its donor, Paul Goodloe McIntire. This proposal received over 30 letters of support, including from descendants of the community enslaved at Monticello and the Descendants of Enslaved Communities at the University of Virginia.

The city transferred ownership of the statue to the JSAAHC for the project, and the JSAAHC disassembled the statue to relocate it to a private location. The next day, the JSAAHC and Charlottesville were sued by the Trevilian Station Battlefield Foundation and the Ratcliffe Foundation, which had submitted declined proposals to the city council for the Lee and Jackson statues. The lawsuit sought to stop the Lee statue's destruction and have the city repair it, or donate its material to a civil war battlefield for use in a display cannon. While the lawsuit proceeded, the JSAAHC had to wait to melt the statue, but it began holding the project's community discussions. By mid-2023, all but one plaintiff and one count of the suit had been dismissed. This ruling allowed the JSAAHC to proceed with the Swords into Plowshares project.

In October 2023, the statue was taken to a foundry in an undisclosed location outside of Virginia. It was melted down over two weeks, and the process involved heightened security measures for attendee safety and in prevention of retaliation. The statue was melted into two tons of bronze ingots stamped with "Swords into Plowshares" and a logo of the Lee statue turning into flying birds. Jalane Schmidt, a co-founder of Swords into Plowshares along with Andrea Douglas, explained that the statue's sword was melted first "because the project is Swords into Plowshares and because the Confederacy was a military campaign to maintain and expand slavery", while the head was melted next "so they couldn’t put Humpty Dumpty back together again".

== Transformation ==
=== Monuments exhibition ===
In 2025, the bronze ingots produced from the melted Lee statue were displayed in the exhibition Monuments at the Museum of Contemporary Art, Los Angeles. The exhibit tackled the history of American commemoration of white supremacy and the Lost Cause, especially via Confederate monuments. The show combined 18 works of contemporary art, frequently by Black artists, with historic monuments in various states of transformation. Hamza Walker was inspired to create the show after the 2017 "Summer of Hate" and events in Charlottesville, Virginia.

In Monuments, the ingots from the Lee statue were stacked onto two pallets next to a containers of debris, charcoal and slag: metal impurities gathered from the material of the statue during its melting. The granite base to the Lee statue was also included in the exhibit, retaining graffiti stating "As white supremacy crumbles". Additionally, Charlottesville's Jackson statue was transformed for the show: the monument was remade into Unmanned Drone by Kara Walker. The Jackson statue was given to one of the show's organizations, The Brick, by the Charlottesville City Council so it could use the statue for this purpose. The Brick and Swords into Plowshares had communicated while forming their city council proposals for the statues.

=== ROOTED ===
By December 2025, Swords into Plowshares had three finalists for the art team that would use the Lee statue materials to create a new work of public art for Charlottesville. On July 10, 2026, the fifth anniversary of the Lee statue's removal, the project announced that a winner had been chosen via ranked choice voting within the community. ROOTED, by sculptor Dana King and Model of Architecture Serving Society (MASS), won with 64% of first-choice votes. MASS had previously designed the National Memorial for Peace and Justice in Montgomery, Alabama.

As of July 2026, the project proposes to install a 27-foot tall baobab tree sculpture at the center of Market Street Park, where the Lee statue once stood. The tree represents "pan-African symbolism for wisdom, longevity, and interconnection", and the inner side of the sculpture will be stamped with handprints from community members. New paths and seasonal gardens will be added to the park, and the baobab imagery may be added to other places in Charlottesville.

== See also ==
- George Rogers Clark (sculpture)
- Meriwether Lewis and William Clark (sculpture)
- Thomas Jonathan Jackson (sculpture)
- Virginia Regiment
- Removal of Confederate monuments and memorials
