= Meriwether Lewis and William Clark (sculpture) =

- U.S. National Register of Historic Places
- U.S. Historic district – Contributing property
- Virginia Landmarks Register
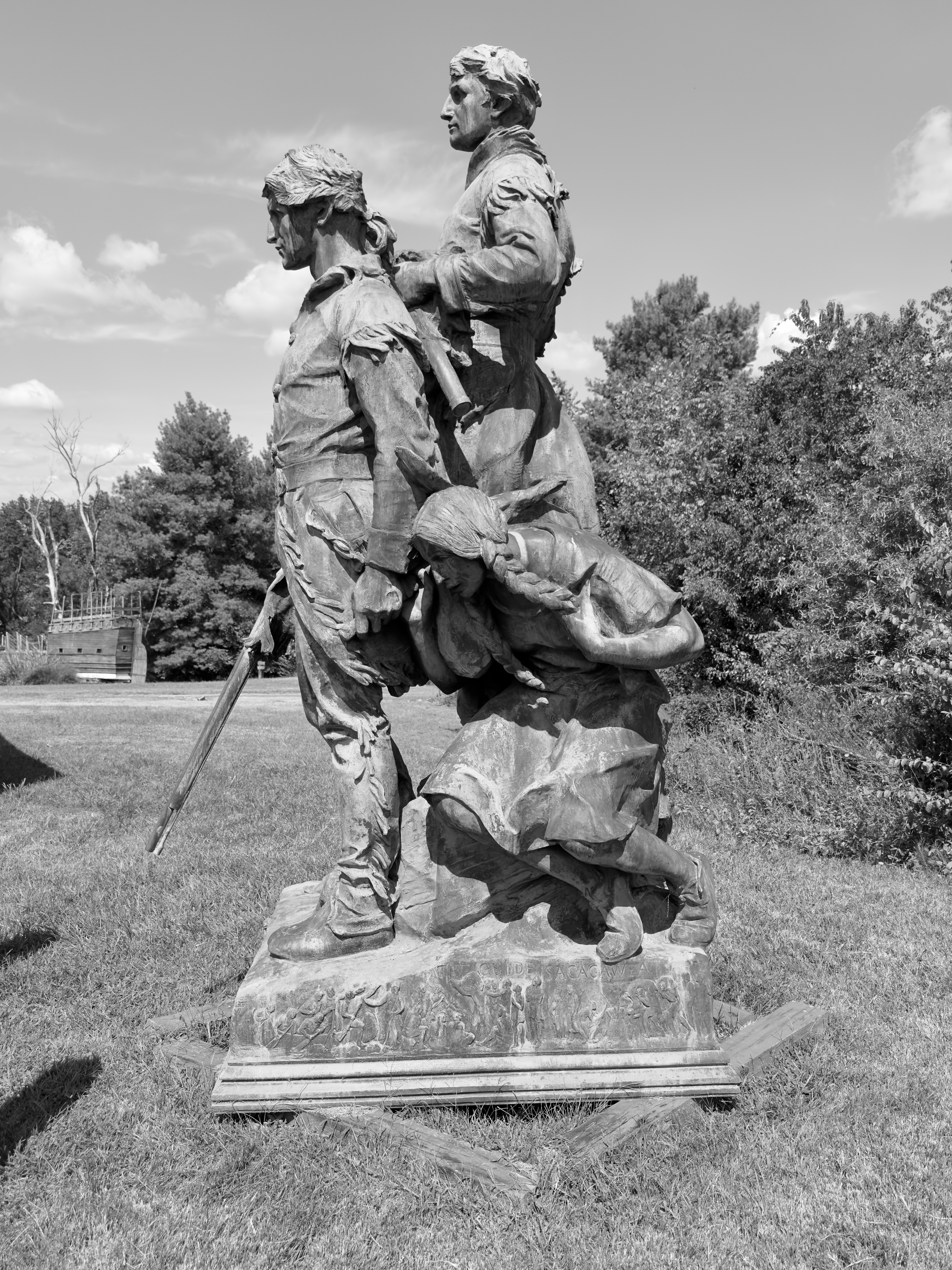
- Meriwether Lewis and William Clark sculpture, October 2025

- Location within Virginia Location within the United States
- Location: Darden Towe Park Charlottesville, Virginia
- Coordinates: 38°1′50″N 78°28′58″W
- Area: less than one acre
- Built: 1919
- Architect: Charles Keck
- Architectural style: bronze sculpture
- Part of: West Main Street Historic District (ID100001641)
- MPS: Four Monumental Figurative Outdoor Sculptures in Charlottesville MPS
- NRHP reference No.: 97000449
- VLR No.: 104-0273

Significant dates
- Added to NRHP: May 16, 1997
- Designated CP: September 18, 2017
- Designated VLR: June 19, 1996

Meriwether Lewis and William Clark is a historic bronze sculpture of Meriwether Lewis, William Clark, and Sacagawea located at Charlottesville, Virginia. Known as Their First View of the Pacific, it was sculpted by noted artist Charles Keck (1875–1951), and was the first of four commemorative sculptures commissioned from members of the National Sculpture Society by philanthropist Paul Goodloe McIntire. The sculpture was erected in 1919 and moved on July 10, 2021

It was listed on the National Register of Historic Places in 1997.

On July 10, 2021, following the removal of the Stonewall Jackson and Robert E. Lee statues, the city called for an emergency council meeting where it was decided that the statue, along with the George Rogers Clark sculpture, would also be removed that same day. It was removed at the request of descendants of Sacajawea.

The statue was later transported to Darden Towe Park, on the banks of the Rivanna River, where it has remained outdoors without formal display or conservation.

== See also ==
- Robert Edward Lee (sculpture)
- Thomas Jonathan Jackson (sculpture)
- George Rogers Clark (sculpture)
