= Equestrian statue of Stonewall Jackson (Charlottesville, Virginia) =

- Thomas Jonathan Jackson
- U.S. National Register of Historic Places
- U.S. Historic district – Contributing property
- Virginia Landmarks Register
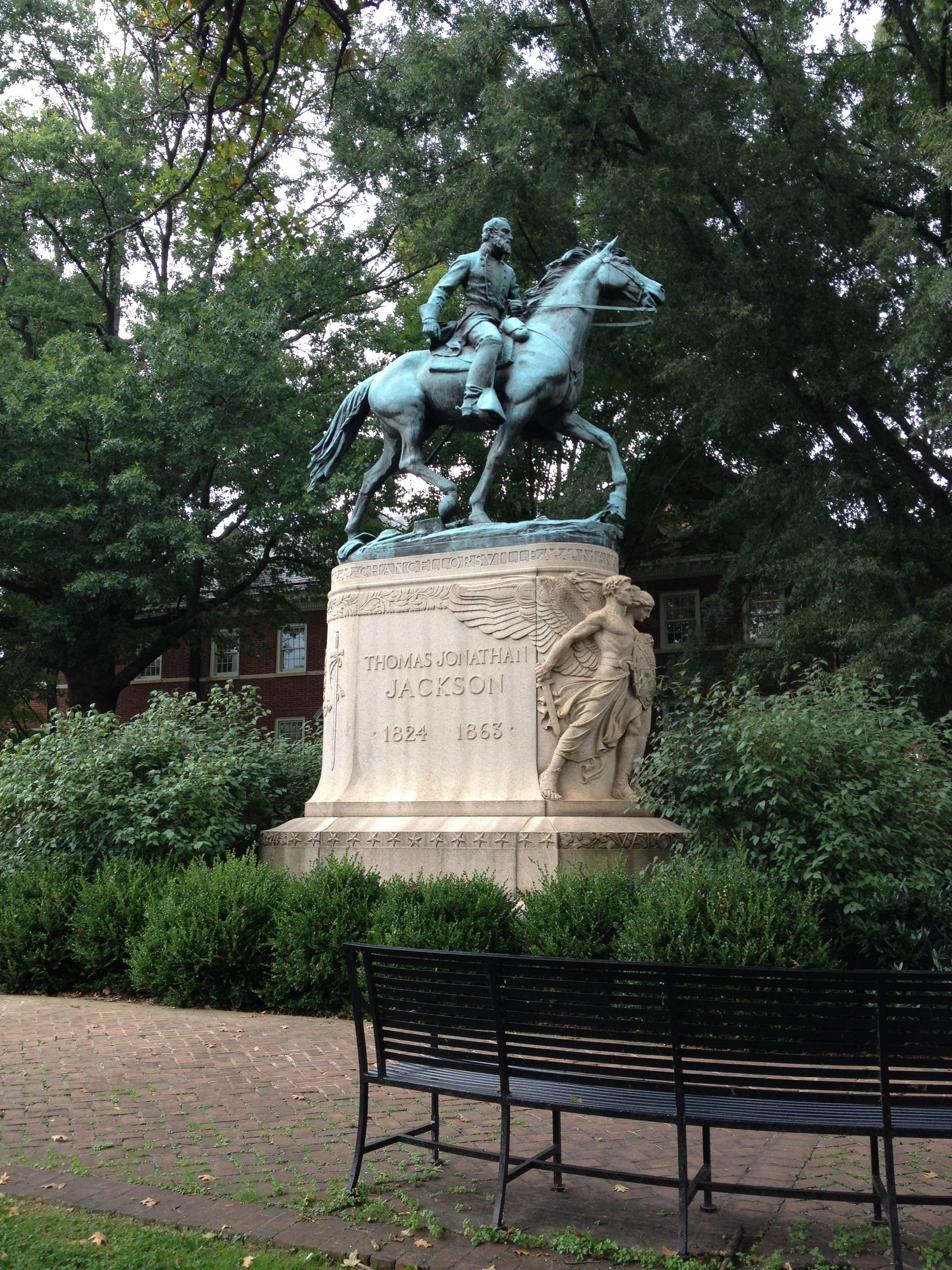
- The monument in 2014

- Location within Virginia Location within the United States
- Location: Jackson Park, bounded by High, Jefferson, and 4th Sts., and Albemarle Co. Courthouse, Charlottesville, Virginia
- Coordinates: 38°1′54″N 78°28′31″W
- Area: less than one acre
- Built: 1921
- Architect: Keck, Charles
- Architectural style: bronze sculpture
- MPS: Four Monumental Figurative Outdoor Sculptures in Charlottesville MPS
- NRHP reference No.: 97000446
- VLR No.: 104-0251

Significant dates
- Added to NRHP: May 16, 1997
- Designated VLR: June 19, 1996

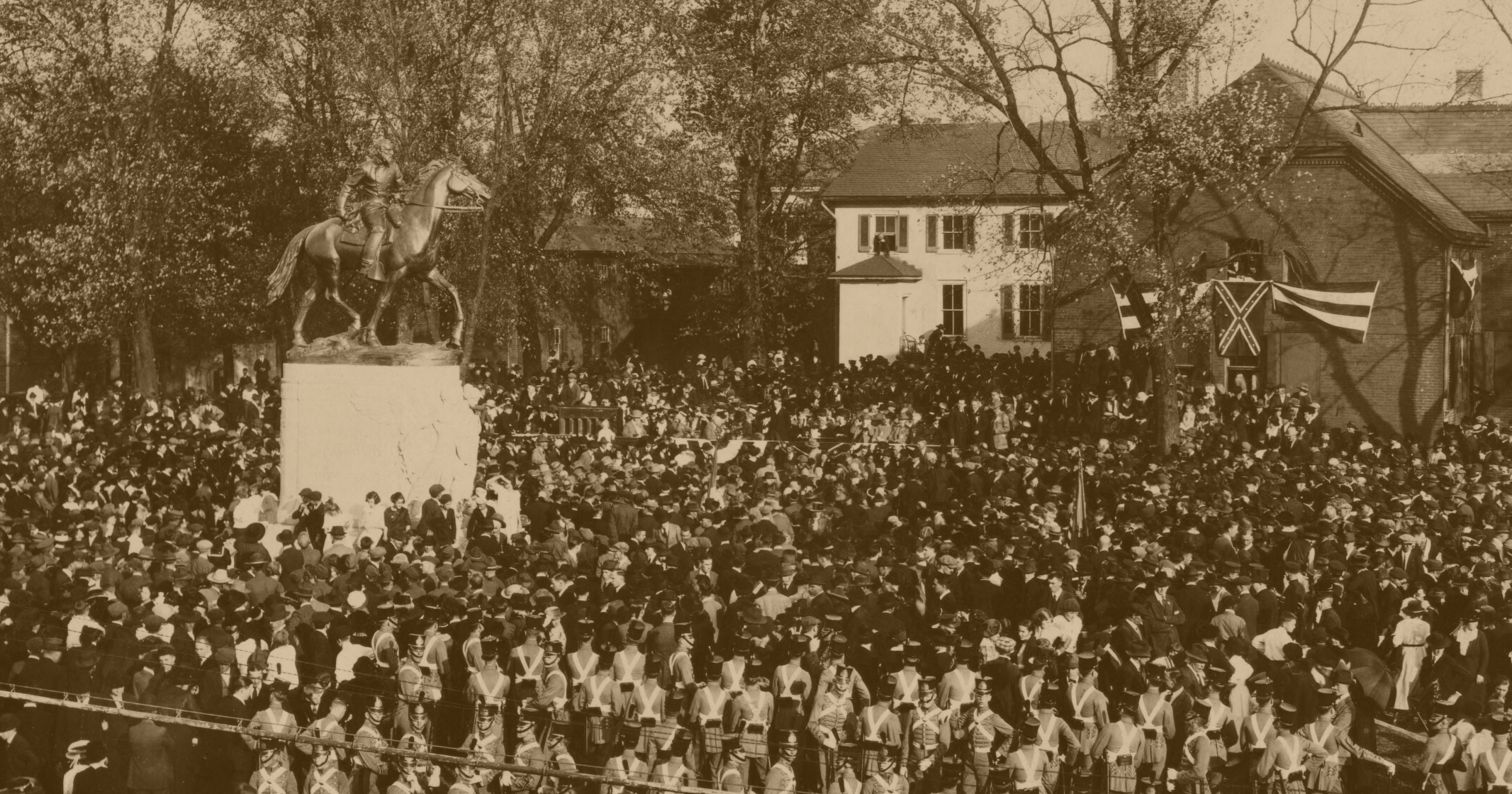
Photograph of the 1921 dedication of the statue

Thomas Jonathan Jackson was a bronze equestrian statue of Confederate general Stonewall Jackson which was located at Courthouse Historic District of Charlottesville, Virginia and installed in 1921. Sculpted by Charles Keck, it was installed in the city during a period of Confederate monument creation in the 1920s. Community organizing in 2016 resulted in the city council's decision to remove the monument and a related Robert E. Lee monument, but a Unite the Right Rally and lawsuits delayed their removals.

In 2021 both statues were removed. The Jackson statue was sent to Los Angeles, where the artist Kara Walker cut the statue into pieces and made them into a new sculpture, Unmanned Drone, presented in the exhibition Monuments. The Jackson monument's plinth was crafted into Love is dangerous by Bethany Collins for the same exhibition.

== History ==
In the early 1900s, McKee Row was a majority-Black community in Charlottesville, Virginia. The city forced its residents to move in a process similar to the displacement of Black residents near Lane High School, City Hall, and Vinegar Hill. In 1914, the Albemarle County Board of Supervisors seized the land in McKee Row for the city of Charlottesville, saying they were concerned about the neighborhood's influence on Levy Opera attendees and young men. The city promised to build a school for white children on the land, and by 1919, the city demolished the neighborhood's houses and established Jackson Park, which only allowed white people inside.

=== Creation of Jackson Park and statue ===
The stockbroker and philanthropist Paul Goodloe McIntire funded Jackson Park's establishment as part of a series of donations to Charlottesville. He named the park after Jackson and commissioned a monument to Jackson inside the park. It was the second of three statues McIntire donated to the city of Charlottesville, which he did over a period of five years from 1919 to 1924. The statue was sculpted by Charles Keck and was the third of four works that McIntire commissioned from members of the National Sculpture Society. Another of McIntire's donations was the Confederate monument to Robert E. Lee. Charlottesville installed further Confederate monuments in the 1920s.

The Jackson statue and park were established in Court Square next to the Albemarle County Courthouse, on the location of Charlottesville's old jail. Another Confederate statue had stood next to the courthouse since 1909.

The Jackson statue was dedicated in 1921 during an annual reunion of the Confederate Veterans and Daughters of the Confederacy. A 5,000 person parade ended at Jackson Park, where Anna Jackson Preston, a descendant of Jackson, unveiled the statue. The president of the University of Virginia spoke on behalf of McIntire and praised Jackson, with the attendees praising Confederate veterans and presenting Jackson as a hero.

=== Later history ===
The statue was listed on the National Register of Historic Places in 1997.

== Controversy and removal ==
In 2016, Charlottesville high schooler Zyahna Bryant created a petition to remove Charlottesville's Robert E. Lee monument. She wrote that passing by it offended her: "I am reminded over and over again of the pain of my ancestors". Her petition arose from a school assignment, but she expanded it into a Change.org petition to the Charlottesville City Council, and its hundreds of signatures attracted the notice of the city.

In April 2016, the city council appointed a special commission, named the Blue Ribbon Commission on Race, Monuments and Public Spaces, to recommend to city officials how to best handle issues surrounding Confederate statues and monuments in Charlottesville. In February 2017, as part of the removal of Confederate monuments and memorials, the Charlottesville City Council voted 3–2 for the statue's removal, along with the Lee Monument. The city also decided to rename the parks hosting each monument: changing Lee Park to Emancipation Park, and Jackson Park to Justice Park.

In 2017, white nationalists began meeting in Charlottesville to protest the plans to remove the Jackson and Lee monuments. This led to Charlottesville's August 2017 Unite the Right rally, when a neo-Nazi drove their car into a crowd of counter-protesters, killing one and injuring others. After the rally, the city chose to cover the statues in black tarps, until a judge ordered the city to remove the tarps months later. Lawsuits delayed the city from removing the statues for several years.

Both monuments were vandalized in September 2019, with "1619" graffitied on the Jackson statue, in reference to the date of the arrival of the first Africans in Virginia. It was vandalized again in October 2019. In 2020, a law blocking Charlottesville from removing war memorials was repealed. In 2020, Albemarle County removed the Jackson statue's neighbor, a Confederate statue made in 1909. It was sent to the Shenandoah Valley Battlefields Foundation. In 2021, lawsuits against the Jackson and Lee statues' removal were dismissed. In June 2021, the city council unanimously voted to remove the statues of Jackson and Lee, and they were taken down on July 10, 2021. Two other monuments were removed that month from public spaces in Charlottesville: like the confederate monuments, they had been commissioned by Paul Goodloe McIntire. The other moved monuments were Their First View of the Pacific and The Conquerer of the Northwest.

== Transformation ==
In December 2021, the Charlottesville City Council voted to transfer ownership of the Jackson statue to The Brick, a Los Angeles-based art nonprofit. The statue was moved to Los Angeles, where the artist Kara Walker cut the statue into pieces and formed a new sculpture out of it, titled Unmanned Drone. Walker completed the new sculpture in 2023, and it was included in the exhibition Monuments at the Museum of Contemporary Art, Los Angeles, which opened in 2025. The museum acquired Unmanned Drone in 2026.

The granite plinth that had supported the Jackson statue was sculpted by Bethany Collins into the work Love is dangerous, involving a series of rose petals. This work was also part of the Monuments exhibit. Likewise, the Lee statue, which had been melted down in 2023, was turned into a series of ingots displayed in the Monuments show. The ingots will be used as supplies for ROOTED, a public artwork in Charlottesville's Market Street Park and created by Dana King and the Model of Architecture Serving Society.

== See also ==
- George Rogers Clark Monument
- Meriwether Lewis and William Clark (sculpture)
- Robert E. Lee Monument (Charlottesville, Virginia)
