= Market Street Park =

Park in Charlottesville, Virginia, United States

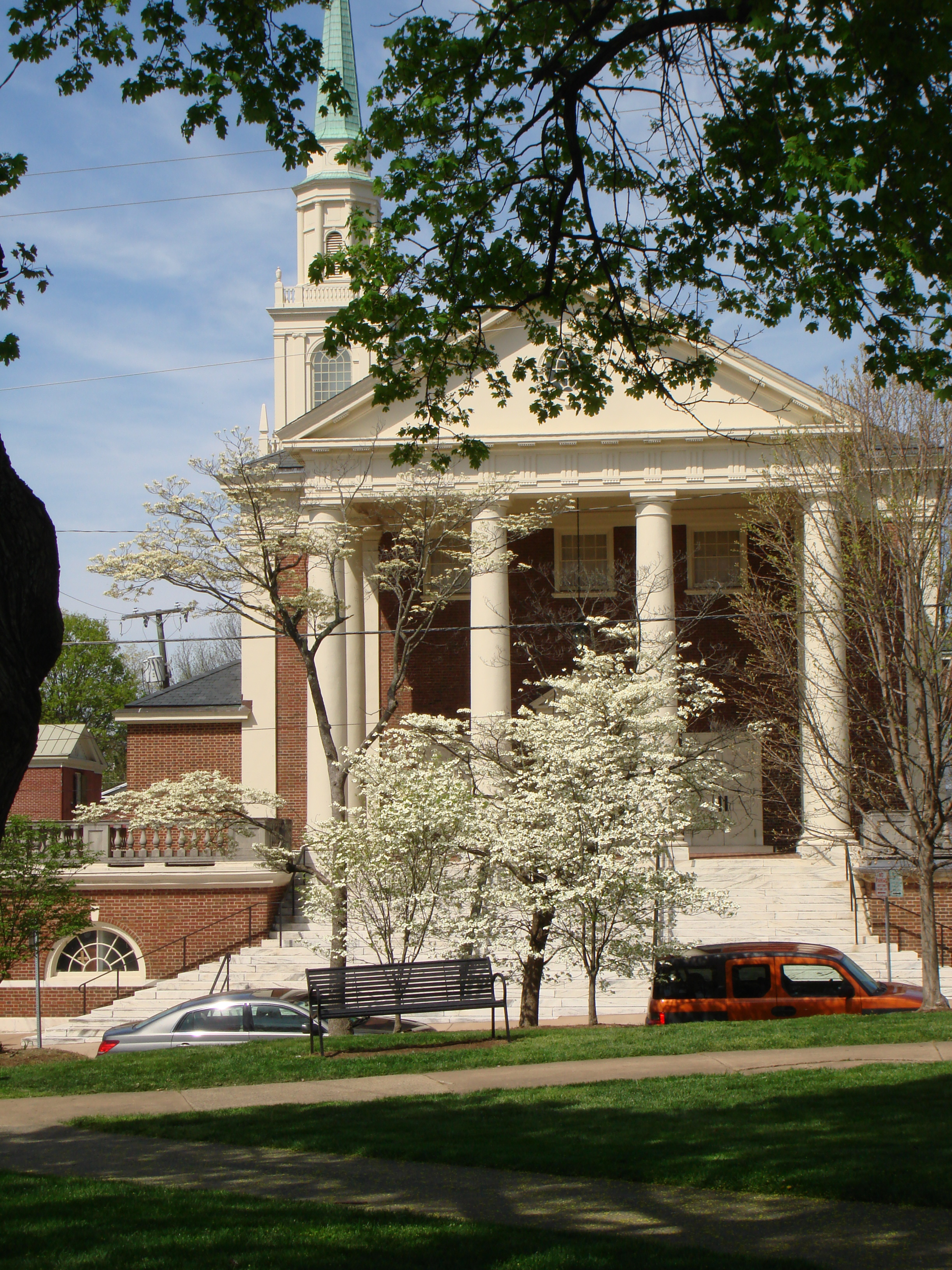
- The park in 2009
- Interactive map of Market Street Park
- Location: Charlottesville, Virginia, U.S.
- Coordinates: 38.0318°N 78.4806°W
- Area: 1.04 acres (0.42 ha)
- Established: 1917
- Website: Official website

Market Street Park, known as Lee Park until 2017, and as Emancipation Park from June 2017 to July 2018, is a public park in Charlottesville, Virginia, United States. Market Street Park is bordered on the north by Jefferson Street, on the south by Market Street, on the west by First Street N.E., and the east by Second Street N.E.

== History ==
The land for the park was purchased in 1917 by Paul Goodloe McIntire to be the setting for a bronze equestrian statue of Robert E. Lee and his horse Traveller that McIntire had commissioned. The park and the statue were donated to the city of Charlottesville by McIntire. The statue, although commissioned in 1917, was not cast until 1924 and it was finally placed in the park on Saturday, May 3, of that year.

In February 2017, the City Council voted to remove the statue from the park. However, a lawsuit opposing the removal was filed in March 2017 and the statue remained, pending the outcome of the lawsuit.

On June 5, 2017, the City Council, led by Mayor Michael Signer, voted unanimously to change the park's name to Emancipation Park.

The renaming of the park and the proposed removal of the statue on the site by the Charlottesville City Council was the catalyst for 2017 Unite the Right rally and a focus of controversy between those who want it removed and those who want it to remain.

In July 2018, the park was renamed Market Street Park by the Charlottesville City Council, following a petition that was submitted by community members who found the name Emancipation Park offensive due to its juxtaposition with the Lee statue.

The statue was removed on July 10, 2021, and was finally destroyed by melting in 2023.
