= Unmanned Drone (sculpture) =

2025 U.S. art installation

- Artist: Kara Walker
- Year: 2025
- Medium: Bronze
- Dimensions: 340 cm × 140 cm × 400 cm (132 in × 56 in × 156 in)
- Location: Museum of Contemporary Art, Los Angeles
- Accession: 2026.26

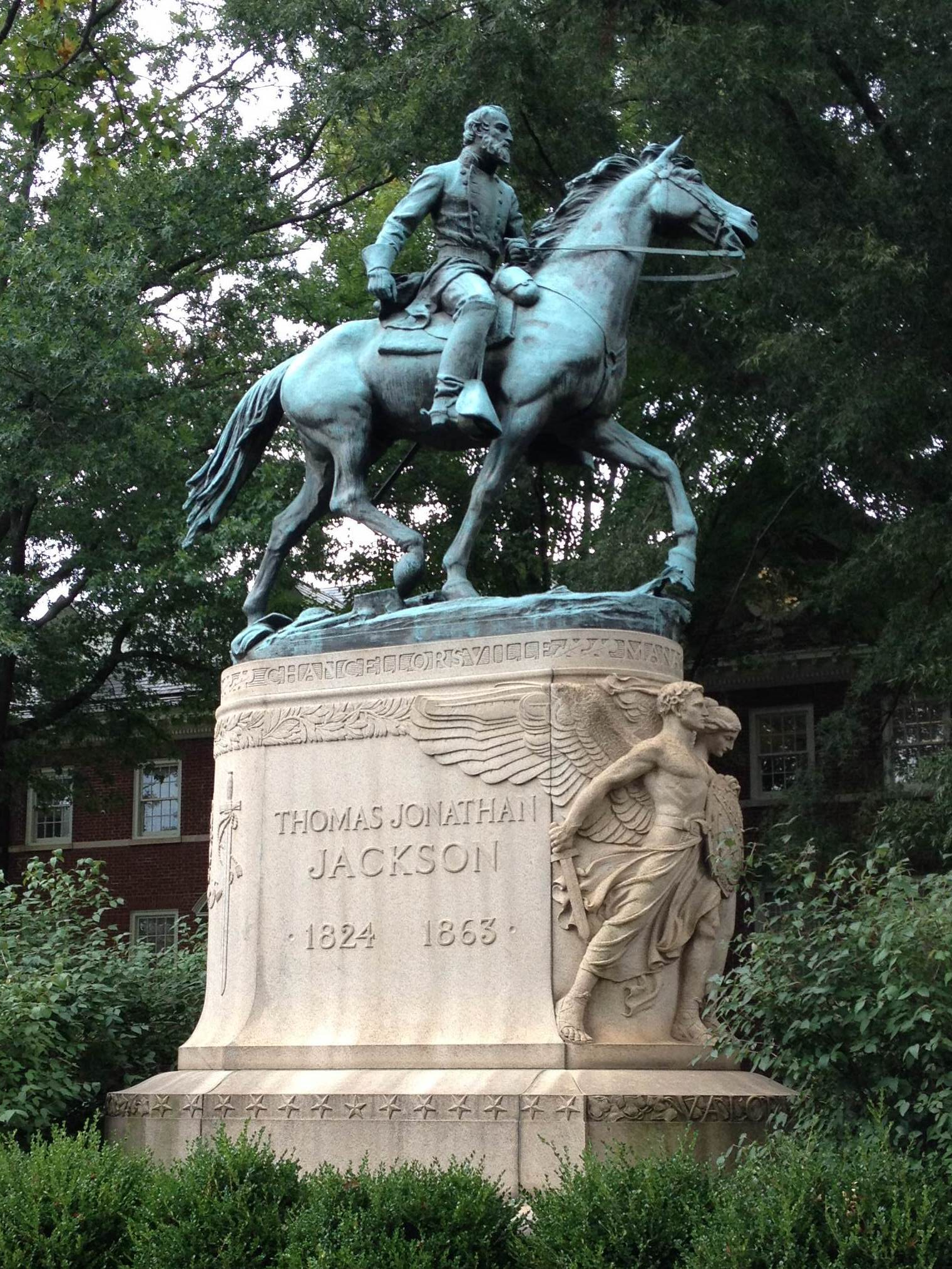
The monument to Stonewall Jackson from Charlottesville, Virginia, which artist Kara Walker used to create a new sculpture.

Unmanned Drone is a sculpture by American artist Kara Walker completed in 2023. The sculpture comprises the scraps of an equestrian statue of Confederate General Stonewall Jackson, completed in 1921 by Charles Keck for the city of Charlottesville, Virginia, which Walker reconfigured into a new form. It was commissioned by and debuted at the Los Angeles nonprofit art gallery The Brick in late 2025 as part of the exhibition Monuments. The Museum of Contemporary Art, Los Angeles acquired the work in February 2026.

== Creation ==
The Stonewall Jackson statue stood for one hundred years in Charlottesville. Following the deadly Unite the Right rally in 2017, the Charlottesville City Council voted to remove the statue, which led to hearings and lawsuits about the removal, which ultimately did happen. The City Council unanimously voted to grant ownership of the statute to The Brick.

== Reaction ==
Jason Farago of the New York Times called the work a "disordered new centaur" that "rattles its metal parts through American purgatory."
