= Jason Farago =

American journalist and writer

Jason Farago (born June 12, 1983, in New York City) is an American art writer who has been an art and culture critic for the New York Times since 2015.

== Biography ==
Farago studied and gained degrees in art history at Yale University in New Haven, Connecticut, and the Courtauld Institute in London before becoming an international art and culture critic.

In 2021 he stirred up controversy by suggesting that The Louvre in Paris should exhibit Leonardo da Vinci's Mona Lisa in its own dedicated space.

In 2023 he was a finalist for the Pulitzer Prize for Criticism. The Pulitzer Prize organization in awarding him the honor stated that it was "for art criticism, especially for taking a critical eye to the frontlines of Ukraine to explore the cultural dimensions of the war, including verifying damages to architecture and other sites and explaining Russia's efforts to erase the Ukrainian identity." Indeed in a "Critic's Notebook", Farago penned in-depth on-site coverage of how the war in Ukraine was not only a military one but a cultural one as well.

Farago is also the editor and co-founder of Even, an art magazine devoted to long-form criticism. Farago also writes for The Guardian, for which he previously served as their U.S. based art critic, The New Republic, and The New Yorker, as well being a regular contributor to Artforum. Though Farago lived and worked in London for a considerable span, he now once again lives and works in his hometown of New York City.
