= Paul Goodloe McIntire =

American stockbroker, investor, and philanthropist (1860–1952)

- Born: May 28, 1860; Charlottesville, Virginia, U.S.
- Died: July 1, 1952 (aged 92); New York, U.S.
- Resting place: Maplewood Cemetery, Charlottesville, Virginia
- Education: University of Virginia
- Occupations: Stockbroker, investor
- Known for: Charlottesville-area philanthropy
- Spouse(s): Edith Clark (1891–unknown); Anna Dearing Rhodes (1921–1933); Hilda Berkel Hall (1934–1952)
- Children: 1

Paul Goodloe McIntire (1860–1952) was an American stockbroker, investor, and philanthropist from Virginia. He served on the Chicago and New York Stock Exchanges. He was a generous donor to the University of Virginia and its home, the city of Charlottesville.

== Early life ==
Paul Goodloe McIntire was born in 1860 in Charlottesville, Virginia. He attended the University of Virginia for one session, 1878–1879, and then left "since I had to make a living."

== Career ==
McIntire started his career as a coffee trader in Chicago, purchasing a seat on the Chicago Stock Exchange, then moved to New York and the New York Stock Exchange in 1901. He retired to Charlottesville in 1918.

== Philanthropy ==
McIntire was a generous philanthropist. Virginia historian Virginius Dabney notes that he gave nearly $750,000 to the University of Virginia in named gifts, in addition to gifts to the city of Charlottesville and other anonymous donations, and that by 1942 he had given away so much of his fortune that he "was struggling to live within his annuity of $6,000." He is best remembered for his $200,000 gift establishing a school of commerce and economics, today the McIntire School of Commerce, in 1921.

One of McIntire's most notable contributions to UVa was the endowment of the chair of Fine Arts, with the explicit goal of enriching the Charlottesville cultural experience. While a professorship of fine arts had been part of Jefferson's original plan for the University, no provision was made for a faculty of Fine Arts until McIntire's 1919 gift of $155,000 endowed the chair. He wrote to then-President Edwin Alderman that he hoped that "the University will see its way clear to offer many lectures upon the subject of art and music, so that the people will appreciate more than ever before that the University belongs to them; and that it exists for them." The McIntire Department of Music and the McIntire Department of Art were subsequently named in recognition of his gift.

Another of McIntire's contributions to the University was the McIntire Amphitheatre. At the time only the seventh Greek-style outdoor theatre in the United States, the theatre, established with a $120,000 gift in 1921, was intended as an outdoor performance space. He also donated $50,000 toward a new building for the University Hospital in 1924, a 1932 gift of $75,000 for the study of psychiatry, $100,000 for cancer research; $47,500 for the purchase of Pantops Farm, the financing of a concert series in Old Cabell Hall, the gift of a rare books collection to the library, and nearly 500 works of art to the University of Virginia Art Museum.

McIntire also financed a set of four public sculptures, George Rogers Clark, Thomas Jonathan Jackson, Robert Edward Lee, and Meriwether Lewis and William Clark, through the National Sculpture Society. These statues focus on figures sharing common themes of aiding the violent displacement of indigenous Americans (Clark, Lewis, and Clark) and celebrating the Lost Cause of the Confederacy (Lee and Jackson), thus attesting to McIntire's cultivation and support of white supremacy. All four of these sculptures were removed in July 2021.

McIntire was a recipient of the French Legion of Honor in 1929 for his founding of a children's tuberculosis hospital in France for refugees from the German-occupied north-east.
