= Hamza Walker =

American art curator

Hamza Walker is an American art curator and museum director, He is currently the director of The Brick visual art space and museum in Los Angeles, California.

He was awarded the Walter Hopps Award for Curatorial Achievement by the Menil Collection.

He was part of the force behind the notable Monuments exhibit put on by the Brick and the Museum of Contemporary Art, Los Angeles in 2026. In particular, he was the impetus behind purchasing the statue of Confederate general Stonewall Jackson, which artist Kara Walker then remade into the piece Unmanned Drone.
