= Bethany Collins =

American artist

- Born: 1984; Montgomery, Alabama
- Known for: Book artist
- Website: bethanyjoycollins.com

Bethany Collins (born 1984 Montgomery, Alabama) is an American artist. She received her Bachelor of the Arts degree from the University of Alabama in 2007, and her Master of Fine Arts degree from Georgia State University in 2012. Her work primarily engages the relationship between race and language, as her main medium include dictionaries, journals, encyclopedias, newspapers, etc.

In her thesis, Collins explains how growing up biracial in the south sparked her initial desire to work with definitions and old texts, in order to discover their underlying meanings. She recounts people always assuming that she and her family were unrelated, and how that lead to the pressure to define her own racial identity, because others couldn't easily fit her into the racial binary. She describes her work as "yet another attempt to navigate the black/white paradigm of race in the American South".

Collins also grew up in a Presbyterian church which would later have great influence over her work. Her church would hold 72 hour bible readings, where the children would sign up for a time slot and continue reading until the next reader showed up to relieve them. The beauty of this to her, was that often no one was in the church to hear them read, "a sacred text was still worthy of being read back into the world, even when no one was listening". That idea carried into her current performance art style.

== Career and exhibitions ==
Collins established and became well known for the purpose of her work fairly early on, every article featuring her essentially describes her as "a multidisciplinary artist whose conceptually driven work is fueled by a critical exploration of how race and language interact." She is known for how physically involved her creative process in, working until it hurts too much to continue going. Her style is unique, and she has received significant recognition and acknowledgement for it.

She was included in the 2019 traveling exhibition Young, Gifted, and Black: The Lumpkin-Boccuzzi Family Collection of Contemporary Art. She contributed an installation America: A Hymnal to the 2021 exhibition Jacob Lawrence: The American Struggle at the Phillips Collection in Washington DC.

Collins work, The Aeneid 1876 /1990 (2022), was include in the Art Dealers Association of America (ADAA) 60th anniversary Art Show in the fall of 2022.

In late 2022 through early 2023, Collins's work was included in a group exhibit at The Print Center of New York, "Visual Record: The Materiality of Sound in Print," curated by Elleree Erdos.

Her work is in the collection of the Studio Museum in Harlem where she was the Artist-in-Residence from 2013 through 2014.

== Works ==
- White Noise (2010) Series
  - Including the works: "Don't You Think That's a Little Elitist?", 2010, "Maybe You Should Make It Into a Slaveship", 2010, "Do People Ever Think You're White?" III, 2011, "It Was So Much More Intellectual Before You Told Me That", 2011, "(Unrelated)", 2012, "I Wish I Was Black", 2012, and "(Unrelated)", 2012
    - Being the only person of color in the MFA program at Georgia State University, Collins often experienced "awkward" conversations whenever discussing race and racial identity. During a critique of her mixed media piece, "Provin It", which consisted of overlapping brown paper bags with single black brushstrokes displayed on each one, Collins was asked "Don't you think that's a little elitist?". This piece was in reference to Brown Paper Bag Test, and her classmates felt that because they had never heard of it before, they were being excluded from its meaning. After this, more questions about Collins work continued to emerge, such as people suggesting "Maybe You Should Make It Into a Slaveship" in order for the narrative to be more easily accessible. Eventually, the White Noise series continued and questions from outside of Collins' graduate school experience were included. She describes these questions and statements from others to be "made by those attempting to isolate a simple solution to the binary paradigm or race in the U.S. and thus neatly decipher my own racial background".
- The Odyssey (2018–present)
  - This series consists of differing translations of Odyssey, erased to only leave one sentence legible in each, all presented side by side.
    - In this body of work, Collins erased each line by hand using her own saliva. Each phrase comes from the moment in the epic when Odysseus finds himself abandoned onshore but is unable to recognize his homeland.
- The Star Spangled Banner: A Hymnal (2020)
  - This series consists of three charcoal and acrylic paintings, each featuring lyrics from different versions of The Star-Spangled Banner.
    - This series seeks to bring to light the various forgotten lyrics of past versions of the national anthem. Collins researched 100 different versions of the national anthem, binding each anthem variation into a single book, and used a laser to cut out each musical note. The work itself is a retelling of American history, from varying perspectives, each trying to define its own version of what it means to be American. Collins includes versions that have been used to support different political causes, including the Confederacy, all the way up to the Women's Suffrage movement. In an article from The Art Newspaper, Collins describes this series as something that "challenges the notion of a cohesive American Identity". In discussing the process in which Collins made this series and worked with the physical texts, she explains that the smudges, burn marks, and smell are all important parts of her work, and that "the more the book is read and the pages turned, the more complicated and messy the work becomes". As Margaret Carrigan, the author of The Art Newspaper article wrote, the work is "fragile - not unlike the democratic ideals every version of the song is meant to celebrate".
- The Aeneid: 2017 / 2020 (2022)
  - This is a continuation of Collins Odyssey series.
    - In this work, she compares translations of Aeneid, when Aeneas is lost at sea. She features the same passage from separate translations, the first from 2017, "Violently we're blown off course and wander blindly through boiling waves", and the second from 2020, "Off course, we flail, with nothing left to reckon by". In an article from Patron gallery, these works are analyzed as "a speculative narrative arc analogous to our national political climate, one that denotes a people lost at sea."
- The Dixie of Our Union (2022)
  - This series consists of ten parts on paper in reference to the song Dixie (song), also known of the anthem of the Confederacy.
    - This work is a re-imagination of Collins' Dixie's Land (1859-2001) which she created in 2019-2020. Each version features charcoal drawings of police deploying tear gas onto protesters after the murder of George Floyd, over the sheet music. In this series, Collins only uses versions of the song used by the Union. As analyzed in an article from Patron gallery, "this choice is an attempt to connect Dixie not just to the South, but to the rest of the nation." In her interview with Patron, Collins explains, "As for these American songs, the lyrics shifting are an attempt to describe who we are even in its most inherent contradictions, who we are at any given moment."
- Auld Lang Syne (2022)
  - This is a sound installation accompanying The Star-Spangled Banner series and The Dixie of Our Union series at Collins exhibition at Patron Gallery.
    - This installation consists of fifty-one versions of Auld Lang Syne being sung at the same time, by five different singers. The focus is on the version that was historically sung by British soldiers during World War I. The melody remains the same, even as the lyrics change, which Collins describes as "familiar chaos".

== Impact ==
In mid 2021, following the killing of Breonna Taylor, the Promise, Witness, Remembrance exhibition was launched at the Speed Art Museum in Louisville. Collins was one of a few artists that were featured. Collins work is being utilized to showcase and educate people on the ideologies of America, its founding, history, and promises that come with the symbols that its people uphold to be representative. Her work is also being used to call people to witness what is currently happening in American society, the promises that have been unfulfilled. Lastly, it is cementing critical analysis of decades old racism that continues to exist in modern day celebrated iconography and song, to open people's eyes and ensure, best it can, that people like Breonna Taylor will not be forgotten.
