= The Brick (visual art space) =

The Brick is a visual art space in Los Angeles, California.

It was founded as LAXART in 2005 by Lauri Firstenberg. In 2015, The Brick moved into a former 1928 recording studio. It moved again and until 2022 was in West Hollywood in a space now occupied by famed curator and former MOCA LA director Jeffrey Dietch's gallery. The latest space opened on June 16, 2024.

The name was inspired by the exposed brick walls of the new location, the idea the space is part of a cooperative community with a construction role, and also the notion of a brick as a tool or weapon or revolution.

The Brick has 4,000 square feet (370 square meters) of exhibition space, plus a courtyard.

Hamza Walker became the director in 2016.
