= Laxson =

Laxson may refer to:

== People ==
- Ruth Laxson (1924–2019), American artist
- Shelby A. Laxson (1913–1982), American politician

== Places ==
- Laxson Creek, Texas, United States
