= Fons Americanus =

Sculpture by American artist Kara Walker

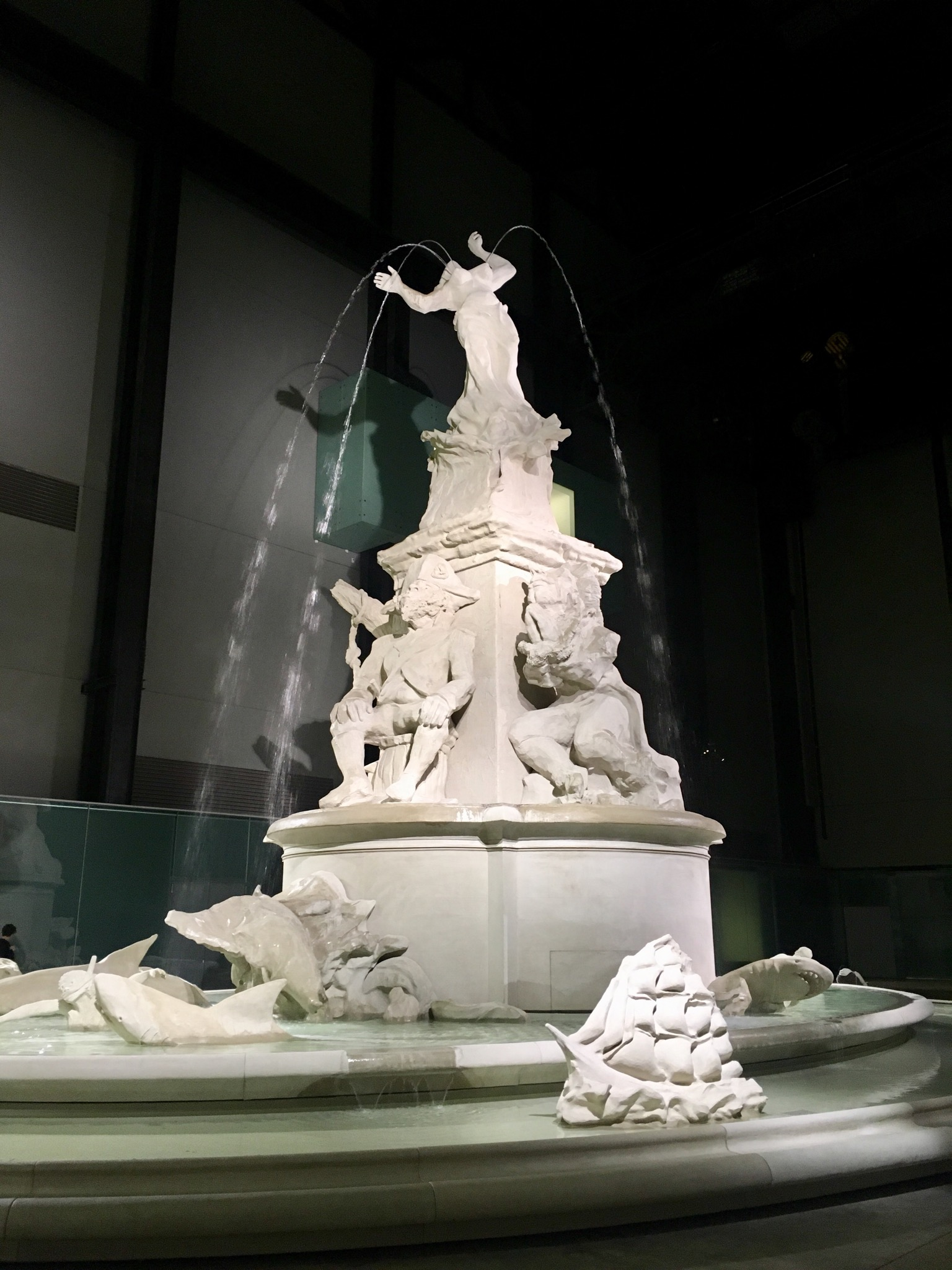
- Artist: Kara Walker
- Year: 2019
- Location: London

Fons Americanus was a sculpture, taking the form of a functional fountain adorned with allegorical scenes and figures, created by the American artist Kara Walker. The sculpture was housed in the Tate Modern’s Turbine Hall from late 2019 to early 2020, and was destroyed at the end of its time there.

== Development and presentation ==
The work was commissioned by the Tate Modern for its Turbine Hall, part of a series funded by the Hyundai Motor Company. Other artists whose work has been featured in the Turbine Hall as part of the series include Tania Bruguera, Philippe Parreno, and Abraham Cruzvillegas. Walker was inspired by the Victoria Memorial, which she first saw from the window of a car.

Walker personally designed models for the figures on the sculpture. This involvement differed from the process of creating her 2014 sculpture A Subtlety, where teams created the work, guided by Walker's drawings.

== Form and materials ==
The work was 13 meters tall and was a fully functional fountain. The sculpture was made of cork, metal, and wood coated in jesmonite designed to be recyclable. The fountain includes sculptures evocative of the Atlantic slave trade and history of slavery in British colonies. These culminate in a female figure at the top of the fountain, from whose breasts and slashed throat the fountain's water originates.

== Reception ==
=== Interpretation ===
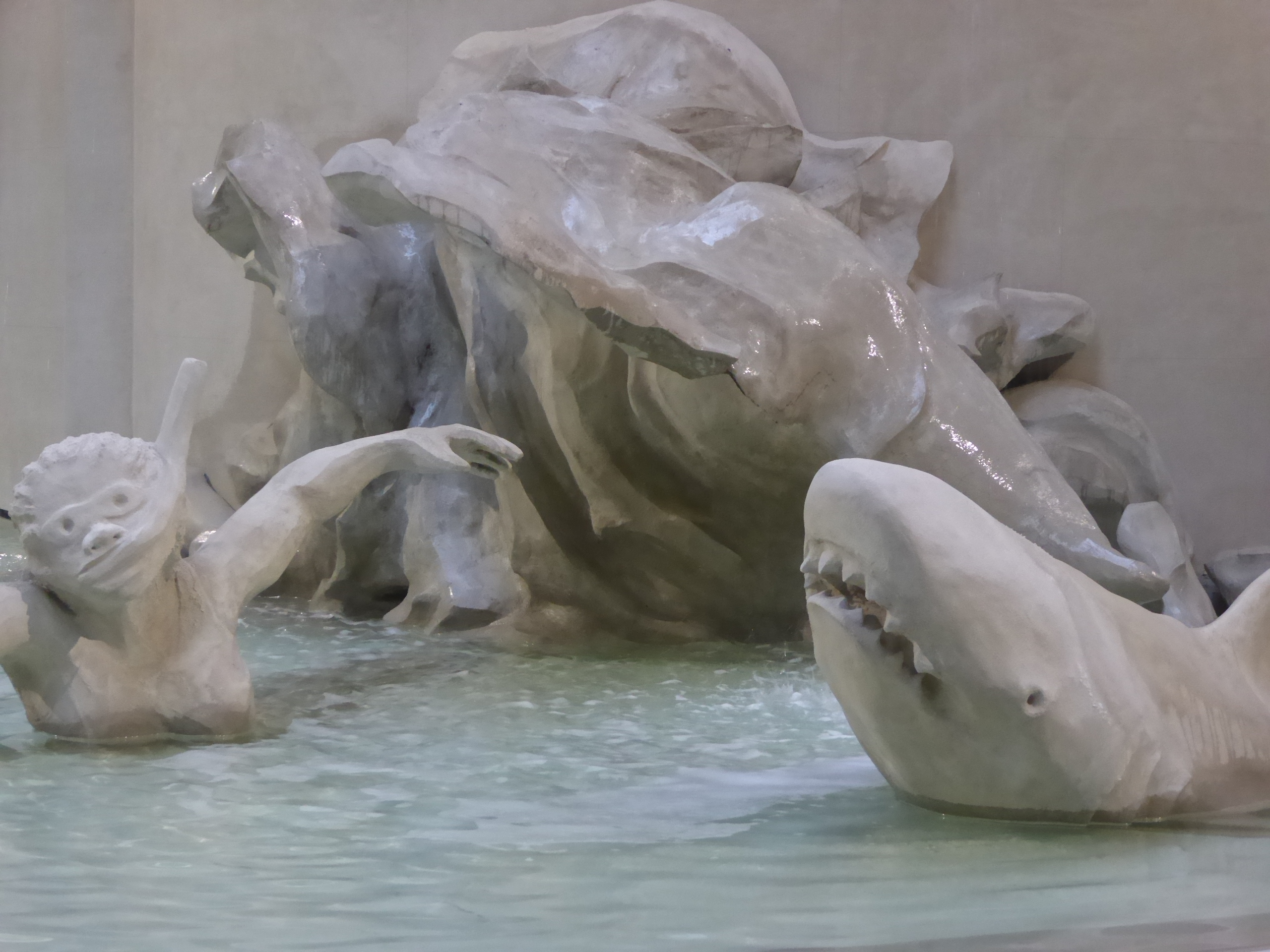
Fons Americanus (2020)

The statues on the fountain deal with the slave trade and the impact of European settlement and exploitation on Africa and in the Caribbean. Walker has indicated that the Victoria Memorial on The Mall inspired her work; like Fons Americanus, the memorial includes allegorical statues, figures, and scenes.

Many of the sculptures on the fountain allude to other artistic works and to historical events. These include paintings such as John Singleton Copley's Watson and the Shark and Winslow Homer's The Gulf Stream.

=== Critical reception ===
In a review for the Financial Times, Rachel Spence praised the work for "[rising] to the challenge" of the Turbine Hall. She further praised the use of water due to the noise it provides, comparing it favorably to "sound art" reliant on audio recordings.

=== In popular culture ===
The 2021 music video for "Don't Judge Me" by FKA twigs, Headie One, and Fred again.. featured Fons Americanus in several scenes. Co-director Emmanuel Adjei said, "In this audio-visual document we get to witness artists FKA twigs and Headie One, amongst other Black British influentials, fighting against invisible forces of judgement and oppression. Having the enormous Victorian-inspired fountain Fons Americanus by visual artist Kara Walker—depicting the historical, sorrowful story of slavery and colonization—as our setting, and particularly as the spirit of the film, this important monument creates another layer of depth and meaning to an invisible yet shared history."
