= Nexus Press =

Former publishing company

- Industry: Artist book publishing
- Founded: 1978; 48 years ago
- Founder: Michael Goodman
- Headquarters: Atlanta, Georgia, United States
- Key people: Joe Anne Paschall

Nexus Press was a nonprofit fine arts press based in Atlanta, Georgia, active from 1978 to 2003, known for publishing artists' books. Joanna Drucker's The Century of Artists' Books described Nexus as a major center for their production, with "an unqualified commitment to publishing artists' books." In its 26-year run, the press produced and published over 200 original works.

== History ==
Nexus Press was started by a group of photographers calling themselves the Nexus Art Collective who ran a cooperative gallery in a storefront on Virginia Avenue which has since become the Atlanta Contemporary Art Center (ACAC). In 1976, the group launched a publication arm which became Nexus Press.

Michael Goodman became the founding director of the press in 1977, remaining there until 1992, and also produced How to Make an Artist's Book (Nexus Press, 1980), a "droll" and "wry" work about the making of artists' books. Joe Anne Paschall joined the press in 1986 and became director in 1994.

1977 was the year the Nexus Collective received three simultaneous grants from the National Endowment for the Arts, the Georgia Council for the Arts, and the City of Atlanta's Bureau of Cultural Affairs. These grants allowed them to move to an empty public school building on Forrest Avenue, where there was space for printing equipment. Their first press was a "Hamada Star." When this press wore out in 1986, the press used donation money and funds raised through an auction to purchase a Heidelberg press.

A major turning point in the press' success was their 1980 publication of a monograph of P. H. Polk. The publication and its exhibition received national attention, including coverage in LIFE. It established Nexus' reputation as a force in photographic publishing. Another significant point was Nexus' program developed as part of the 1996 Cultural Olympiad, for which an artists from each of the areas represented by the Olympic rings produced a book. This produced collaborations with Japanese artist Shinro Ohtake, Ivorian artist Frédéric Bruly Bouabré, Spanish artist Darya von Berner, Brazilian artist Fernando Lopes, and Canadian artist Shelagh Keeley.

The press was incredibly successful, producing beautiful and experimental works, including into 2001 when they were represented at the Frankfurt Book Fair and made their annual $40,000 quota in six months. However, in 2003, ACAC shut down the press in a controversial and abrupt decision.

== Publications ==
Nexus Press pushed creative boundaries, producing books, posters, and flyers in traditional formats as well as accordions, flip books, maps, pop-up books, scrolls, cootie catchers, and piano rolls. Their subjectmatter often touched on topics such as race, gender, sexuality, and American history.

Artists published by Nexus include Bill Burke, P. H. Polk, Ray Metzker, Robert Cumming, Joan Lyons, Ruth Laxson, Beverly Buchanan, Pat Steir, Ellen Banks, and Larry Walker.

== Legacy ==
Nexus publications are held in major collections worldwide, including the Museum of Modern Art, the Whitney Museum of American Art, the Victoria and Albert Museum, and the Rijksmuseum, in addition to many college and university special and research collections.

A decade after the press was closed, two ACAC staff members, Rachel Reese and Veronica Kessenich, were given permission to explore the old press building and its archive. What ensued was an exhibition at ACAC in 2015, "Endless Road: A Look at Nexus Press." An exhibition of archival material has also been held in the Robert W. Woodruff Library at Emory University, "The World Between Word and Image: Artists’ Books and Archives from Atlanta Contemporary Art Center, Nexus Contemporary Art Center, and Nexus Press."

There have also been attempts to digitize the archive, as with "allnexus.press," a site with images and publishing information for "a comprehensive collection of Nexus Press books," the work of Jaye Fishel, website builder Elsa Brown, and photographer Amy von Harrington, using funding provided by the Art Libraries Society of North America.

An archive of Nexus Press books is now housed in the Atlanta Special Collections library at the Savannah College of Art and Design (SCAD). According to SCAD, the presence of Nexus in Atlanta was key for the formation of their libraries. Other records from 1973 to 2005 are now in the Stuart A. Rose Manuscript, Archives, and Rare Book Library at Emory University.
