= Emmanuel Adjei =

Ghanaian-Dutch film director and visual artist

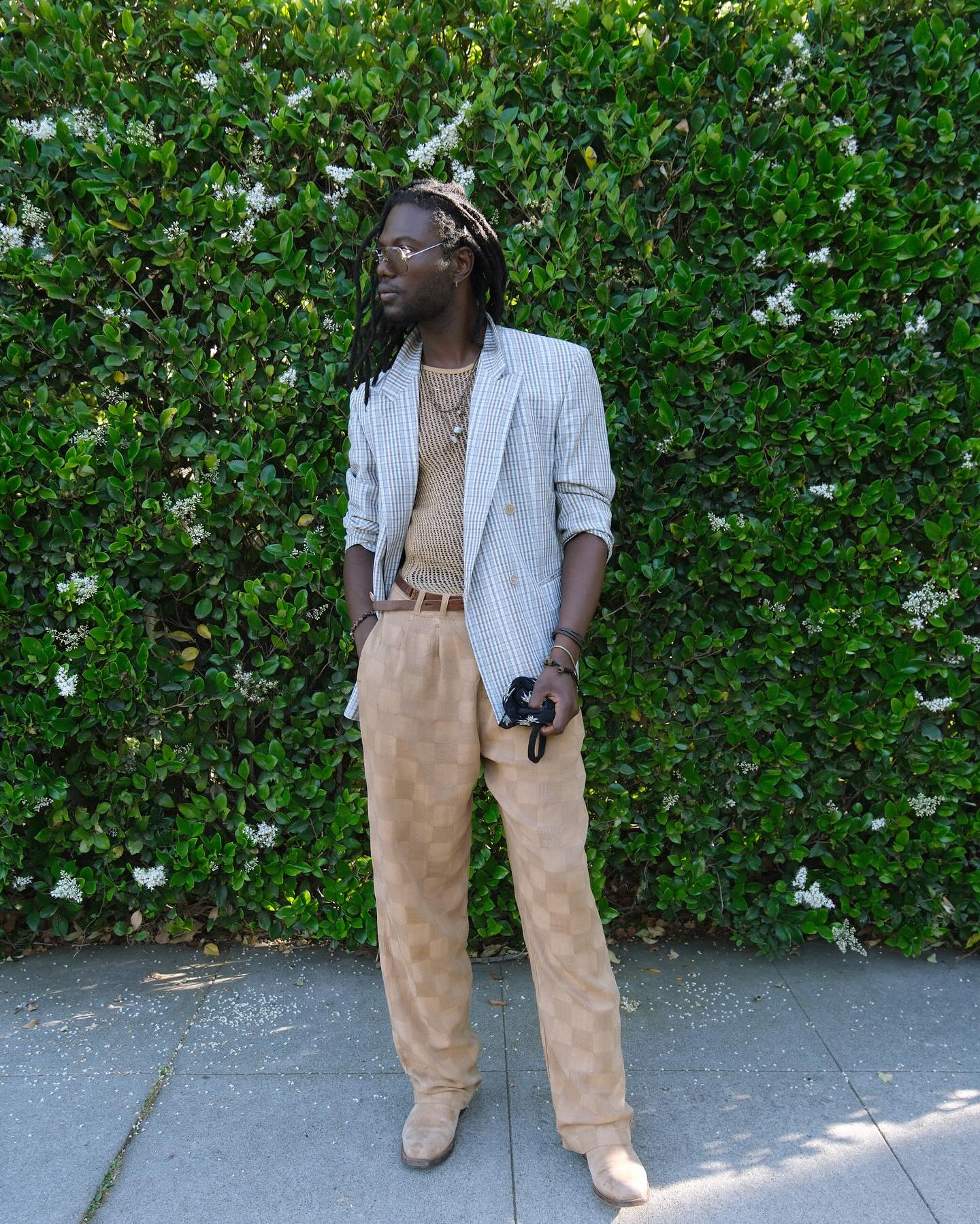
- Born: 9 October 1988 (age 37); Amsterdam, The Netherlands
- Occupations: filmmaker; visual artist; creative director
- Notable work: Cowboy Carter Renaissance Black Is King
- Website: www.emmanueladjei.com

Emmanuel Kwasi Adjei is a Ghanaian-Dutch film director, creative director, and visual artist. Adjei was featured as co-director of Black Is King, the acclaimed musical film and visual album by American singer Beyoncé, which premiered on Disney+, July 31, 2020. He also served as a key creative director on Beyoncé's subsequent landmark projects Renaissance and Cowboy Carter album and tour, contributing to their visual and creative direction at Parkwood Entertainment.

Alongside British singer FKA twigs, Adjei directed the music video for Don't Judge Me, released on January 26, 2021, which featured the Tate Modern commissioned sculpture Fons Americanus by American contemporary artist Kara Walker.

He directed the global campaign film Alien Goddess for French fashion house Mugler, released on August 29, 2021, starring American musician Willow Smith and with music by Icelandic musician and visual artist Bjork.

Adjei was appointed by American rapper, record executive, and media proprietor Jay-Z, his wife Beyoncé, and the American retail and luxury company Tiffany & Co, to direct the film to the global campaign About Love, which premiered on September 13, 2021. The Carters' love story is illuminated by the Tiffany Yellow Diamond and set against the backdrop of Jean-Michel Basquiat's Equals Pi (1982). The film also features a musical performance of the song "Moon River." Made famous in the 1961 film Breakfast at Tiffany's, the tune is reimagined with vocals by Beyoncé.

Adjei's directing career has been marked by successful collaborations with a variety of recording artists such as Madonna, Beyoncé, Mark Pritchard, Mykki Blanco, and Sevdaliza.

== Education ==
Adjei graduated with a degree in Fine Art from the Utrecht School of the Arts in the Netherlands, before securing a talent scholarship to attend the Royal Academy of Fine Arts in Ghent, Belgium, where he studied Audiovisual Arts and Film. During this time, he discovered his passion for experimental cinema and video installation. In 2013 and 2014, Adjei was awarded a Young Talent grant from the Mondriaan Fund to develop his artistic practice.

== Awards ==
Adjei was nominated a Grammy Award for Best Music Film and an NAACP Image Award for Outstanding Directing in a Television Movie for his work on Black Is King.

In 2021, Adjei and co-director FKA Twigs won Best Music Video at Raindance Film Festival for Don't Judge Me.
