= Ari Marcopoulos =

American photographer and filmmaker (born 1957)

- Born: Aristos; 1957 (age 68–69); Amsterdam, Netherlands
- Occupations: Photographer; filmmaker; artist
- Years active: 1980–present
- Known for: Hip-hop photography; Skateboard culture documentation; Snowboard culture photography
- Spouses: Jennifer Goode (divorced) Kara Walker (m. 2025)
- Children: 2

Ari Marcopoulos (born Aristos) is an American self-taught photographer, adventurer and film artist. Born in the Netherlands, he is best known for presenting work showcasing elusive subcultures, including artists, snowboarders and musicians. He lives and works in New York. Marcopoulos is represented by Fergus McCaffery in New York and Tokyo, and Galerie Frank Elbaz in Paris.

== Early life ==
Marcopoulos was born in Amsterdam, The Netherlands, in 1957. His father, who was of Greek origin, was born in Egypt. He became a pilot and moved to The Netherlands to work for KLM. In The Netherlands, he met a young Dutch model who would become Marcopoulos's mother. His parents had three sons, including Ari, and one daughter.

Marcopoulos moved to New York City in 1980 when he was 23 years old. it was there that he was first exposed to the burgeoning hip-hop and downtown art scenes of 1980s New York. The reasoning behind his move included cultural frustrations in his home country. Marcopoulos recalls, "...in Holland, things were pretty stale for me. Even though there were a lot of good influences and a certain openness to music and art and literature, I just wanted to go somewhere less familiar–somewhere bigger. Holland is a fairly small country, and in a weird way, somewhat conservative... There isn't much flexibility in changing people's perspectives."

After emigrating to the United States, Marcopoulos was first hired as a printing assistant to Andy Warhol. Two years later, he became an assistant to photographer Irving Penn. He soon became a part of the downtown arts scene that included artists such as Jean-Michel Basquiat, Keith Haring, and Robert Mapplethorpe. Marcopoulos credits Warhol with teaching him the value of photographing everyday objects and people, and Penn for showing him the power of a simple approach to photography.

== Work and career ==
Family and friends have been both sources of inspiration and subject-matter throughout his career as a photographer. His landscapes and portraiture offer takes on everyday life and the creativity of people in the margins.

=== Hip-hop culture ===
Once Marcopoulos moved to New York City, he began to photograph the locals he encountered in the street, which exposed him to the up-and-coming downtown artist and hip-hop scenes of the 1980s. There he met and photographed portraits of pioneering rap icons including The Fat Boys, the Beastie Boys, Rakim, Public Enemy, Ratking and LL Cool J.

His photo documentation of the Beastie Boys touring and recording between their albums, Check Your Head and III Communication can be found in his book, Pass The Mic: Beastie Boys 1991-1996.

Marcopoulos's best known hip-hop collaboration was shooting the cover photo for American rapper Jay-Z's twelfth studio album, Magna Carta Holy Grail in 2013. The cover photo features the marble statue of Alpheus and Arethusa by Florentine sculptor Battista Loenzi.

=== Skater culture ===
In the early 1990s, Marcopulos met and befriended skaters cycling at the legendary local spot dubbed "The Banks" found underneath the Brooklyn Bridge. He shot portraits of New York skate icons Harold Hunter and Justin Pierce, both featured in Larry Clark's 1995 coming-of-age film Kids.

He has frequently collaborated with the skateboarding fashion label, Supreme. The brand has created several collections of hooded sweatshirts, t-shirts, Vans sneakers, and hats that have featured Marcopoulos's photography.

In 2017, Marcopoulos collaborated with Adidas Skateboarding to release a limited footwear and apparel collection featuring his photographs from the '90s.

=== Snowboard culture ===
In 1995, Marcopoulos was contacted by Burton Snowboards to shoot their new snowboarding catalogue. Despite not knowing how to ski or snowboard, the photographer agreed to the project and taught himself how to snowboard. The artist stated his experience, "I didn't approach [snowboarding] as a sport, I approached it as a lifestyle," he says. "That's what I liked about snowboarding – a bunch of kids travelling around the world in their own community. They were just living their own life without their parents around – a community of people living and working together and seeing each other in different places."

=== Books ===
Marcopoulos has published over 200 books and limited edition zines as well as books in collaboration with artists like Fumes with Matthew Barney, an in-depth look at Barney's studio process captured through photographs shot over the course of four years and "the Ecstasy of St. Kara" with Kara Walker.

In 2019, Marcopoulos continued his collaboration with Gucci with his book Dapper Dan's Harlem, which featured original photography of the neighborhood, as well as portraits of friends of Gucci and Dapper Dan, including director and designer Trevor Andrew, artist and author Cleo Wade, restaurateur and chef Marcus Samuelsson, and businessman and author Steve Stoute.

== Exhibitions ==
Marcopoulos's first mid-career survey in 2009 was curated by Stephanie Cannizzo for the Berkeley Art Museum and Pacific Film Archive in Berkeley, California.

Marcopoulos has been a featured artist in the 2002 and 2010 Whitney Biennial.

=== Solo exhibitions ===
- 2005-2006: Ari Marcopoulos, MoMA PS1, New York
- 2008: Ari MAarcopoulos: Fear God, The Project, New York
- 2009: Ari Marcopoulos: Within Arm's Reach, Berkeley Art Museum & Pacific Film Archive, Berkeley
- 2011: Ari Marcopoulos: Abandoned Sleep, Ratio 3, San Francisco
- 2011: Ari Marcopoulos, White Columns, New York
- 2011: Ari Marcopoulos: This Week, Galerie Franz Elbaz, Paris
- 2015: Ari Marcopoulos: L1032015, Marlborough, New York
- 2017: Ari Marcopoulos: Machine, Galerie Frank Elbaz, Paris
- 2017: Ari Marcopoulos: Machine, Fondation d'Entreprise Ricard, Paris
- 2019: Ari Marcopoulos. Films. Photographs., Fergus McCaffrey, New York
- 2019: Ari Marcopoulos. 3 Films. 3 Photographs., Fergus McCaffrey, Tokyo

== Filmography ==
=== Short films ===
Year	Title	Synopsis
2017-2018	The Park	Marcopoulos reveals the woven dynamics of public parks with the lives of New Yorkers by capturing moments found at a basketball court next to the Walt Whitman housing projects in Fort Greene, Brooklyn.
2018	Monogram Hunters	Marcopoulos goes inside the lives of the Monogram Hunters, a Mardi Gras Indian tribe, to learn more about the history and impact of their tribe in New Orleans' Seventh Ward.
2018	Upper Big Tracadie	Marcopoulos visits the small town of Upper Big Tracadie, located in the Canadian province of Nova Scotia. The community was founded by freed American slaves who arrived to Canada in the 18th century.

=== Music videos ===
- 1992: Beastie Boys, "Gratitude", Check Your Head
- 1992: Beastie Boys, "Something's Got To Give", Check Your Head
- 2013: Ratking, "Piece of Shit"
- 2014: Ratking, "Canal"

== Books (selection) ==
- 1987: Portraits from the studio and the street
- 2000: Transitions and exits
- 2001: Pass the mic : Beastie Boys, 1991-1996
- 2005: Out & about
- 2005: Even the president of the United States sometimes has got to stand naked
- 2007: Ad Rock
- 2008: The chance is higher
- 2009: Ari Marcopoulos: within arm's reach: [exhibition]
- 2015: Fumes: Ari Marcopoulos, Matthew Barney Studio
- 2016: Rome - Malibu
- 2016: Ari Marcopoulos: not yet
- 2018: The Athens dialogues

== Personal life ==
Marcopoulos has two sons, Cairo and Ethan, from his previous marriage to Jennifer Goode. Both sons have been prominently featured in Marcopoulos's photography.

He married American contemporary artist Kara Walker in New York in 2025.

Marcopoulos lives in New York City.
