= A Subtlety =

2014 Kara Walker installation

Coordinates: 40°42′52″N 73°58′03″W

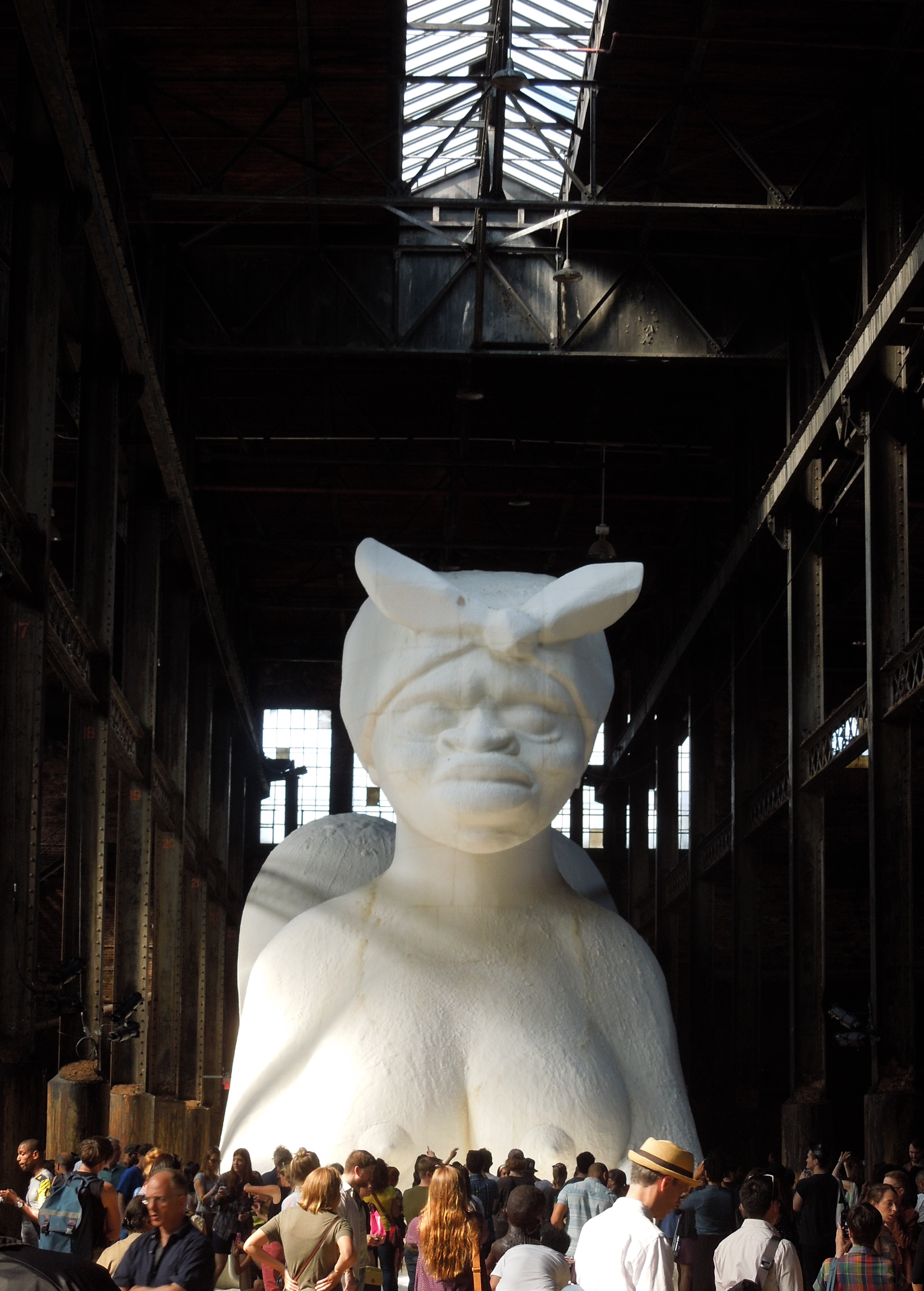
- At the Behest of Creative Time, Kara E. Walker has Confected: A Subtlety, or the Marvelous Sugar Baby, an Homage to the unpaid and overworked Artisans who have refined our Sweet tastes from the cane fields to the Kitchens of the New World on the Occasion of the demolition of the Domino Sugar Refining Plant
- Artist: Kara Walker
- Year: 2014
- Medium: Sugar, polystyrene, plastic, molasses
- Location: Brooklyn, New York, U.S., New York City

A Subtlety... (subtitled or the Marvelous Sugar Baby, an Homage to the unpaid and overworked Artisans who have refined our Sweet tastes from the cane fields to the Kitchens of the New World on the Occasion of the demolition of the Domino Sugar Refining Plant) is a 2014 installation artwork by American artist Kara Walker. A Subtlety... was dominated by its central white sculpture depicting a woman with African features in the shape of a sphinx, but also included fifteen other sculptures. These fifteen "attendants" were enlarged versions of contemporary blackamoor figurines.

Commissioned by Creative Time and underwritten by New York-based real estate development company Two Trees, the piece was installed in the Domino Sugar Refinery in the Williamsburg neighborhood of Brooklyn from May through July 2014. Although thematically consistent with Walker's earlier work, its scope and presentation were departures from her oeuvre.

Built with donated materials, the exhibition sparked conversations about the show's audience, the gentrification of Brooklyn, and the work's themes of race, sexuality, oppression, labor, and the ephemeral.

== Development and presentation ==
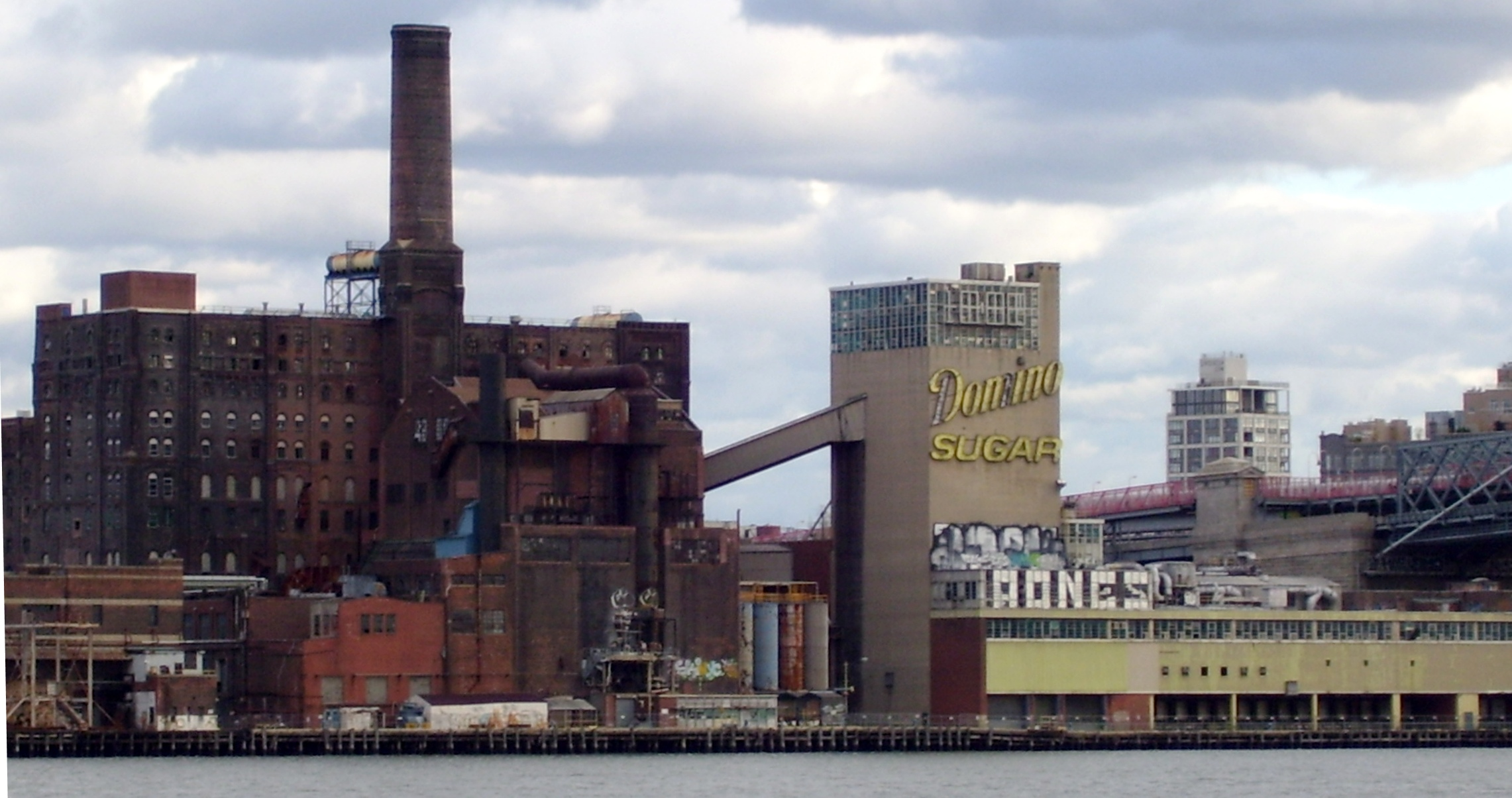
Domino Sugar Refinery buildings in 2010

=== Background ===
The Domino Sugar Refinery site is owned by real estate developer Two Trees, and the bulk of the facility had been slated for demolition as part of the redevelopment. Anne Pasternak, then-president of Creative Time, reached out to Jed Walentas, Two Trees's CEO and a board member of Creative Time about a show on the site. The arts nonprofit approached Walker roughly a year before the exhibition selecting Walker whom they "had been trying to get her to sign on to a public artwork for many years" due to "the obvious historic connections between her work and the site." Walker was attracted to the project in part because of the plant's history and the evidence of the work done there, such as molasses still covering the facility's walls.

Lead financial project support was given by the National Endowment for the Arts and Walker's gallery, Sikkema Jenkins & Co. Creative Time and Walker kept details about the project secret from the press. Production required several months of work and a team of 26 with six volunteers.

=== Conception and construction ===
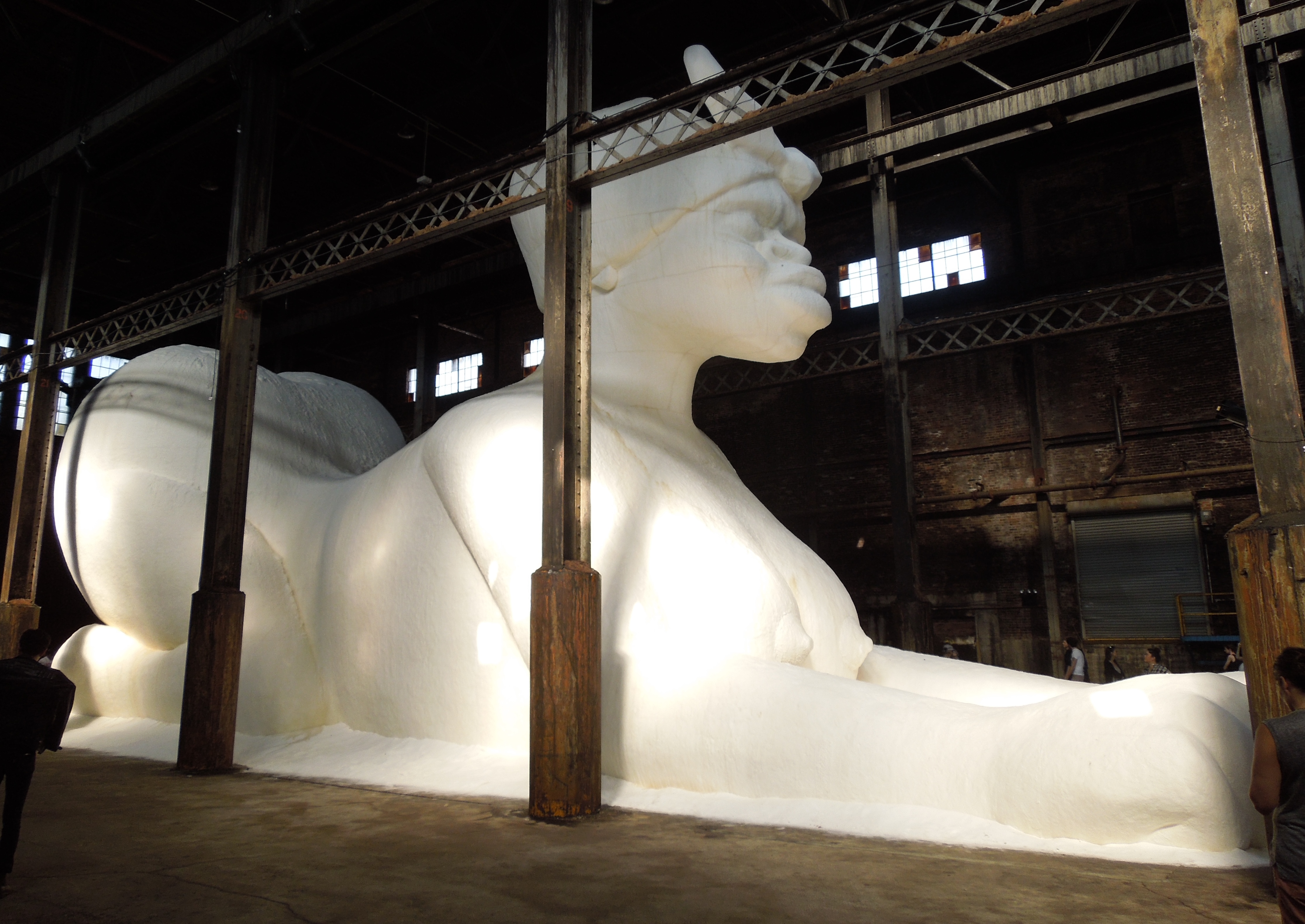
Sideview of sculpture, May 25, 2014

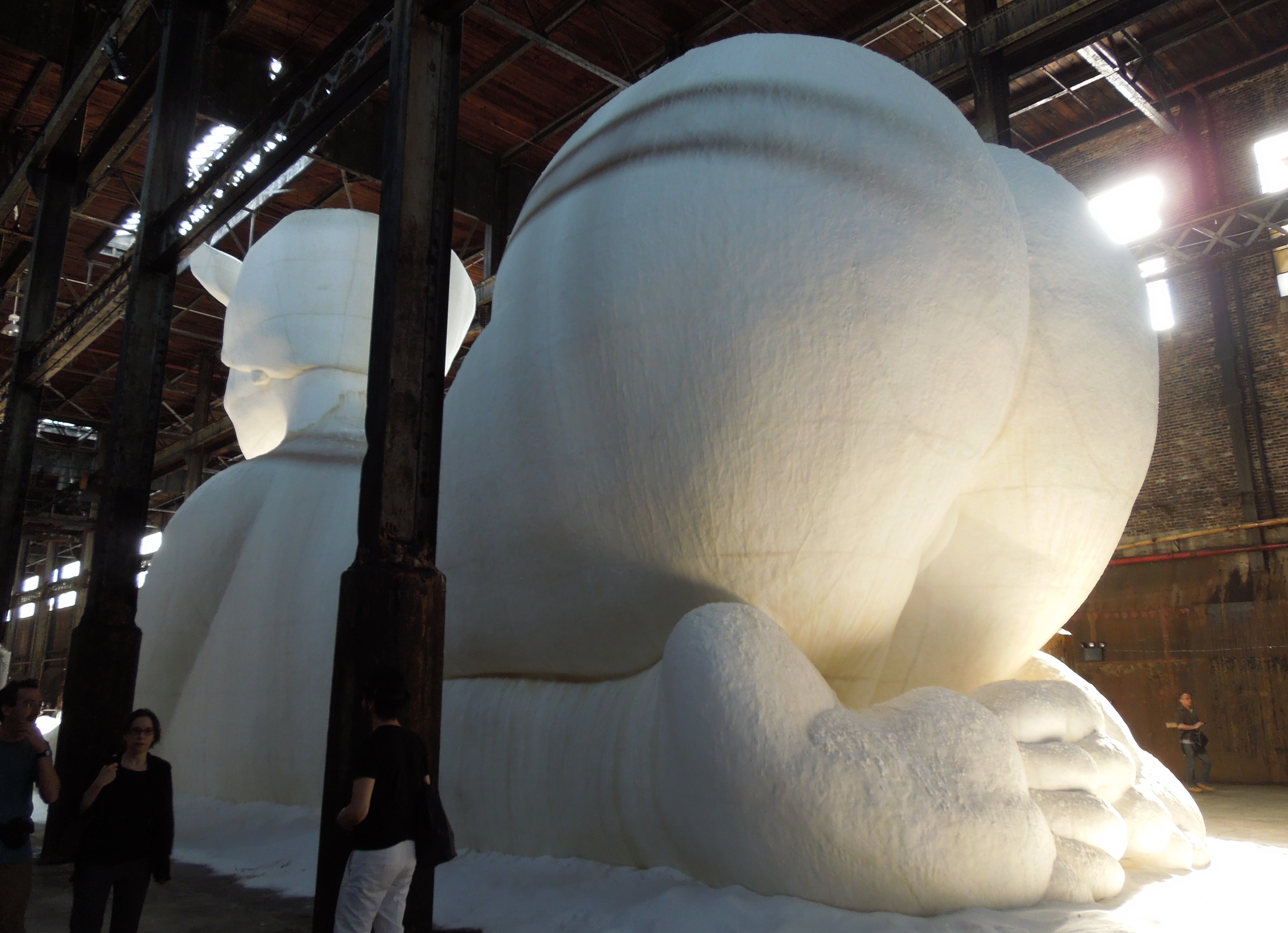
Rearview of sculpture, May 25, 2014

Walker first sketched a drawing of the sphinx, which was passed onto a production team. This team created a physical mock-up of the sphinx and uploaded a 3D version to manipulate using a computer. Upon completion, the sphinx was approximately 75 feet long and 35 feet tall, and was constructed from 330 polystyrene blocks donated by the Insulation Corporation of America. Domino Sugar donated roughly 162,000 pounds (approximately 80 tons) of sugar for the sphinx's "skin". The team used roughly half the donated sugar, and applied it to the underlying structure by hand and shovel. The polystyrene was recycled after the exhibit closed, though the sugar was not.

The blackamoors were based on ceramic figurines found by Walker on Amazon.com and were altered and enlarged for the show. Five of the fifteen were made of solid sugar. The remaining ten, with five holding baskets with bananas and five with baskets held on their backs, were first built from sugar. However, they collapsed under the heat, and were replaced with versions made of resin and coated in a layer of molasses. Each statue weighed between 300 and 500 pounds.

== Sculptures and exhibition ==
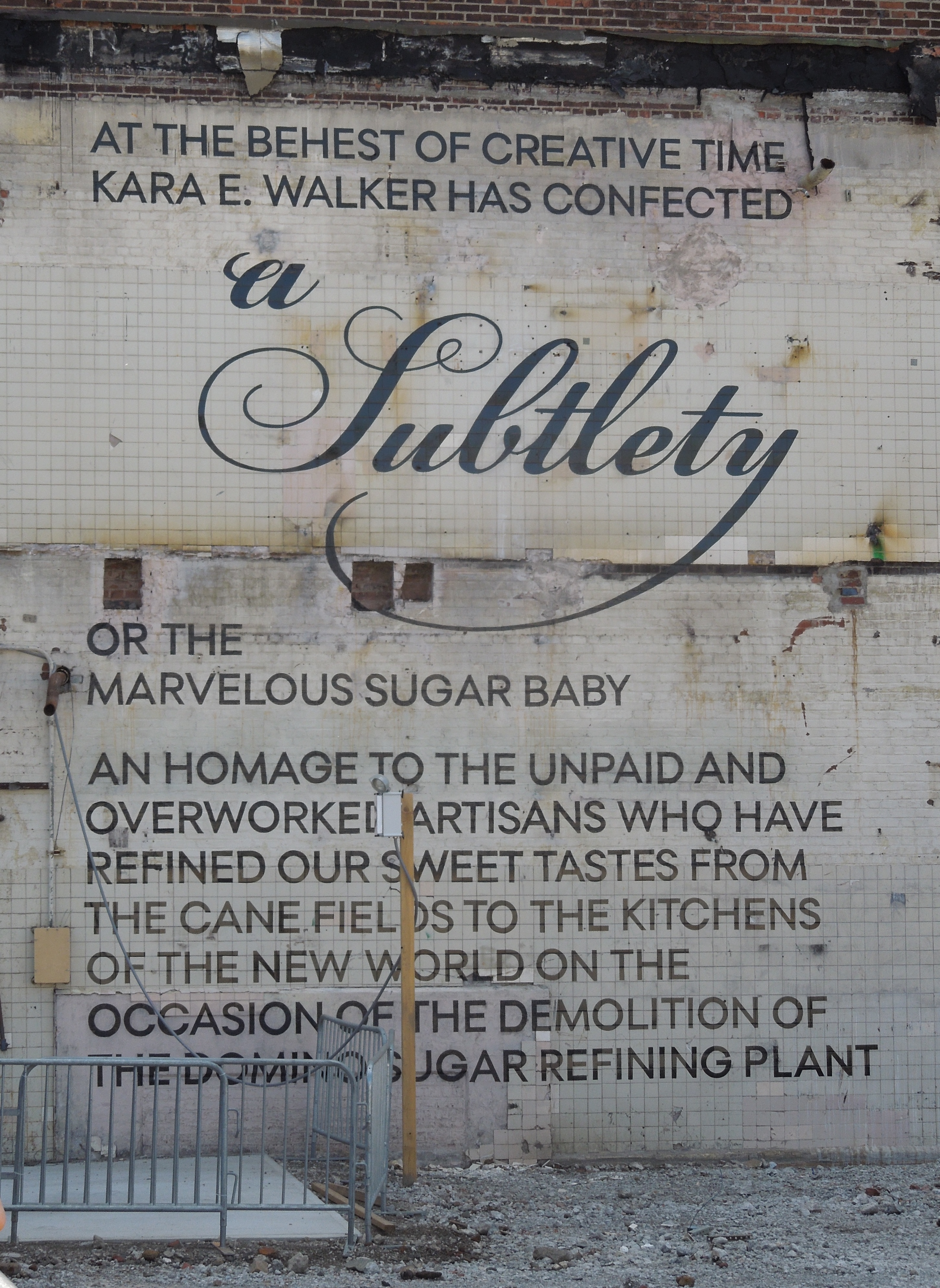
Exterior of a Subtletly at the Domino Sugar Refinery

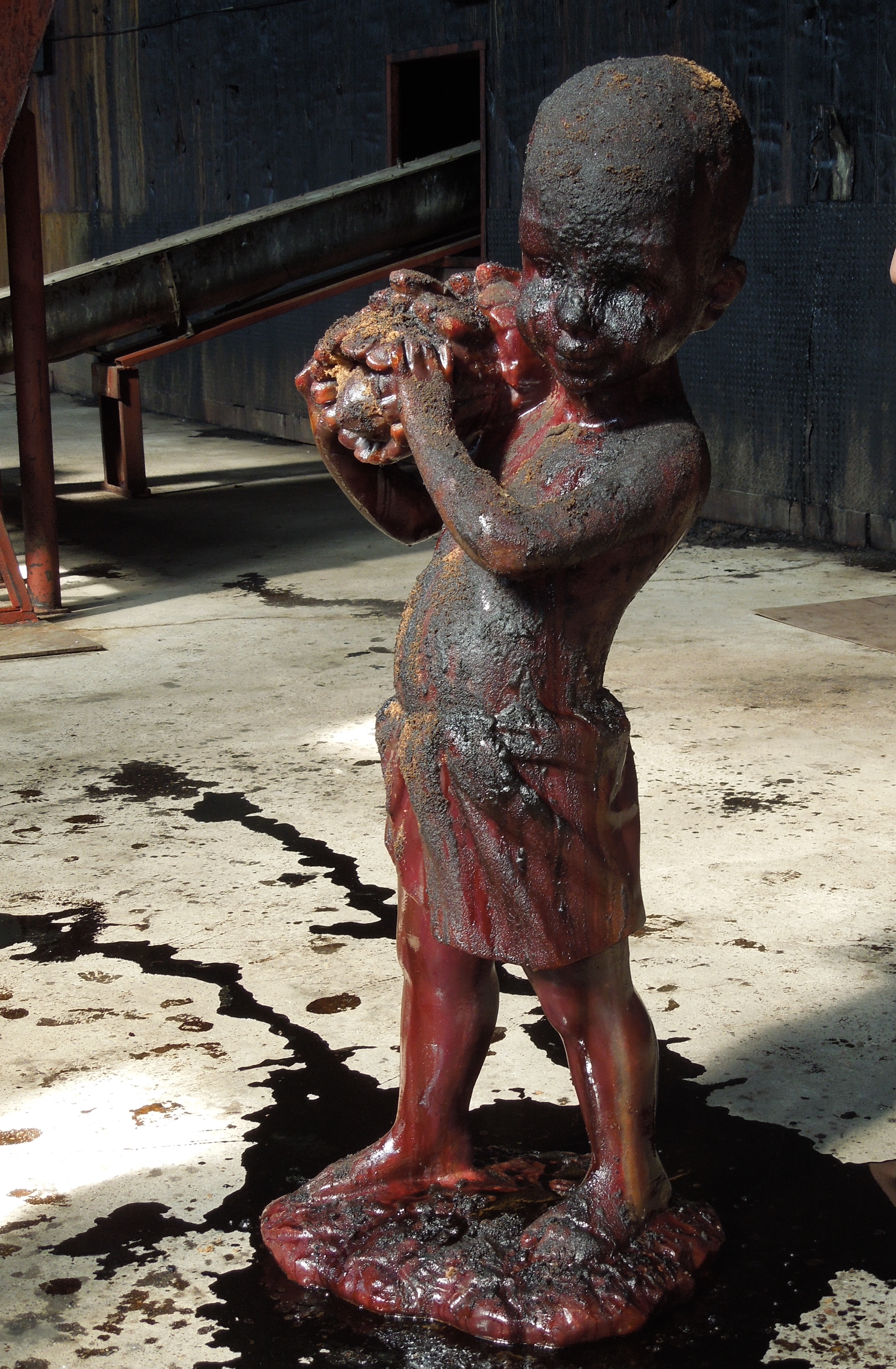
Attendant of a Subtletly at the Domino Sugar Refinery

Walker is best known for her silhouettes depicting stylized scenes from the Antebellum South. Although thematically similar to earlier works, the sphinx and whole installation was a break with Walker's earlier work in terms of its scale. The name of the exhibit, A Subtlety, is a reference to sugar sculptures used as decoration or food in aristocratic European households during the Middle Ages known as subtleties in English-speaking countries.

The sphinx's features evoke stereotypical depictions of the Southern Mammy archetype. Consistent with this archetype, the sphinx appears to be overweight and wears a kerchief. Walker's choice to depict a mammy was in part inspired by a "Mammy memorial" once proposed for construction in the District of Columbia. Walker told documentary nonprofit, Art21, "'Kara Walker's work deals with history.' Embedded in the statement 'Kara Walker is dealing with history' is the desire for a hero who can fix this problem of our history and racism. And I don't think that my work is actually effectively dealing with history. I think of my work as kind of subsumed by history or consumed by history."

A Subtlety was installed in the refinery's Syrup Shed and was open to the public from May 10, to July 6, 2014 on Fridays, Saturdays, and Sundays. Entrance to the exhibit required signing a waiver due to the asbestos and lead found in the structure, which was inhaled by those attending. Editorials noted the overwhelmingly white makeup of the audience. Attendees were encouraged to post photographs to social media platform Instagram using the hashtag #karawalkerdomino to presumably build a virtual 3D version of the piece.

== Reception ==
A Subtlety was received with varying opinions. Jamilah King, writing for ColorLines wrote "[I]t's reassuring that so many white people have a vested – or at least passing – interest in consuming art that deals with race. At the same time I found it unsettling to view art by a black artist about racism in an audience that's mostly white." This audience formed a major aspect of this controversial piece by posting insensitive posts including "jokes about the sphinx’s vagina or gag pictures where the subject pretends to pinch [the sphinx's] ass" as well as a general insensitivity as pointed out by Indypendent writer Nicholas Powers, by those in the audience not found at other sites commemorating tragedies, such as the September 11 Memorial. Powers further wrote

What is the responsibility of the artist? Is it different for a Black artist who creates in the midst of political struggle? I first saw Walker’s work more than a decade ago in Boston and remember studying her panorama of black silhouettes.... Standing there, I admired her technical ability and her vision, her ability to force us to read the suppression of real violence under an epoch’s ideology. And yet, I wondered even then if exposing the details of Black victimization was truly freeing if it simply triggered the pain of people of color, and in the precarious atmosphere of the nearly all-white art world at that.

New York-based artists Salome Asega, Sable Elyse Smith, and Ariana Allensworth,, and art producer Taja Cheek organized a visit to the site for people of color who might otherwise have felt uncomfortable in the space given the behavior of the audience and the lack of structured guidance by Creative Time. Members of the gathering, dubbing themselves "The Kara Walker Experience: We Are Here," wore white and distributed informational pamphlets and stickers reading "We Are Here" to those participating.

After the close of the exhibit, Walker said that she had anticipated white audience reactions and that she secretly recorded some of it for a future work.

A month later Frieze named the work No. 3 of "The 25 Best Works of the 21st Century". The magazine quoted Pasternak reflecting "[Walker] told NPR at the time that the work was ‘about trying to get a grasp on history’. But it was also a twisted trap, one that made it impossible to turn away from historic attitudes towards the Black female body." The work appeared in the 204th episode of Art21 in 2015.

== Disassembly and further exhibition ==
After the end of the exhibit, the sphinx was disassembled in a process that took a week. Walker did not participate in the disassembly, and spent time at her home in Massachusetts after the show ended. One piece of the sphinx, the left hand, was retained and shown in November 2014 at Sikkema Jenkins, the gallery which represents Walker. According to her, the hand is stored in either “New Jersey or Long Island". It was shown on the Greek island of Hydra in the summer of 2017.
