= Atlanta Contemporary Art Center =

American gallery

Atlanta Contemporary
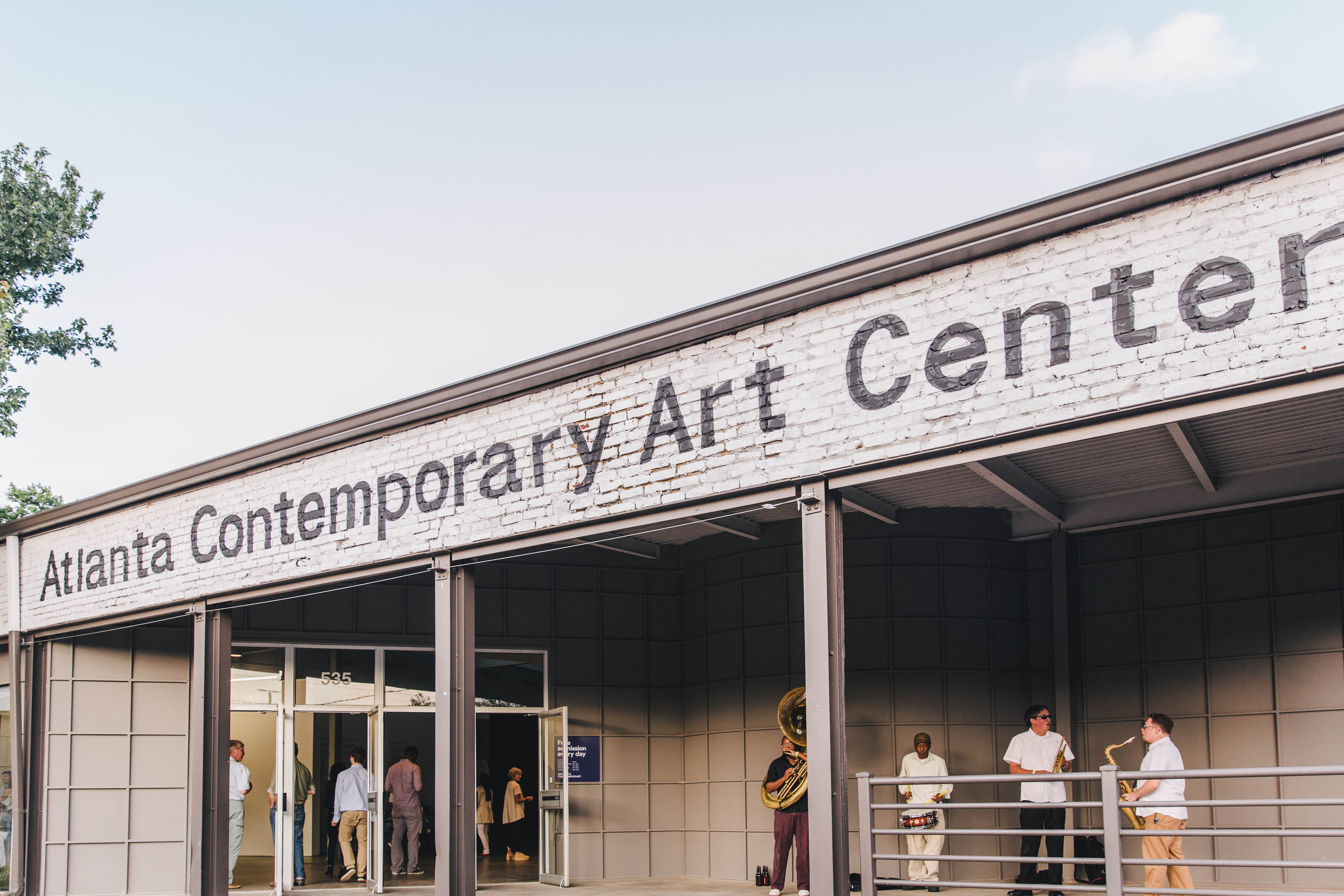

- Location within Atlanta
- Established: 1973 (current location since 1989)
- Location: 535 Means Street NW; Atlanta; United States
- Coordinates: 33.762106°N 84.391468°W
- Website: www.atlantacontemporary.org

Atlanta Contemporary is a non-profit, non-collecting institution located in the West Midtown district of Atlanta. It is dedicated to the creation, presentation, and advancement of contemporary art by emerging and established artists.

Atlanta Contemporary presents multiple exhibitions per year featuring local and international artists, including commissioning new works. It pays particular attention to artists of note who have not had a significant exhibition in the Southeast. It organizes educational programs, as well as provides on-site, subsidized studio space to local artists through its Studio Artist Program.

== History ==
Founded in 1973 by a group of Atlanta photographers, Atlanta Contemporary was originally called Nexus and began as a store-front cooperative gallery supported by member dues and staffed by volunteers. In 1976, the organization leased an old elementary school and began to expand its programs, formalize its infrastructure, and house a number of resident organizations. In 1984, the name was changed to Nexus Contemporary Art Center to reflect the organization's mission and role in the community. Nexus Press, a fine arts press known best for its artists' books, was founded, and studio spaces for artists became a core part of the organization.

In 1987, seeking a permanent home, the board completed a $1.95 million capital campaign to renovate a 35,000 square-foot warehouse complex on Means Street near the Georgia Tech campus. In 1989, the organization began a phased renovation program. Completed in 1994, Nexus became a catalyst for urban renewal in the historic industrial district of the Westside.

In 2000, Nexus was renamed Atlanta Contemporary Art Center. Locally known as The Contemporary, it became one of thirty-one organizations selected in 1999 to participate in the multiyear Warhol Initiative, receiving a grant from The Andy Warhol Foundation for the Visual Arts to undertake long-term institutional planning. In 2003, Nexus Press closed, having produced more than 150 titles.

A rebranding effort shortened the institution's name in 2015. Known today as Atlanta Contemporary, it continues to play a role in Westside community-based initiatives. In 2009, it helped found the Westside Arts District, featuring monthly Saturday art walks with educational programming coordinated among the district's art spaces.

== Shop ==
Atlanta Contemporary has a retail shop that specializes in artist-made and locally produced merchandise such as art books, including Nexus Press Books, exhibition catalogues, artist-made jewelry and artist multiples, as well as rare recordings.

== See also ==
- High Museum of Art
- Museum of Contemporary Art of Georgia
- List of contemporary art museums
