= Scott Joplin (painting) =

1982 painting by Ellen Banks

- Artist: Ellen Banks
- Year: 1982
- Medium: Acrylic on canvas
- Dimensions: 184.15 cm × 123.19 cm (72.50 in × 48.50 in)
- Location: Addison Gallery of American Art, Andover

Scott Joplin is a painting by Ellen Banks. It is in the collection of the Addison Gallery of American Art in Andover, Massachusetts, in the United States.

The painting comprises acrylic paint on canvas. It is part of a series of paintings by Banks that depicts abstract musical scores by notable musicians. Scott Joplin depicts a piano score by Scott Joplin. The painting was completed by Banks in 1982 and purchased by the Addison Gallery in 1983. It has been exhibited twice at the Addison Gallery, in 1983 and 1988.
