= Ellen Banks =

American painter

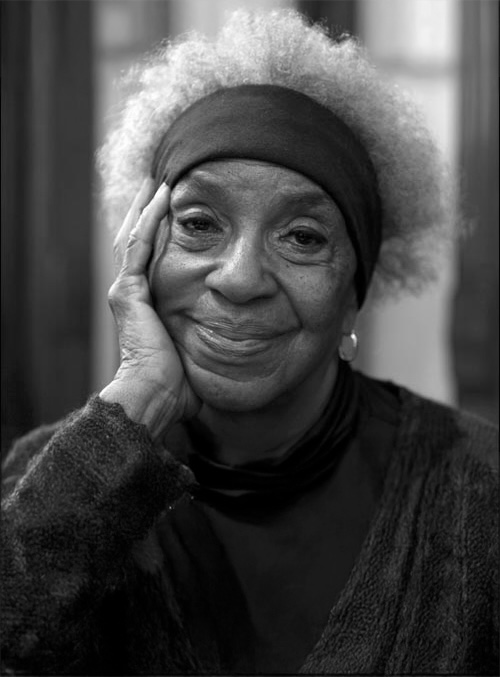

Ellen Banks (June 7, 1938 – May 18, 2017), also known as Ellen Banks Feld or Ellen Feld (married to Bernard Feld), was an American painter and musician. Her work is characterized by a unique interplay between visual art and written music, especially the visual translation of musical scores into multimedia compositions on canvas, wood, handmade paper or textiles. She was based in Brooklyn for much of her career. She died in 2017 due to recessive cancer. Her artistic legacy is being managed by the Ellen Banks Archive in Berlin Spandau, Germany.

She refers to herself as "a representational painter of abstracts forms," and her unique work has been featured in galleries across the United States and Europe including Galerie Spandow, Artu Gallery, and the San Francisco Museum of Modern Art. She taught painting courses at the School of the Museum of Fine Art in Boston (1974–1996), and garnered a number of awards and grant funding including a Ford Foundation grant in 1979, a Bunting fellowship from Radcliff College, Cambridge, Massachusetts, a Painting Grant from the National Endowment for the Arts, and a Book Grant from Nexus Press in 1988.

== Biography ==
Ellen Banks was born in 1938 in Boston, Massachusetts, into a Baptist family. Sources sometimes reported different years of birth, but estate research confirms 1938. Banks spent her childhood exploring both painting and music and was inspired by Piet Mondrian. Like her father, she studied classical piano but eventually shifted to painting, believing she could achieve greater creativity through visual art than as a performer:

"I was offered a scholarship many years ago by one of the conservatories in Boston. I realized I was not going to be creative as a pianist; I might become a good performer but that's not creative, that's interpreting. That's why I wanted to be a painter; I wanted to see if I could discover some strange relationship, something that no one else was doing [...]."

She earned a bachelor's degree from the Massachusetts College of Art and studied at the School of the Museum of Fine Arts, Boston. From 1974 to 1996 she taught painting and other artistic techniques at the latter.

== Early Career ==
According to Jules and Nancy Heller (North American Women Artists of the Twentieth Century: A Biographical Dictionary), Ellen Banks' first solo exhibition took place in 1962 at the Dunbarton Galleries in Boston. In the written estate archive, both an original flyer for this exhibition as well as a press release in The Christian Science Monitor from December 7, 1962, One example of her early style of oil painting is the work Children's Game, painted around 1962. were found. The latter described Banks' work as follows:

"Her pictures are still-lifes chiefly, with some landscapes for supplement. The manner of painting is a mixture of the child-like and the post-impressionistic. The design consists of flat elementary shapes of fruits and flowers. Woodland themes are rendered in the same simple statement. Miss Banks makes a show of strength in her handling of color. She uses it with taste and effectiveness, sometimes in smooth flat areas, sometimes conditioned with bold enlivening texturings."

Of particular note is the indication on the flyer that the works shown in this exhibition were executed in oil painting, a technique that Banks later scarcely used and of which only a few examples are preserved in the estate. The only work in the estate that corresponds to the description in the press text is the painting Children's Game.

From this same early period, a small number of works on handmade paper using wax crayon are preserved, representing a rare medium within her overall body of work.

Only five years later, in 1967, she received the Prix de Paris. From 1981, she moved away from oil painting an in her first show and began to use musical scores as the visual basis for her work, drawing on European composers such as Bach as well as finding inspiration in African American music such as the Ragtime artist Scott Joplin.

The painting Midnight Sail from 1969, now in the collection of the San Francisco Museum of Modern Art (SFMOMA), represents an important work from Banks' early creative period. According to the SFMOMA online catalog, the work entered the museum's collection in 1983 through a donation from Channing J. Woodsum and Judith L. Woodsum. Midnight Sail is attributed to the artist's early period, but already shows an increased focus on geometric forms that would characterize her later style.

The year 1970 marked another important milestone in Banks' career. Her participation in the group exhibition Afro-American Artists: New York and Boston proved significant not only on a socio-political level, but also represented a personal success. This exhibition presumably opened up the opportunity for Banks to hold a solo exhibition at the National Center of Afro-American Artists (NCAAA) in Boston two years later, in 1972. A contemporary review in the Boston Globe on January 11, 1972, documents this solo exhibition, which further cemented Banks' position in the African American art scene.

The group exhibition “Afro-American Artists: New York and Boston” in 1970, created in collaboration between the Museum of Fine Arts and the National Center of Afro-American Artists in Boston, is considered the first exhibition of contemporary Afro-American artists of this magnitude. Over 150 works by 70 artists from Boston and New York were shown, including Ellen Banks. The presentation, which ran from May 19 to June 23 was part of the so-called black shows, a series of art exhibitions and cultural events that focused on African American artists in the 1960s and 1970s.

In addition to her formal education at the Massachusetts College of Art, Banks received training from César Domela and Hans Jaffé. Between 1981 and 1982 Banks spent time in Amsterdam where she studied at the University of Amsterdam with the renowned art historian Hans L. C. Jaffé. A testament to this period is an original letter from the Dutch De Stijl artist César Domela dated November 1, 1981, which was found in her estate. Domela had invited Banks to Paris in 1981 and expressed his appreciation for her work: “J'apprécie beaucoup son œuvre, qui promet un développement très intéressant.” In 1983, Banks moved to Paris with her second husband, Bernard Feld. There she worked with Domela until 1984.

== Methodology ==
The early 1980s marked a decisive turning point in Ellen Banks' artistic career. According to statements made by the artist in interviews, she developed a novel method of translating music into visual language during this period.

Her newly developed method was based on the visual transcription of written scores and accompanied her until the end of her life. According to her own statements, the first work in which she applied this method was created on Thanksgiving Day 1981 and is entitled Bartók Mikrokosmos, in reference to the Hungarian composer Béla Bartók. From this early phase from 1980 to 1984, which is still characterized by a very clear structure and strictly geometric forms, the posthumous works include J.S. Bach Trio F Minor, Bartók Meditation, Bach: Prelude, well tempered clavier, Markevitch Variations, Erik Satie – Improvisation 6B, and Erik Satie – First Nocturne.

Ellen Banks developed an artistic process based on the visual transcription of musical notation into color. Each note corresponded to a specific color: A = red, B = orange, C = yellow, D = green, E = indigo, F = violet, and G = neutral. Her color system followed the alphabetical order of notes and mirrored the order of spectral colors of the prismatic scala. This method formed the foundation of her entire transcriptive approach.

Furthermore, she deliberately avoided listening to the music while painting, treating the score as a purely visual and structural phenomenon rather than a sonic experience. In her words:

„I never listen to the piece on which I am working. Often, when I work, I do not listen to music at all. Music is a complete experience, and I cannot concentrate on painting while I listen to music. I work from the written score because I am interested in visual relationships and patterns. I often say that a musician takes the score and makes a performance, while I take the score and make a painting”.

Banks drew inspiration from classical composers such as Bach, Beethoven, Schumann, and Scarlatti, as well as from popular and jazz music by artists like Cyndi Lauper and Aretha Franklin. When asked why she focused largely on Western composers, she cited her musical education: “My father was a fine musician, and when you learn music, you learn through the Western methods and traditions.”

However, her estate also includes works that engage with spirituals—songs rooted in the history of enslaved Africans in North America, which became a key element of African American musical and cultural identity.

Around 1986, Banks’ method evolved from a rigid, formal transcription of notation to a freer and more subjective interpretation. She began to treat the musical score less as a rule and more as a catalyst for personal expression: “I am getting stronger in my own thinking. Further away from the music. The music is really becoming like a catalyst for what I want to say.”

Her 1988 series Nocturnes, based on Frédéric Chopin's piano nocturnes, exemplifies her mature technique in acrylic on canvas. The series comprises 19 works, all preserved intact in her estate. Dark backgrounds evoke the central theme of night, while gold and silver tones represent the moon and stars, with other color combinations evoking urban nightlife and fireworks.

From the 1980s onwards, Ellen Banks' artistic development shows a consistent engagement with notation as a visual structure and basis for an independent artistic language. Her work illustrates how musical scores can serve as visual and methodological starting points for artistic creation beyond their function for sound reproduction. The gradual shift away from strictly systematic transcription toward a freer, more interpretive approach marks an expansion of her artistic repertoire without abandoning the connection to the musical source material.

By combining her analytical approach with design principles, Banks has succeeded in developing an independent artistic position at the interface between musical notation and abstract art.

== Notable works ==
- Bovadra, 1975, Addison Gallery of American Art, Andover, Massachusetts
- Scott Joplin, 1982, Addison Gallery of American Art, Andover, Massachusetts
- Maple Leaf Rag. Artist book. Atlanta: Nexus Press, 1989. ISBN 0932526632. OCLC 78614911.
