= Bovadra =

1975 painting by Ellen Banks

- Artist: Ellen Banks
- Year: 1975
- Medium: Acrylic on canvas
- Dimensions: 167.64 cm × 167.64 cm (66.00 in × 66.00 in)
- Location: Addison Gallery of American Art, Andover

Bovadra is a painting by Ellen Banks. It is in the collection of the Addison Gallery of American Art in Andover, Massachusetts in the United States.

The painting comprises acrylic paint on canvas. Completed in 1975, Bovadra is an abstract artwork that features sharp, at times triangular shapes, in grey and white shades. It is almost landscape-like in appearance.

Bovadra was purchased by the Addison Gallery of American Art in 1975. It has been exhibited twice at the Addison Gallery:

- 1982, Afro-American Artists
- 1988, Large Scale Works: Drawings, Prints, Photographs, Sculpture and Painting from the Addison Gallery of American Art
