= Kara Walker =

American painter and installation artist (born 1969)

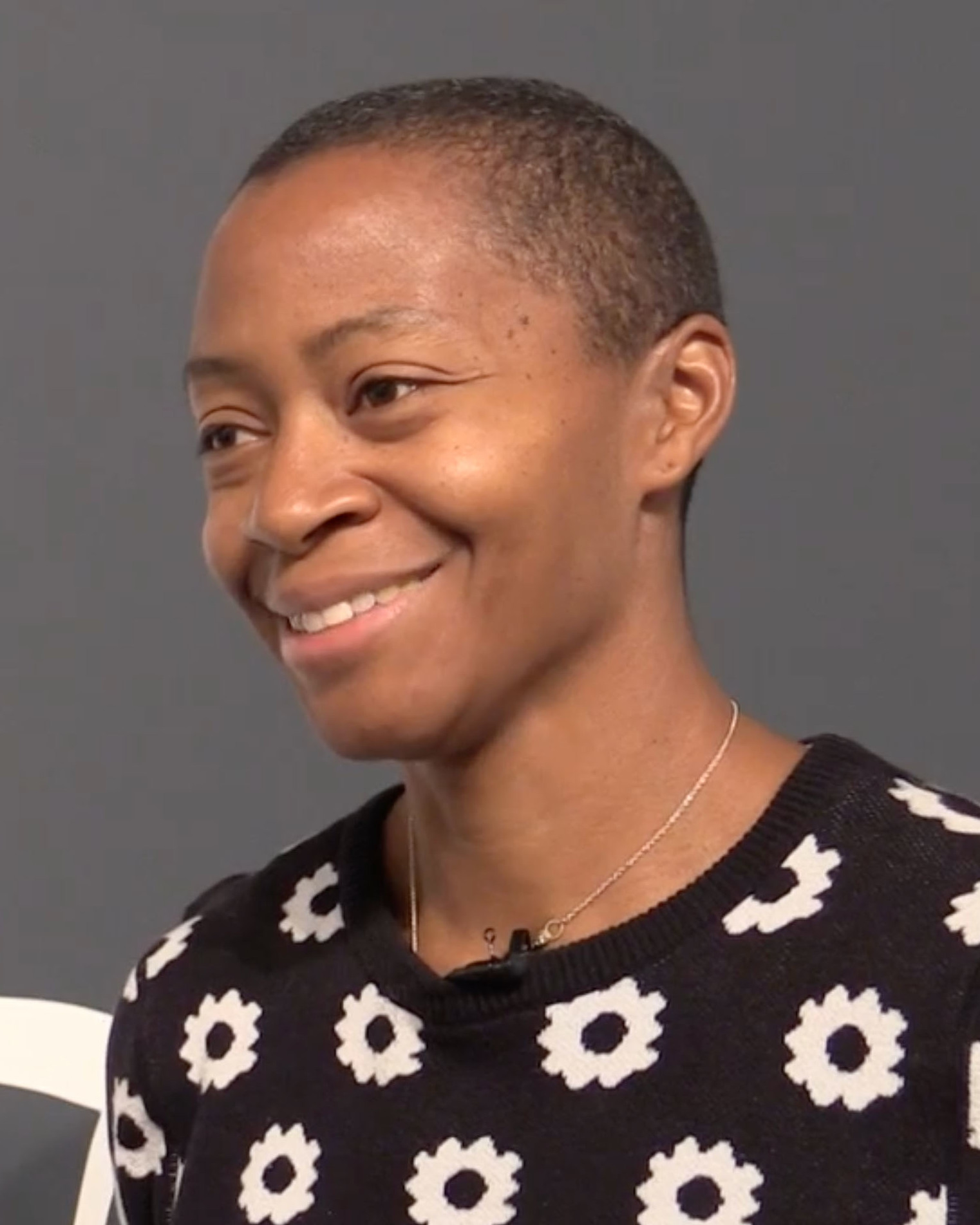
- Walker in 2013
- Born: November 26, 1969 (age 56); Stockton, California, U.S.
- Notable work: Darkytown Rebellion, no place (like home), A Subtlety
- Spouses: Klaus Bürgel (m. 1996; div. 2010) Ari Marcopoulos (m. 2025)
- Father: Larry Walker
- Awards: MacArthur fellowship
- Website: karawalkerstudio.com

Kara Elizabeth Walker (born November 26, 1969) is an American contemporary painter, silhouettist, printmaker, sculptor, installation artist, filmmaker, and university professor, who explores race, gender, sexuality, violence, and identity in her work. Walker is most well known for her room-size tableaux of black cut-paper silhouettes that interrogate romantic narratives of the antebellum South of the United States. She is regarded as among the most prominent and acclaimed Black American artists working today.

Walker was awarded a MacArthur fellowship in 1997, at the age of 28, becoming one of the youngest ever recipients of the award. She has been the Tepper Chair in Visual Arts at the Mason Gross School of the Arts, Rutgers University since 2015.

== Early life and education ==
Walker was born in 1969 in Stockton, California. Her father, Larry Walker, was a painter and professor. Her mother Gwendolyn was an administrative assistant. A 2007 review in New York Times described her early life as calm, noting that "nothing about [Walker's] very early life would seem to have predestined her for this task. Born in 1969, she grew up in an integrated California suburb, part of a generation for whom the uplift and fervor of the civil rights movement and the want-it-now anger of Black Power were yesterday's news."

When Walker was 13, her father accepted a position at Georgia State University. They settled in the city of Stone Mountain. The move was a culture shock for the young artist. In sharp contrast with the multicultural environment of Central California, Stone Mountain still held Ku Klux Klan rallies. At her new high school, Walker recalls, "I was called a 'nigger,' told I looked like a monkey, accused (I didn't know it was an accusation) of being a 'Yankee.'"

Walker received her BFA from the Atlanta College of Art in 1991 and her MFA in painting from the Rhode Island School of Design (RISD) in 1994. Walker recalls reflecting on her father's influence: "One of my earliest memories involves sitting on my dad's lap in his studio in the garage of our house and watching him draw. I remember thinking: 'I want to do that, too,' and I pretty much decided then and there at age 2½ or 3 that I was an artist just like Dad." She found herself uncomfortable and afraid, however, to address the issues of race within her art during her early college years, worrying it would be received as "typical" or "obvious"; however, she began introducing them into her art while attending RISD for her master's.

== Career ==
Walker first became known for her oversize tableaux of cut-paper silhouettes, usually black figures against a white wall, which address the history of American slavery and racism through violent and unsettling imagery. She has also produced works in gouache, watercolor, video animation, shadow puppets, magic lantern projections, as well as large-scale sculptural installations like her ambitious 2014 public exhibition with Creative Time called A Subtlety, or the Marvelous Sugar Baby, an Homage to the unpaid and overworked Artisans who have refined our Sweet tastes from the cane fields to the Kitchens of the New World on the Occasion of the demolition of the Domino Sugar Refining Plant. The black-and-white silhouettes confront the realities of Western history while also using the stereotypes from the era of American slavery to relate to persistent modern-day concerns. Drawings also constitute a significant portion of Walker's body of work. The artist reserves a special meaning to this medium in her artistic practice as a space to confront the Western canon and find freedom from its historical criteria dominating painting: “I gravitated towards [drawing] pretty early on in graduate school […] partly as a way to escape the chains of western painting. […] Drawing transforms a blank page into a site of reflection.” A major retrospective dedicated to Walker’s drawings and archival materials was held at Kunstmuseum Basel in 2021.

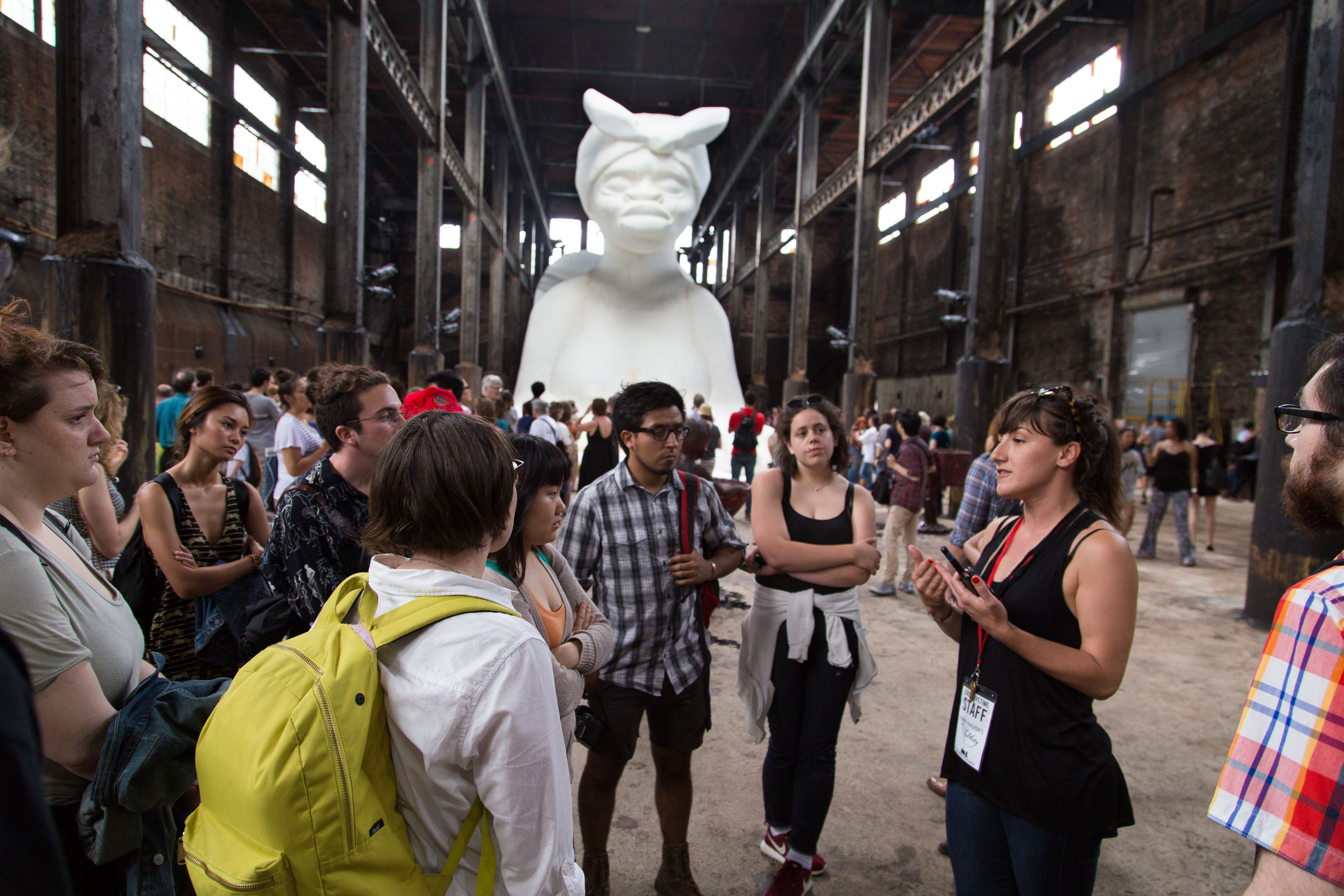
Visitors at Walker's A Subtlety. The white sculpture depicting a woman in the shape of a sphinx is visible in the background.

She first came to the art world's attention in 1994 with her mural Gone, An Historical Romance of a Civil War as It Occurred Between the Dusky Thighs of One Young Negress and Her Heart. This cut-paper silhouette mural, presenting an Antebellum South filled with sex and slavery, was an instant hit. The artwork's title references Margaret Mitchell's popular novel Gone with the Wind, and the individual figures in the tableau index the fairy-tale universe of Walt Disney in the 1930s. At the age of 28, Walker became the second youngest recipient of the John D. and Catherine T. MacArthur Foundation's "genius" grant, second only to Mayanist David Stuart. In 2007, the Walker Art Center exhibition Kara Walker: My Complement, My Oppressor, My Enemy, My Love was the artist's first full-scale U.S. museum survey.

According to an exhibition review on Art Tattler, "Walker's silhouette images work to bridge unfinished folklore in the Antebellum South, raising identity and gender issues for African-American women in particular. ... Walker uses images from historical textbooks" to show how enslaved African Americans were depicted during that time. The silhouette was typically a genteel tradition in American art history; it was often used for family portraits and book illustrations. Walker carried on this portrait tradition but used them to create characters in a nightmarish world, a world that reveals the brutality of American racism and inequality. Walker incorporates ominous, sharp fragments of the South's landscape, such as Spanish moss trees and a giant moon obscured by dramatic clouds. These images surround the viewer and create a circular, claustrophobic space. The circular format paid homage to another art form, the 360-degree historical painting known as the cyclorama.

Some of her images are grotesque; for example, in The Battle of Atlanta, a white man, presumably a Southern soldier, is raping a black girl while her brother watches in shock; and a enslaved black male rains tears all over a white adolescent boy. The use of physical stereotypes such as flatter profiles, bigger lips, straighter nose, and longer hair helps the viewer immediately distinguish the black subjects from the white ones. Walker depicts the inequalities and mistreatment of African Americans by their white counterparts. Viewers at the Studio Museum in Harlem in 2003 looked sickly, shocked, and appalled upon seeing her exhibition. Thelma Golden, the museum's chief curator, said that "throughout her career, Walker has challenged and changed the way we look at and understand American history. Her work is provocative, emotionally wrenching, yet overwhelmingly beautiful and intellectually compelling." Walker has said that her work addresses the way Americans look at racism with a "soft focus", avoiding "the confluence of disgust and desire and voluptuousness that are all wrapped up in ... racism".

Her influences include Andy Warhol, whose art Walker says she admired as a child, Adrian Piper, and African American satirist Robert Colescott. In an interview with New York's Museum of Modern Art, Walker stated: "I guess there was a little bit of a slight rebellion, maybe a little bit of a renegade desire that made me realize at some point in my adolescence that I really liked pictures that told stories of things–genre paintings, historical paintings– the sort of derivatives we get in contemporary society."

== Process: Silhouette installations ==
Walker may be widely known for her immersive site-specific installations. Walker plays and almost blurs the lines between types of art forms. Elements of her installations like the theatrical staging or the life-size cut figurines contribute to and somewhat evoke performative art behavior. As Walker has mentioned before, she talks more on the ideas and concepts behind the artwork rather than focusing on the initial aesthetic and visual aspect of it, creating more of a conceptual outlook.

Shelly Jarenski discusses Walker's art in the context of panoramas. Panoramas were a popular form of entertainment in the nineteenth century that usually depicted historical scenes or vast landscapes. Walker's work demonstrates that the aesthetic experiences embedded in the panorama (though those experiences are rooted in the particular contexts of the nineteenth century) persist as a concern in African American art, just as the social consequences of slavery and the racial narratives that structured it persist in shaping our contemporary cultural narratives of race and space. Walker's work demonstrates how immersive, panoramic installations can affect viewers, helping scholars better understand the visual experience that is often missing from historical records. When viewing Walker's panoramas, they are illustrative of past events or depictions of the enslavement of African Americans. Her ability to combine devices that were used in the past and recontextualize with the sinful scenes she creates in her large-scale installations deconstructs the aesthetic of these installations. As Jarenski mentioned in her article, Walker's panoramas provide a visual example of how her panoramas affect the viewers which is different from 19th-century panoramas which were limited to written sources. Walker's installations are able to create a contemporary visual interpretation and reinforce one of the themes of panoramas, to depict historical events.

Walker once explained her artistic process as "two parts research and one part paranoid hysteria", a description that captures the entanglement of history and fantasy that pervades her work. Even despite the rational aspect, there's a sense of uneasiness and complexity that ties and illustrates itself through her work.

=== Notable works ===
In her piece created in 2000, Insurrection! (Our Tools Were Rudimentary, Yet We Pressed On), the silhouetted characters are against a background of colored light projections. This gives the piece a transparent quality, evocative of the production cels from the animated films of the 1930s. It also references the plantation story Gone With the Wind and the Technicolor film based on it. Also, the light projectors were set up so that the shadows of the viewers were cast on the wall, including them as characters and encouraging them to assess the work's tough themes. In 2005, Walker created the exhibit "8 Possible Beginnings" or: "The Creation of African-America, a Moving Picture," which introduced moving images and sound. This helped further immerse the viewers into her dark worlds. In this exhibit, the silhouettes are used as shadow puppets. Additionally, she uses the voice of herself and her daughter to suggest how the heritage of early American slavery has affected her image as an artist and woman of color.

In response to Hurricane Katrina, Walker created After the Deluge since the hurricane had devastated many poor and Black areas of New Orleans. Walker stated that she was bombarded with news images of "black corporeality". She likened these casualties to enslaved Africans piled onto ships for the Middle Passage, the Atlantic crossing to America.

I was seeing images that were all too familiar. It was black people in a state of life-or-death desperation, and everything corporeal was coming to the surface: water, excrement, sewage. It was a re-inscription of all the stereotypes about the black body.

Walker took part in the 2009 inaugural exhibition at Scaramouche Gallery in New York City with a group exhibit called "The Practice of Joy Before Death; It Just Wouldn't Be a Party Without You". Works by Kara Walker in 2011 include Fall Frum Grace, Miss Pipi's Blue Tale (April–June 2011) at Lehmann Maupin, in collaboration with Sikkema Jenkins & Co. A concurrent exhibition, "Dust Jackets for the Niggerati- and Supporting Dissertations, Drawings submitted ruefully by Dr. Kara E. Walker", opened at Sikkema Jenkins on the same day.

Walker created Katastwóf Karavan for the 2018 art festival "Prospect.4: The Lotus in Spite of the Swamp" in New Orleans. This sculpture was an old-timey wagon, with Walker's signature silhouettes portraying slaveholders and enslaved people making up the sides and a custom-built steam-powered calliope playing songs off "black protest and celebration". It was also displayed at the National Gallery of Art Sculpture Garden May 12–19, 2022.

Although Walker is known for her serious exhibitions with deep meaning behind her work, she admits relying on "humor and viewer interaction". Walker has stated, "I didn't want a completely passive viewer" and "I wanted to make work where the viewer wouldn't walk away; he would either giggle nervously, get pulled into history, into fiction, into something totally demeaning and possibly very beautiful."

=== Commissions ===
In 2002, Walker created a site-specific installation, "An Abbreviated Emancipation (from a larger work: The Emancipation Approximation)," commissioned by The University of Michigan Museum of Art, Ann Arbor. The work represented motifs and themes of race relations and their roots in the system of slavery before the Civil War. Several years later, in 2005, The New School unveiled Walker's first public art installation, a site-specific mural titled Event Horizon, and placed along a grand stairway leading from the main lobby to a major public program space.

Walker's most well-known commission debuted in May 2014. Her first sculpture, this work was a monumental public artwork entitled "A Subtlety, or the Marvelous Sugar Baby, an Homage to the unpaid and overworked Artisans who have refined our Sweet tastes from the cane fields to the Kitchens of the New World on the Occasion of the demolition of the Domino Sugar Refining Plant." The massive work was installed in the derelict Domino Sugar Refinery in Williamsburg, Brooklyn and commissioned by Creative Time. The installation consisted of a female sphinx figure, measuring approximately 75 feet long by 35 feet high, preceded by an arrangement of fifteen life-size young male figures, dubbed attendants. The sphinx, which bore the head and features of the Mammy archetype, was made by covering a core of machine-cut blocks of polystyrene with 80 tons of white sugar donated by Domino Foods. The fifteen male attendants were modeled after racist figurines that Walker purchased online. Five were made from solid sugar, and the other ten were resin sculptures coated in molasses. The fifteen attendants stood 60 inches tall and weighed 300 to 500 pounds each. After the exhibition closed in July 2014, the factory and the artwork were demolished, as had been previously planned.

Walker has hinted that the whiteness of the sugar references its "aesthetic, clean, and pure quality." The slave trade is highlighted in the sculpture as well. Remarking on the overwhelmingly white audience at the exhibition in tandem with the political and historical content of the installation, art critic Jamilah King argued that "the exhibit itself is a striking and incredibly well-executed commentary on the historical relationship between race and capital, namely the money made off the backs of black slaves on sugar plantations throughout the Western Hemisphere. So the presence of so many white people -- and my presence as a black woman who's a descendant of slaves -- seemed to also be part of the show." The work attracted over 130,000 visitors in its eight-weekend run. In his commentary on the sculpture, art historian Richard J. Powell wrote, "No matter how noble or celebratory in tone Walker's title for this work seemed, in this post-modern moment of moral skepticism and collective distrust, a work of art in a public arena—especially a visually perplexing nude—would be subjected to not just serious criticism, but Internet trolling and mockery."

In 2016, Walker revealed her painting Slaughter of the Innocents (They Might be Guilty of Something). In it, Walker depicts an African American woman slicing a baby with a small scythe. The influence for this detail was that of Margaret Garner, an enslaved person who killed he215x215px|r daughter to prevent her child from returning to slavery.

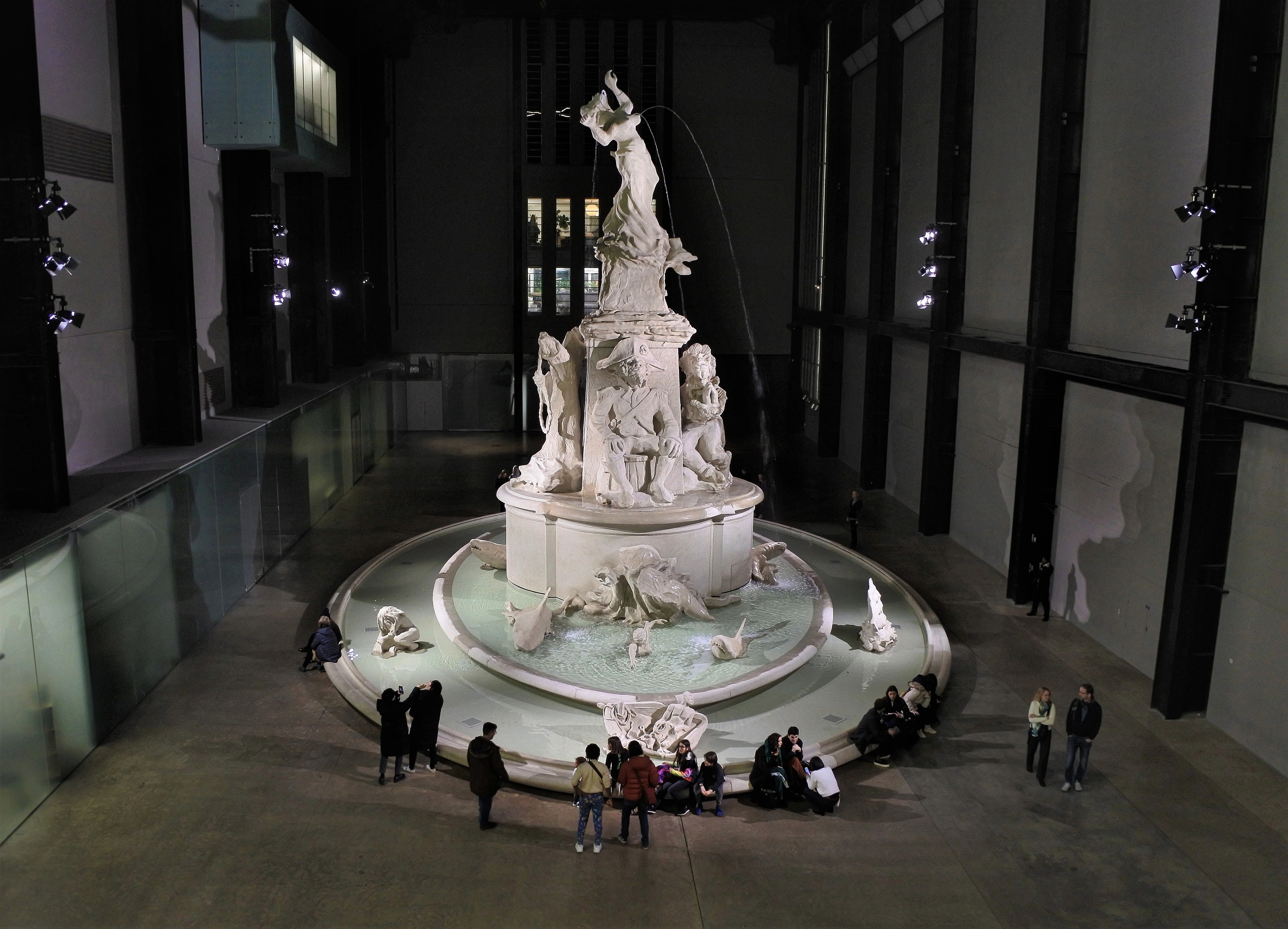
Fons Americanus at Tate Modern, February 2020

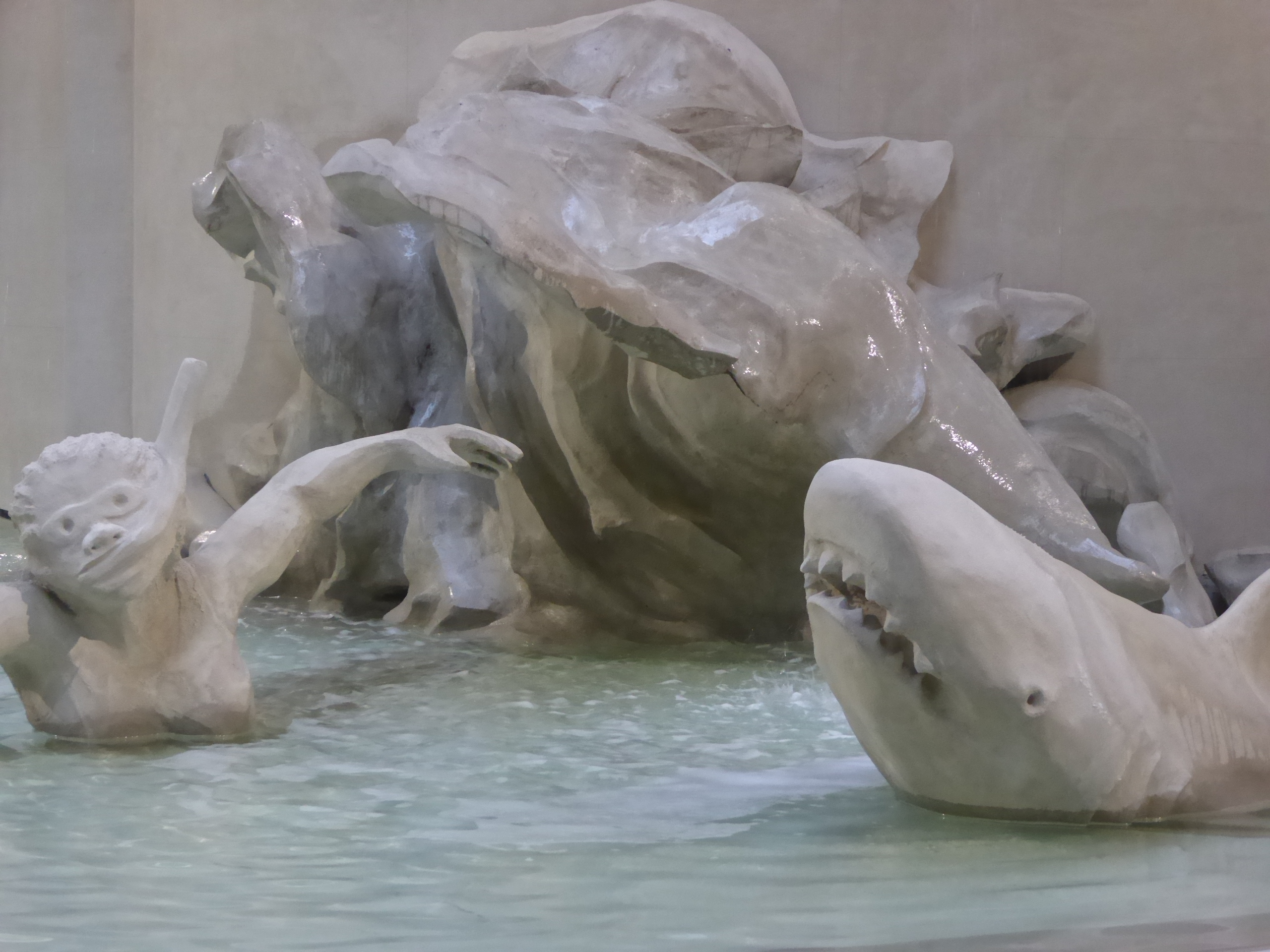
Fons Americanus (Detail)

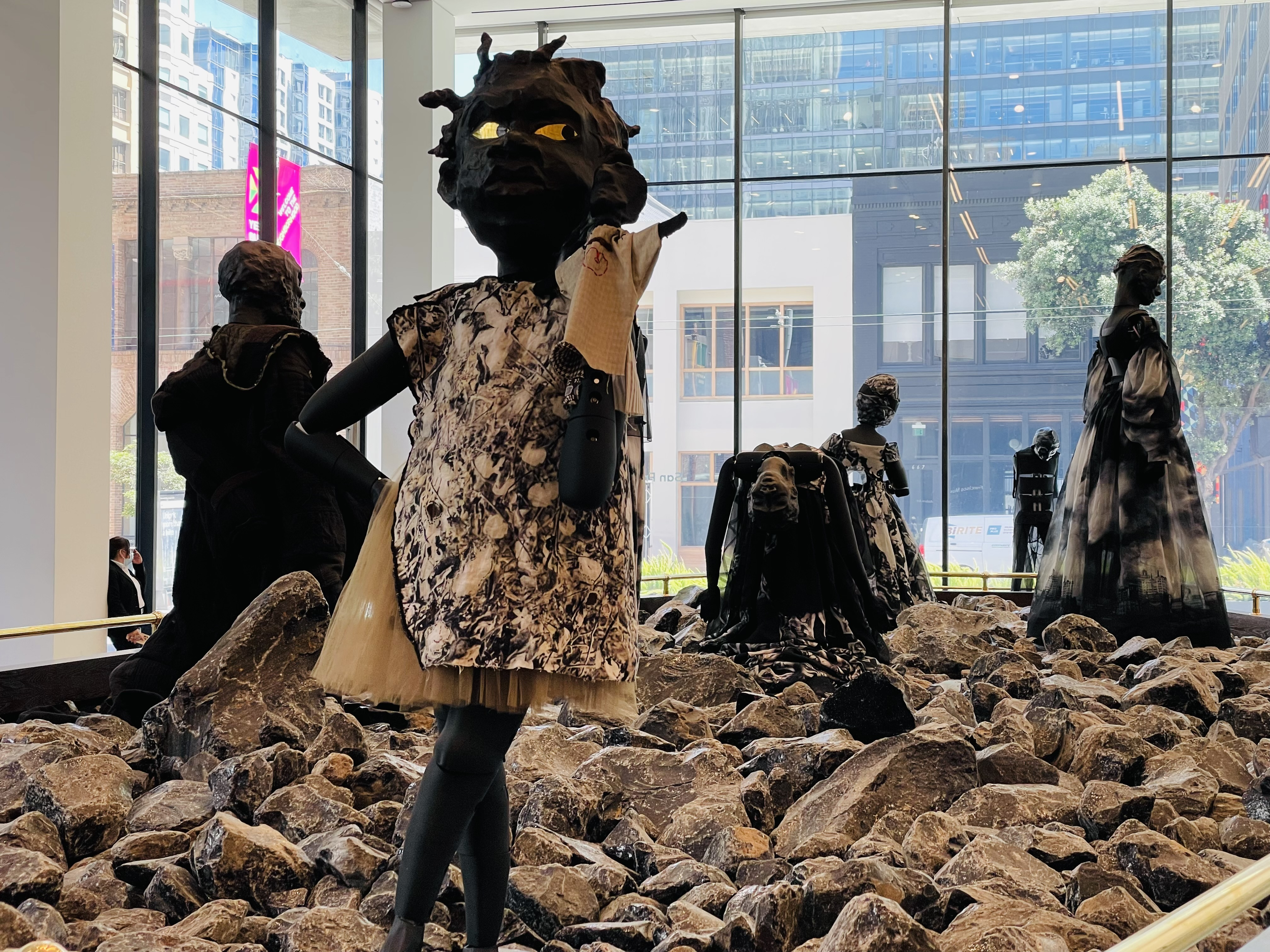
Fortuna and the Immortality Garden (Machine) at SFMOMA

In 2019, Walker created Fons Americanus, the fifth annual Hyundai Commission at Tate Modern's Turbine Hall. The fountain, measuring up to 13 feet (4.0 m), contains allegorical motifs referencing the histories of Africa, America, and Europe, particularly pertaining to the Atlantic slave trade. In her review of Walker's Fons Americanus for Artnet News, Naomi Rea noted that "the piece is so loaded with art-historical and cultural references that you could teach an entire college history course without leaving Turbine Hall." For example, Walker quotes specific artworks including The Slave Ship from 1840 by the British painter J.M.W. Turner and The Gulf Stream from 1899 by the American painter Winslow Homer. She also observed that – owing to the fountain's running water – the work could be both seen and heard in the Turbine Hall. At the same time, the artwork is a sort of public monument inspired in part by the Victoria Memorial in front of Buckingham Palace. In 2019, writer Zadie Smith observed something about public monuments that Walker interrogates in Fons Americanus: "Monuments are complacent; they put a seal upon the past, they release us from dread. For Walker, dread is an engine: it prompts us to remember and rightly fear the ruins we shouldn't want to return to and don't wish to re-create—if we're wise."

In 2023, the San Francisco Museum of Modern Art (SFMOMA) commissioned Walker to create the first site-specific installation for its Roberts Family Gallery. Fortuna and the Immortality Garden (Machine) was on display at SFMOMA from July 2024 to May 2026.

In 2025, Walker was one of the artists commissioned to create a work for Monuments, an exhibition at The Geffen Contemporary at MOCA and The Brick; the other artists were Bethany Collins, Julie Dash, Karon Davis, Abigail DeVille, Stan Douglas, Kevin Jerome Everson, Kahlil Robert Irving, Monument Lab, Walter Price, Cauleen Smith, and Davóne Tines. The works were all newly created for this exhibit and “marks the recent wave of monument removals as a historic moment.” Walker co-curated the exhibit with Hamza Walker, Director of The Brick and Bennett Simpson, Senior Curator at MOCA.

The Monuments exhibition features Walker's sculpture titled Unmanned Drone, which she completed in 2023 from a bronze sculpture by Charles Keck of the confederate general Stonewall Jackson that was decommissioned in 2021. That original sculpture lived in Charlottesville, Virginia in Court Square for a century as a monument to the Civil War. "With the aid of a plasma cutter," according to art critic Carolina A. Miranda, "[Walker] has sliced up a monument that venerated Jackson and reassembled it into something ghastly." For Miranda, the effect is powerful; Walker "dismantles the pleasing aesthetics of white supremacy to reveal the ugliness within."

=== Other projects ===
For the season 1998/1999 in the Vienna State Opera, Walker designed a large-scale picture (176 m^{2}) as part of the exhibition series "Safety Curtain," conceived by museum in progress.

In 2009, she curated volume 11 of Merge Records', Score!. Invited by fellow artist Mark Bradford in 2010 to develop a set of free lesson plans for K-12 teachers at the J. Paul Getty Museum, Walker offered a lesson that had students collaborating on a story by exchanging text messages.

In 2013, Walker produced 16 lithographs for a limited edition, fine art printing of the libretto Porgy & Bess, by DuBose Heyward and Ira Gershwin, published by the Arion Press.

Walker served on the board of directors of the Foundation for Contemporary Arts (FCA) between 2011 and 2016.

=== Concerns and criticism ===
" The Means to an End: A Shadow Drama in Five Acts," etching and aquatint by Walker, five panels, Honolulu Museum of Art, 1995

The Detroit Institute of Art removed her "The Means to an End: A Shadow Drama in Five Acts" (1995) from a 1999 exhibition "Where the Girls Are: Prints by Women from the DIA's Collection" when African-American artists and collectors protested its presence. The five-panel silhouette of an antebellum plantation scene was in the permanent collection and was to be re-exhibited at some point according to a DIA spokesperson.

In the 1999 PBS documentary "I'll Make Me a World," African-American artist Betye Saar criticized Walker's work for its "revolting and negative" depiction of black stereotypes and enslaved people. Saar accused the art of pandering to the enjoyment of "the white art establishment." In 1997 Saar emailed 200 fellow artists and politicians to voice her concerns about Walker's use of racist and sexist imagery and its positive reception in the art world. This attention to Walker's practice led to a 1998 symposium at Harvard University, Change a Joke and Slip the Yoke: A Harvard University Conference on Racist Imagery, which discussed her work.

A Walker piece entitled "The moral arc of history ideally bends towards justice but just as soon as not curves back around toward barbarism, sadism, and unrestrained chaos" at the Newark Public Library was questioned by employees regarding its appropriateness for the reading room where it was hung. The artwork included depictions of the Ku Klux Klan accompanied by a burning cross, a naked black woman fellating a white man, and Barack Obama. The piece was covered but not removed in December 2012. After discussion among employees and trustees the work was again uncovered. In March 2013, Walker visited the New Jersey Newark Public Library to discuss the work. Walker discussed the content of the work, including racism, identity, and her use of "heroic" figures such as Obama. Walker asked, "[d]o these archetypes collapse history? They're supposed to expand the conversation, but they often collapse it." Walker described the overwhelming subject matter of her works as a "too-muchness".

== Exhibitions ==
Walker's first museum survey, in 2007, was organized by Philippe Vergne for the Walker Art Center in Minneapolis and traveled to the Whitney Museum in New York, the Hammer Museum in Los Angeles, and the ARC/Musee d'Art Moderne de la ville de Paris.

=== Solo exhibitions ===
- 2006: "Kara Walker at the Met: After the Deluge" Metropolitan Museum of Art
- 2007: "Kara Walker: My Complement, My Enemy, My Oppressor, My Love" Walker Art Center; traveled to Modern Art Museum of Fort Worth (2008)
- 2013: "Kara Walker, Rise Up Ye Mighty Race!" The Art Institute of Chicago
- 2013: "We at the Camden Arts Centre are Exceedingly Proud to present an Exhibition of Capable Artworks by the Notable Hand of the Celebrated American, Kara Elizabeth Walker, Negress", Camden Art Centre, London (toured to the MAC, Belfast in 2014)
- 2014: "A Subtlety, or the Marvelous Sugar Baby, an Homage to the unpaid and overworked Artisans who have refined our Sweet tastes from the cane fields to the Kitchens of the New World on the Occasion of the demolition of the Domino Sugar Refining Plant," Creative Time, Brooklyn, NY
- 2016: "The Ecstasy of St. Kara," Cleveland Museum of Art
- 2017: "Sikkema Jenkins and Co. is Compelled to Present the Most Astounding And Important Painting Show of the Fall Art Show Viewing Season!", Sikkema Jenkins & Co., New York, NY
- 2019: Untitled – Hyundai Commission, Tate Modern, London
- 2021: "A Black Hole is Everything a Star Longs to Be," Kunstmuseum Basel, Switzerland
- 2021: "Kara Walker: Cut to the Quick from the Collections of Jordan D. Schnitzer and His Family Foundation", Frist Art Museum, Nashville, TN
- 2021-22: "Kara Walker: Cut to the Quick", Cincinnati Art Museum, Cincinnati, OH
- 2023: "Kara Walker: Harper's Pictorial History of the Civil War (Annotated)", New York Historical Society Museum and Library, New York, NY
- 2024-2026: "Kara Walker: Fortuna and the Immortality Garden (Machine)",San Francisco Museum of Modern Art

== Collections ==
Among the public collections holding work by Walker are the Minneapolis Institute of Art and the Weisman Art Museum (Minneapolis, Minnesota); the Metropolitan Museum of Art; the Tate Collection, London; the Pérez Art Museum Miami; the Museum of Contemporary Art, Los Angeles; the Madison Museum of Contemporary Art (Madison, Wisconsin); the Menil Collection, Houston; and the Muscarelle Museum of Art, Williamsburg, Virginia. Early large-scale cut-paper works have been collected by, among others, Jeffrey Deitch and Dakis Joannou.

== Recognition ==
In 1997, Walker, who was 28 at the time, was one of the youngest people to receive a MacArthur fellowship. Walker's work received criticism from older generations of African-American artists who accused her work of being pornographic and of pandering to racism, while targeting a white audience whom these critics felt covertly enjoyed the racist imagery which her work repurposed.

She was the United States representative for the 25th International São Paulo Biennial in Brazil in 2002.

Walker received the 2004 Deutsche Bank Prize and the 2005 Larry Aldrich Award. In 2007, she was listed among Time magazine's 100 Most Influential People in The World, Artists and Entertainers, in an essay written by artist Barbara Kruger. In 2012, she was elected to the American Academy of Arts and Letters and won the International Artist Award from Anderson Ranch Arts Center in Colorado.

In 2016, she was an artist-in-residence at the American Academy in Rome.

Walker has been featured on the PBS series Art21: Art in the Twenty-First Century. Her work appears on the cover of musician Arto Lindsay's recording, "Salt" (2004). In addition, she co-wrote the song "Suicide Demo for Kara Walker" on the Destroyer album "Kaputt."

She was elected to the American Philosophical Society in 2018.

In 2019, Walker was elected to the Royal Academy of Arts in London, as an Honorary Royal Academician (HonRA).

== In art and popular culture ==
She is name-checked by Le Tigre in their 1999 song "Hot Topic." The song was used in a Kohl's commercial in 2016.

In March 2012, performance artist Clifford Owens performed a score by Walker at MoMA PS1.

In 2017, a large scale mural portrait of Walker by artist Chuck Close was installed in a New York City subway station (Q line, 86th Street), part of a MTA public arts program.

== Personal life ==
Early in her career, Walker lived in Providence, Rhode Island, with her husband, German-born jewelry professor Klaus Bürgel, whom she married in 1996. In 1997, she gave birth to a daughter. The couple separated, and their divorce was finalized in 2010. As of 2017, Walker is in a relationship with photographer and filmmaker Ari Marcopoulos. They married in 2025.

Walker moved to Fort Greene, Brooklyn, in 2003 and has been a professor of visual arts in the MFA program at Columbia University since then. She maintained a studio in the Garment District, Manhattan, from 2010 until 2017. In May 2017, she moved her art practice to a studio in Industry City. She also owns a country home in rural Massachusetts.
