= Laxson Creek =

Stream in Bandera County, Texas, U.S.

Coordinates: 29.7740°N 99.1914°W

Laxson Creek is a stream in Bandera County, Texas, in the United States.

Laxson Creek was named in the 1850s for a pioneer settler.

== See also ==
- List of rivers of Texas
