= Ruth Laxson =

American artist (1924–2019)

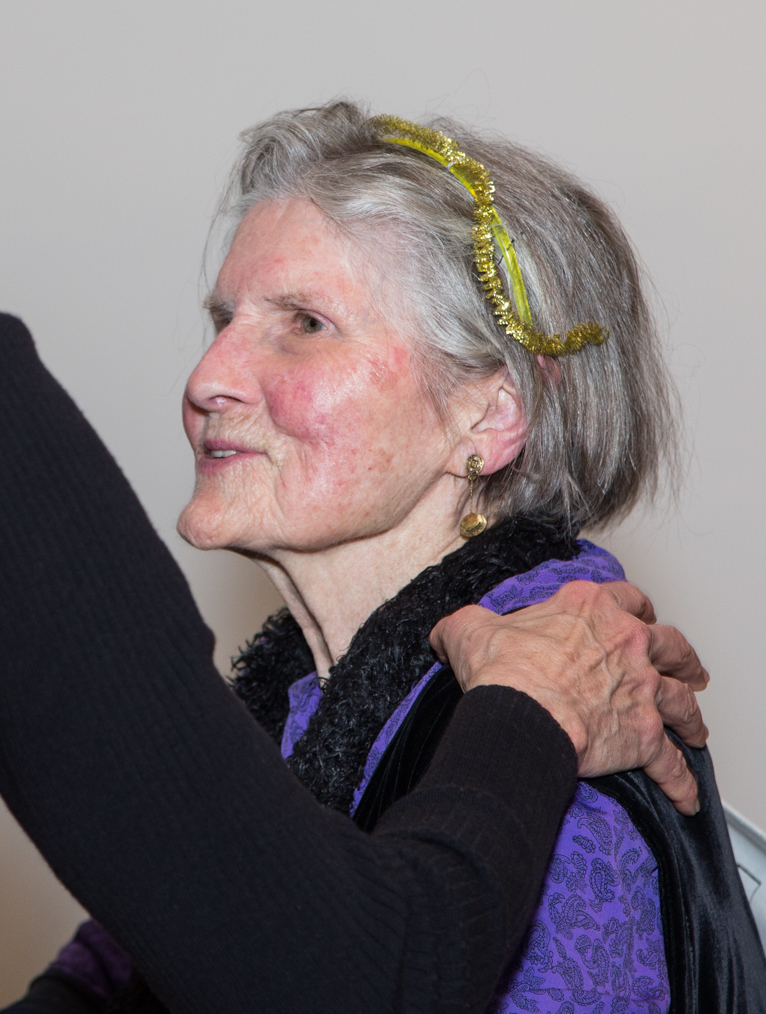
Laxson in 2013

Ruth Knight Laxson (July 16, 1924 – June 1, 2019) was an American artist who specialized in artist's books.

== Biography ==
Ruth Laxson was born in Roanoke, Alabama, the daughter of the Edward Wilts Knight Sr. and Ruby Melinda Dunson Knight. She studied art at Atlanta College of Art (1958–1965) and was based in Atlanta, Georgia from1953. until her death on June 1, 2019.

During most of her career, Ruth Laxson worked in two studios built in 1970 by her husband, Robert Earle Laxson, that sat side by side in the Brookhaven neighborhood of Atlanta. . "It's the eighth day and God has handed us the chisel," says Laxson, who was born to fundamentalist parents, "Artists were sent here to be agents of creativity. I think art is a responsibility, a bit of an onus, a delightful burden. I work hard as hell. It is hard work. The masses think that the artist is just spending the afternoon dabbling."

Ruth Laxson said in a 1992 interview that her earliest works were large color woodcuts that contained biomorphic forms and shapes along with traces of the symbols and markings we have always used to communicate. Around the late '70s she became interested in new paper techniques that put her in touch with the artists' book world. Yet, she never made a book with hand-made paper; when she started making books she wanted them to be more idea-oriented. Her first artist book, done in the early 1980s, was Power Poem, a little book about power. It was a simple little book in black and white, done by offset.

Laxson's books merge images with often fragmented texts that may be handwritten or typeset. Inspired by the Surrealists, she playfully pushed language outside its ordinary meanings. The books may also include collaged or sewn-in elements. Michael Fallon writes, "Her books follow their own logic. Images and texts move in spirals, flow into starbursts and tangles, run erratically across page-spreads, fade, blur, and break up. There are twisting lines of type, plentiful arrows pointing this way and that, words split asunder and reshaped into images (a bird, a train, a house). There are dingbats and other iconograms worked in with their own rationale."

Laxson also made stand-alone prints and drawings, paintings, sculptures, and mail art.

When asked in 1992 what was a major theme of her work, Ruth Laxson replied "Communication." "I am intrigued by the looks of systems of communication—the markings for music and physics and mathematics. "I really want to get beyond words. The idea of making words more meaningful by reducing them, distilling them is wonderful but I think that to really get at life we have to get beyond words." "Obviously you can also play with ideas. You can sound-off or be poetic or whatever. It's a good way to be an anarchist if one wishes. It gives me a chance to shape ideas."

Pattie Belle Hastings writes, "Laxson has an ear for the peculiar and mundane phrases of our everyday lives, taking seemingly innocuous banter from TV, radio, or casual conversation and transforming it into a stream-of-consciousness." Laxson's books are best experienced when read out loud - performed even.

She has been a visiting artist at the University of Iowa, Center for the Book; Atlanta College of Art; and Agnes Scott College. Laxson has exhibited shows at the Neuberger Museum, SUNY; Rolling Stone Press; Atlanta College of Art; National Museum of Women in the Arts, Washington, D.C.; San Antonio Art Institute; and Zeitgenossiche Handpressendrucke, Hamburg.

Collections holding her work include the Victoria & Albert Museum (London), the Getty Center Museum (California), the Museum of Modern Art (New York), the High Museum of Art, the National Museum of Women in the Arts, the Museum of Contemporary Art of Georgia, and the Sackner Archive of Visual and Concrete Poetry. A print she made in honor of James Agee is in Georgia's State Art Collection.

Laxson had her first museum retrospective in 2013 at the Museum of Contemporary Art of Georgia, titled Hip Young Owl, which featured more than 125 works. Laxson's archive has been acquired by the Rhode Island School of Design.

== Selected books ==
- Power Poem (1980).
- Earth Score : A Sound Poem. Atlanta, GA: R. Laxson, 1983. With Raymond Danowski.
- (Ho + Go)² = It. Atlanta]: Nexus Press, 1986. Edition of 500.
- Measure, Cut, Stitch. Atlanta, Ga.: Press 63 Plus, 1987.
- Where Is Everybody? Atlanta, Ga.: Press 63 Plus, 1990. With Raymond Danowski.
- Little Tyrannies. Atlanta, Ga.: Press 63 Plus, 1990. With Raymond Danowski.
- Some Things Are Sacred. Atlanta, Ga. Press 63 Plus, 1991.
- Mythos, Chronos, Logos. Atlanta, Ga.: Press 63 Plus, 2000.
- A Hundred Years of: LEX FLEX. Atlanta, Ga: Nexus Press, 2003.
- Ideas of God : A Ceaseless Wandering Pa-limp-sest B*ok: An Opuscule of Tiny Mirrors Seeking a Single Grand Image. Atlanta, GA: R. Laxson, 2008. Edition of 100.
