= Salome Asega =

American visual artist and researcher

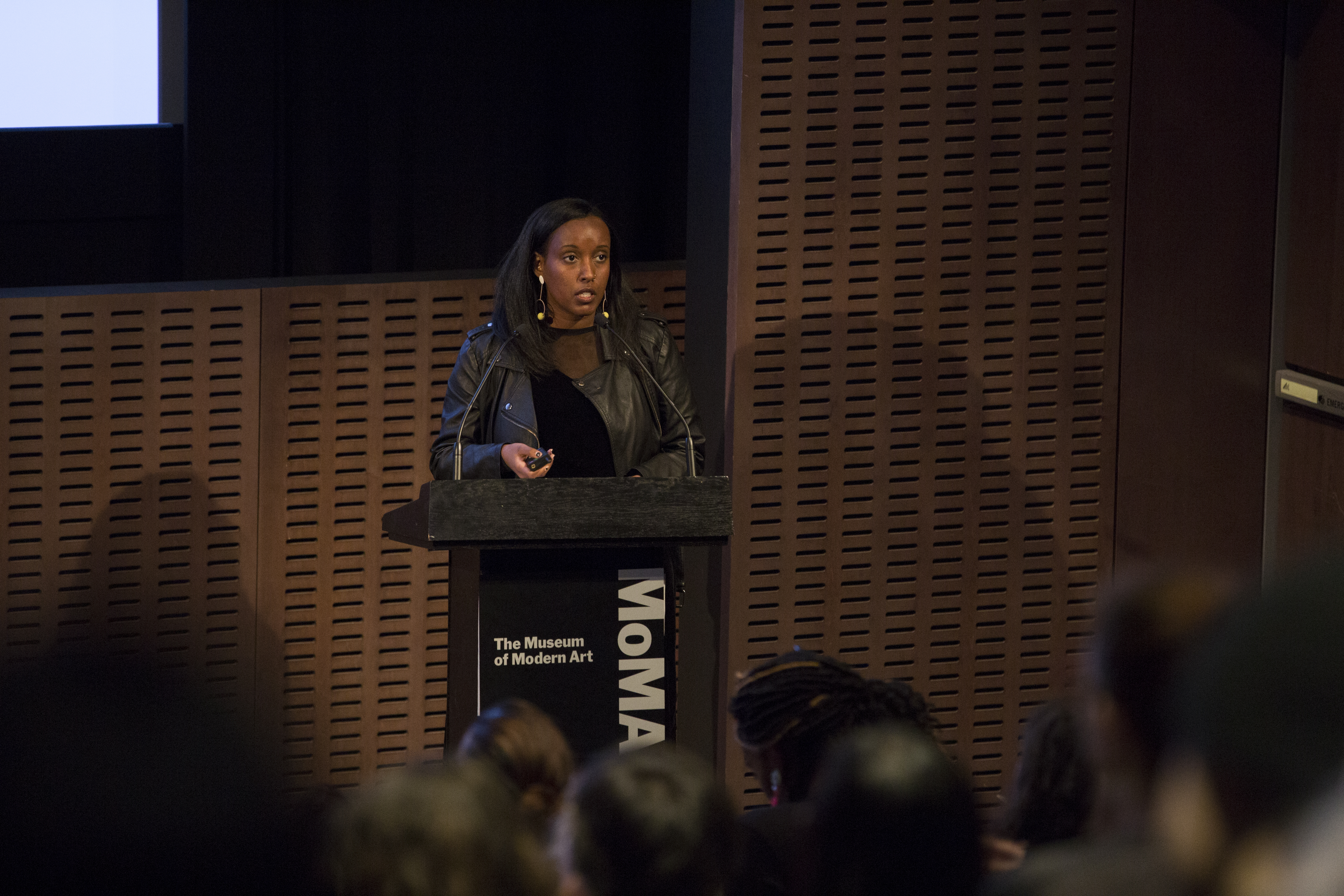
- Asega in 2018
- Born: Salome Asega; Las Vegas, Nevada U.S.
- Education: New York University
- Known for: New media art

Salome Asega is an American artist, researcher, and arts administrator based in New York City. She is the director of NEW INC, the New Museum's incubator for art, design, and technology, and a co-founder of POWRPLNT, a digital arts education nonprofit in Brooklyn. Her artistic practice explores participatory design, emerging technology, and Afrofuturism, with work that examines the social implications of technology and centers communities of African descent.

== Early life and education ==
Asega was born and raised in Las Vegas, Nevada, to Ethiopian immigrant parents. Her father worked in marketing at various casino venues, including the MGM Grand Theatre and The Palms, which exposed her to large-scale event production, immersive entertainment, and spectacle from an early age. Her uncles, who were computer scientists and engineers, introduced her to technology at a young age, having her disassemble and rebuild computers and sending her video games they were developing for feedback.

Asega earned her Bachelor of Arts degree from New York University's Gallatin School of Individualized Study, where she focused on socially engaged art with a minor in sculpture. After graduating in 2011, she traveled to Ethiopia and the West Bank, experiences that sparked her interest in using technology to connect people and communities. She subsequently earned her Master of Fine Arts in Design and Technology from Parsons School of Design at The New School.

== Career ==
Following graduate school, Asega served as Technology Fellow in the Ford Foundation's Creativity and Free Expression program, where she worked to support research on hybrid approaches in the art and technology ecosystem. During her tenure at the Ford Foundation, she commissioned reports including the National Endowment for the Arts' Art and Technology Landscape Study (2021).

=== NEW INC ===
Asega first joined NEW INC as a member of its third cohort in 2016–2017, during which time she incubated POWRPLNT, a digital arts education nonprofit based in Bushwick, Brooklyn. The organization was incubated at NEW INC and operates as a community space offering workshops for young people taught by local artists and musicians.

In July 2021, she was appointed director of NEW INC, the New Museum's cultural incubator founded in 2014, succeeding Stephanie Pereira. NEW INC supports approximately 100 creative entrepreneurs annually across art, design, technology, science, and architecture, providing professional development, mentorship, and shared workspace. Under Asega's leadership, NEW INC has expanded its public-facing programming, launching the DEMO festival in 2023 to showcase member projects to broader audiences through demonstrations, exhibitions, performances, and talks.

Asega has described her approach to running NEW INC as akin to gardening rather than architecture, emphasizing the cultivation of an ecosystem where creative people can have chance encounters and learn from one another across disciplines. She manages a team of seven and oversees programming for over 600 alumni in addition to the annual cohort. In 2022, the Mellon Foundation awarded NEW INC a three-year, $1.5 million grant in support of Asega's vision for the program.

=== Artistic work ===
Asega's artistic practice centers on participatory design, emerging technology, and collaborative making. Her projects are typically co-created with other artists and community members, reflecting an approach she traces to her background in community organizing.

==== Iyapo Repository ====
Iyapo Repository is an ongoing collaborative project co-created with artist Ayodamola Tanimowo Okunseinde, begun during their residency at Eyebeam in 2015. Named after Lilith Iyapo, the protagonist of Octavia Butler's Xenogenesis trilogy, the project is a speculative resource library housing digital and physical artifacts created to represent the future of people of African descent. Through participatory workshops at cultural institutions, participants take on the role of archivists from the future, using a card game designed by the artists to envision technological and cultural artifacts. Participants draw their ideas on manuscripts, which are collected and encased in acrylic in the project's archives. Notable artifacts created through the project include a suit with tubes that pump water from the Atlantic Ocean, designed to evoke the history of the transatlantic slave trade, and a GPS necklace that vibrates when the wearer approaches the site of a shooting by police in New York City.

The project has been exhibited at the 11th Shanghai Biennale, the August Wilson Center in Pittsburgh, Carnegie Library of Pittsburgh, and Macalester College's Law Warschaw Gallery.

==== P0SSESSI0N ====
P0SSESSI0N is a research project exploring connections between virtual reality and spirit possession in West African and Caribbean spiritual systems. The VR experience takes viewers to an underwater environment representing the dwelling of Mami Wata, a deity venerated in parts of Africa and the African Atlantic. The project was first exhibited at Knockdown Center in Brooklyn as part of the group exhibition MAMI, curated by Ali Rosa-Salas and Dyani Douze.

==== RATs ====
RATs (2022) is an installation addressing algorithmic risk assessment tools used in bail and prison sentencing, welfare eligibility, medical benefits, and housing services decisions. The work features a rat-shaped monster truck, combining the acronym RAT with the monster trucks from Monster Jam events. The piece was shown at Nuit Blanche Festival in Toronto in 2022 and at the Munch Museum in Oslo as part of the exhibition "The Machine is Us."

==== Other projects ====
Level Up: The Real Harlem Shake is an interactive video game created in collaboration with curator and dancer Ali Rosa-Salas and Chrybaby Cozie. Developed during a residency at the New Museum with the dance company AUNTS, the project uses modified Kinect software to teach players the original Harlem Shake, a street and hip-hop dance that originated in 1980s Harlem.

Other projects include The Crown Heights Mic, a broadcast network collaboratively built by neighborhood stakeholders and residents; and On the Line, a series transforming found photos of Asega's Ethiopian family into digitally abstracted postcards sent to her grandmother in Addis Ababa, Ethiopia.

== Recognition ==
Asega received the United States Artists Fellowship in Media in 2022. In the same year, she was selected as a member of the inaugural cohort of the Dorchester Industries Experimental Design Lab, a three-year program launched by artist Theaster Gates and Prada Group to support designers of color across the creative industries. She has participated in residencies and fellowships with Eyebeam, the New Museum, The Laundromat Project, Recess, and Pioneer Works. Asega serves on the board for POWERPLNT and the Jerome Foundation.
