= Larry Walker (artist) =

American artist (1935–2023)

- Born: October 22, 1935; Franklin, Georgia, U.S.
- Died: December 25, 2023 (aged 88)
- Education: Wayne State University
- Known for: collage, mixed media, charcoal (art), painting

Larry Walker (October 22, 1935 – December 25, 2023) was an American visual artist and professor emeritus of art. He often used mixed media collages that represent "urban surfaces" on the subjects of existentialism and social injustice. Prior to his death, Walker lived and worked in Stonecrest, Georgia and taught at University of the Pacific and Georgia State University.

== Early life ==
Larry Walker was born in Franklin, Georgia, on October 22, 1935. In 1941, several years after his father's death, Walker's family moved to Harlem where he was inspired by the urban life around him. Walker mentions people-watching from his apartment building's sixth story fire escape, experiences taking the train as a southerner in a large city, and his 145th street community as some of the major inspirations behind his work.

== Career ==
Walker graduated from the High School of Music & Art (now Fiorello H. LaGuardia High School), and relocated to Detroit to attend Wayne State University, where he received both his B.S. in Art Education and M.A. in Drawing and Painting. In 1964, Walker began teaching at the University of the Pacific in Stockton, California where he was a professor and later made chair of the art department. In 1983 he and his family moved to Atlanta, Georgia and he took a position as a professor and director of the art program at Georgia State University, where he taught until his retirement in 2000. He is currently represented by Mason Fine Art in Atlanta, Georgia.

== Artwork ==
In 2016, for his 80th birthday, his daughter Kara collaborated with Sikkema Jenkins, her representing gallery, for a solo exhibition for her father displaying works from over 50 years. “There’s a daughterly intention to understand connections that I lived around and reacted against,” she told the New York Times. The exhibition featured 38 works from Larry Walker's career, depicting the duress endured by human bodies and landscapes over time. His works are a part of the collections of the High Museum of Art, the Studio Museum in Harlem, the Philadelphia Museum of Art, and the Los Angeles County Museum of Art. Walker also has works that are in the Museum of Contemporary Art of Georgia's permanent collection where he held a two-part retrospective exhibition in 2018. Walker's work is also included in the 2020 State of the Art exhibition with Crystal Bridges Museum of American Art as well as a solo exhibition with the Marietta/Cobb Museum of Art in September 2020.

== Personal life ==
Walker married his wife, Gwen, in 1958. They have three children; Dana, Larry Jr., and Kara. Prior to his death, he lived and worked from his home studio in Stonecrest, Georgia.

=== Death ===
Larry Walker died on December 25, 2023, at the age of 88.
