= Dubway Studios =

Recording studio

Coordinates: 40.706033°N 74.012619°W

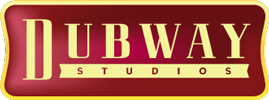
- Company type: Recording Studio
- Industry: Audio post production, Music
- Founded: 1981
- Founder: Al Houghton
- Headquarters: Financial District, Manhattan, New York City, United States
- Services: Voice-over; Dubbing; Music recording; Audio mixing; Audio mastering; Podcasts; Remote recording
- Website: Dubway Studios

Dubway Studios is an audio post and music production facility located in the Financial District of Manhattan, New York City. Services offered at Dubway Studios include tracking, recording, mixing, mastering, music production, voice-over sessions, and remote connections via Source-Connect, phone patch, and Skype.

Dubway's clients have included: HBO, Disney Junior, Discovery Channel, the Nick Jr. Channel and Nickelodeon, PBS Kids, PBS, Showtime, McDonald's, iTunes, IFC, NFL Films, Twentieth Century Fox, NPR, The New York Times, Anohni & the Johnsons, Devendra Banhart, Patti Smith, They Might Be Giants, David Byrne, Cyndi Lauper, Dar Williams, Alicia Keys, Joseph Arthur, Dan Bern, Richard Barone, and Cat Power.

== History ==
Dubway Studios was founded in 1981 by Al Houghton in the historic Music Building in Midtown. The building was known to house a community of musicians and artists and was featured in The New York Times. It was here that Al Houghton recorded They Might Be Giants' eponymous debut album, and Lincoln, their second album.

After 16 years Houghton and his team made the decision to move Dubway Studios to Chelsea, where Mike Crehore joined him as a partner. The studio remained there for 14 years until relocating once more. During this time Dubway expanded into television production, providing the audio for Nickelodeon's award-winning animated children's series, The Backyardigans, Winx Club, and Bubble Guppies. Dubway Studios shares part of the complex with Engine Room Audio.

Al Houghton partnered with Michael Rubin to form Rhumba Recorders, a full-service music and audio production company that provides original songs and scores, musical direction, music and voice recording, sound design, and audio post-production for children's media. Houghton was the Sound Production Supervisor for the Nick Jr. Channel's Emmy-nominated series, Wallykazam!. Dubway continues to record music, film and television audio, podcasts and audio books.

In 2019, Dubway opened Dubway West, a partner studio in Los Angeles. The West Coast branch is led by engineer Chris Montgomery and has worked on recordings by artists including Vampire Weekend, The Roots, Adele, Beck, The Killers, Bishop Briggs, and Macklemore.

In 2023, Dubway Studios relocated to 14 East 4th Street in Manhattan's NoHo neighborhood, in the historic Silk Building.

== Recording Studios ==
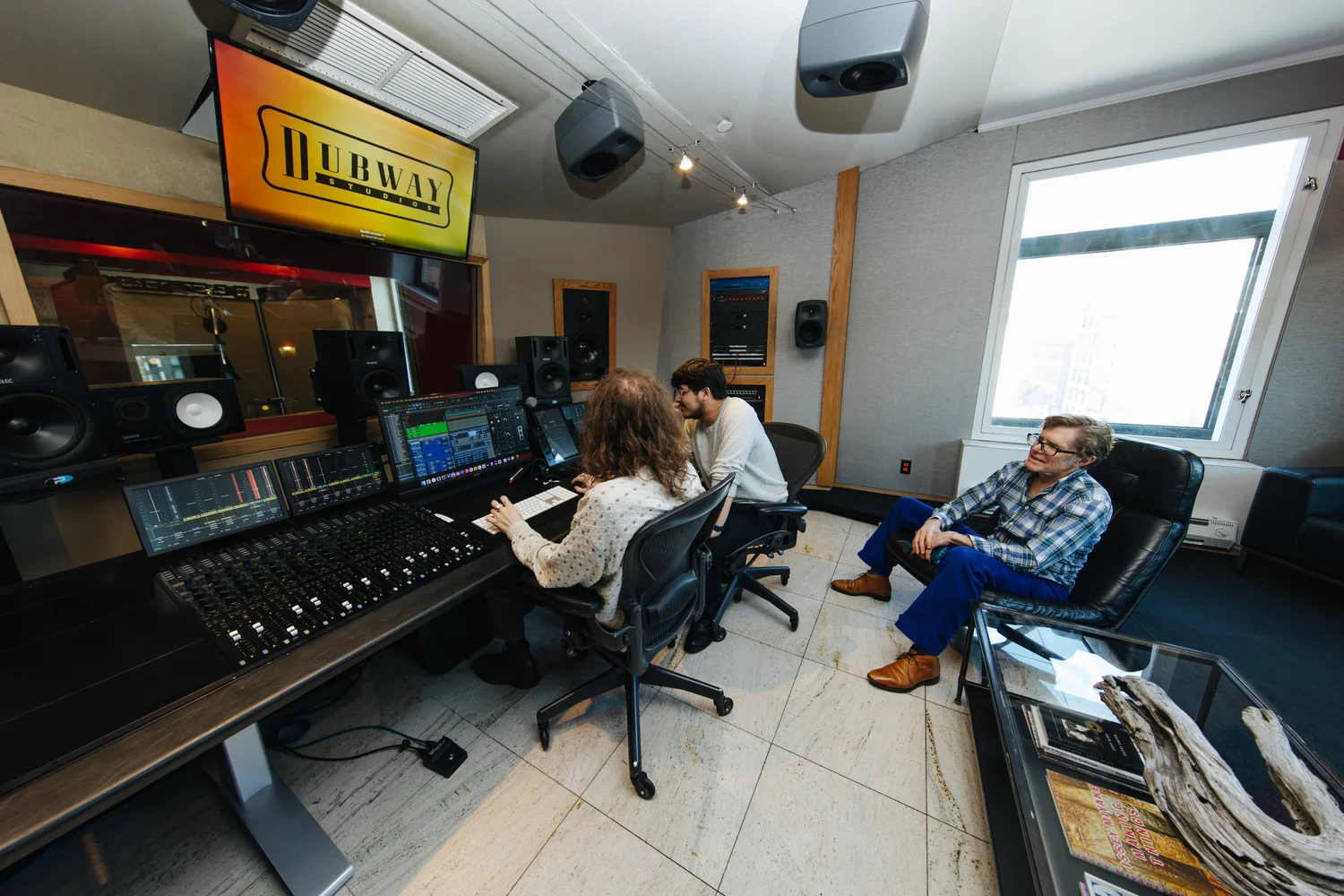
The control room of Studio A at Dubway on E 4th Street in NoHo.

The East Village studio consists of three interconnected control rooms and three sound rooms designed for flexible recording, editing, and mixing workflows. Located at 14 East 4th Street in Manhattan's NoHo neighborhood within the historic Silk Building, the facility includes spaces for voice-over recording, music production, podcasting, overdubs, and remote sessions via Source-Connect. Studio A, the flagship room of the complex, is centered around an Avid S6 control surface and includes a live room featuring a Yamaha C5 grand piano, Dolby Atmos monitoring, and a collection of analog outboard equipment.
