= River Ring (development) =

Planned residential complex in Brooklyn, New York

- Interactive map of the River Ring area

General information
- Classification: Residential
- Coordinates: 40°43′5″N 73°57′56″W
- Estimated completion: 2030

Design and construction
- Architect: BIG
- Developer: Two Trees

River Ring is a mixed-use development planned for the Williamsburg neighborhood of Brooklyn in New York City. Two Trees, the project's developer, commissioned a design from BIG and James Corner Field Operations.

== Development and history ==
Consolidated Edison previously occupied the three lots on which River Ring will rise, using them for purposes including oil storage. Two Trees, the project's developer, purchased the lots in 2019 for $150 million. Two Trees first released public renderings of the project's structures in late 2019. The project abuts the Domino Sugar Redevelopment, also a Two Trees development. Part of the Domino project, Domino Park, was designed by James Corner Field Operations; the firm will also design the outdoor portions of River Ring.

The project will have two towers, originally planned to top out at 600 and 650 feet (180 and 200 m) respectively. Revised plans for the two towers were released in early 2021, increasing the height of one tower to 710 feet and decreasing the other to 560 feet. The project requires rezoning for construction to begin, as zoning currently mandates using the space for commercial or industrial purposes. The project must also go through New York City's Uniform Land Use Review Procedure. An organization, Sustainable Williamsburg, has objected to the rezoning plans. Two Trees anticipates completion by 2027.

Before construction begins, the site will host a miniature golf course and a farm. The golf course opened in July 2021. The development went before the City Planning Commission on August 16, 2021. Two Trees said it would sell the site to a logistics company if the development was not approved. In December 2021, the plan for the development was approved.

In June 2022, a property tax break known as 421a the development was going to utilize expired. Two Trees said that the new tax break, 485x, has requirements that are too strict to make the project financially feasible. The new requirements included much higher minimum wages for construction workers, new affordable housing requirements, and new income band caps. As of May 2024, the development has not started construction because of these reasons.

== Design and usage ==
The buildings will have approximately 1200 residential units, as well as office space and a YMCA. In addition to the residential structures, the development will include a private park with a beach, designed to soak up floodwater, as the development will sit in a floodplain.

== See also ==
- List of tallest buildings in Brooklyn
