= Mark Reigelman =

American artist

- Born: Cleveland, Ohio, US
- Education: Sculpture and Industrial Design, Cleveland Institute of Art; Product Design, Central Saint Martins
- Notable work: Domino Park Playground; Smökers; Manifest Destiny; Groundswell
- Website: https://www.markreigelman.com

Mark Reigelman is an American artist based in Brooklyn, New York City. He is recognized for his large-scale public art, including Manifest Destiny at the Hotel des Arts in San Francisco, California, and Smökers, a series of miniature houses positioned over steam-emitting manholes in New York City.

== Background ==
Reigelman was born in Cleveland, Ohio. He pursued his studies in Sculpture and Industrial Design at the Cleveland Institute of Art and furthered his education in product design at Central Saint Martins, University of the Arts in London. He currently resides in Brooklyn, in a loft apartment that he redesigned.

== Notable works ==
Reigelman's artworks have been exhibited in galleries, museums, and public spaces, including the Cleveland Museum of Art, the Museum of Modern Art (MoMA), and the Shanghai Museum of Glass.

His Rock Boxes, in Cleveland, Ohio, produce snippets of music as pedestrians make their way to the Rock and Roll Hall of Fame. Across the country, his Formation installation, which consists of three sets of screens featuring styles of airplanes, representing local aeronautic history, adorns the façade of San Diego International Airport.

In San Francisco, Reigelman crafted Manifest Destiny, a site-specific artwork showcasing a rustic cabin affixed to the side of the Hotel des Arts.

By 2016, he devised Smökers, mobile art installations influenced by the German incense smokers called Räuchermann. These small wooden cabins were designed to conceal steam-emitting manholes throughout New York. Two years later, Reigelman designed the playground at Domino Park in Williamsburg, Brooklyn, drawing inspiration from the sugar manufacturing process in homage to the site's history as the location of the Domino Sugar Refinery.

The city of Alexandria in Northern Virginia commissioned Reigelman to produce an artwork for the Site: New Views in Old Town Series in 2021. The resulting piece, Groundswell, was displayed in Waterfront Park in Alexandria from March to November 2021. Later in the same year, the city of Columbus, Ohio, unveiled another of Reigelman's creations, The Makers' Monument. This 20-foot stainless steel installation, resembling crystals and perforated with items symbolic of the city's manufacturing history such as saw blades and rocking horses, stands as a tribute to the goods produced in the city. The Makers' Monument was later included in Coda Worx' 2022 Coda Awards Top 100 Pieces of Public Art in the World.

=== Other public art works ===
- Stair Squares, 2007, Borough Hall, Brooklyn, New York
- White Cloud, 2012, Cleveland Museum of Art, Cleveland, Ohio
- Rainbow Gathering II (The Huddle), 2013, Kendall College of Art and Design
- Reading Nest, 2013, Cleveland Public Library, Cleveland Ohio
- Upriver/Downriver, 2015, Waterfront Park, Louisville, Kentucky
- NidoSilla (Nest Chair), 2015, Monterey, Mexico
- Curioser, 2021, New York Public Library, Charleston Branch, New York
- Wheelhouse, 2022, Jennie Dean Park, Arlington, Virginia
- Threshold, 2023, Custom House Square, New Bedford, Massachusetts
- Edge of the Forest, 2023, Inman Square, Cambridge, Massachusetts

== Awards and recognitions ==
Year	Recipient	Award / Recognition	Award-giving body
2020	Curioser	Excellence in Design	New York City Public Design Commission, 38th Annual Awards for Excellence in Design
2019	The Meeting House	National Recognition to the Best in Public Art Projects	Americans for the Arts, Year in Review
2017	Smökers	National Recognition to the Best in Public Art Projects	Americans for the Arts. Year in Review
2015	Mark Reigelman	2015 Windgate Fellowship Project Grant	Asheville Area Chamber of Commerce
2006	Mark Reigelman	2006 Windgate-Lamar Fellowship Grant	Center for Craft
