= The Cutting Room Studios =

Recording studio in New York City

The Cutting Room Studios is a recording studio collective based in Manhattan, New York City. Founded in the early 1990s by producer and engineer David Crafa while he was attending New York University, the company provides music recording and audio post-production services across its Manhattan facilities.

The studio opened its first commercial location in 1996 at 678 Broadway, where it operated for approximately a decade and hosted recording sessions for artists including Big Pun, Mobb Deep, Big L, SWV, and The Roots.

In 2006, the company relocated to the iconic Silk Building in the NoHo neighborhood, and began expanding into film and television audio post-production, voiceover recording, and podcasting.

In 2023, the company opened a second Manhattan facility in Chelsea focused on music recording and production. The NoHo facility continues to be used for post-production work, while the Chelsea location is used for music recording and mixing.

== History ==
The Cutting Room Studios was founded in the early 1990s by producer and engineer David Crafa while he was attending New York University. Crafa began recording artists from a loft space on West 25th Street using a 16-track recorder before establishing a commercial studio operation. Crafa stated in a 2024 interview that the loft was subject to an armed robbery during its early use, after which he transitioned toward establishing a formal studio facility.

In 1996, the studio opened a commercial facility at 678 Broadway in Manhattan. From 1996 to 2006, the facility was used for recording sessions by artists including Big Pun, Mobb Deep, Big L, SWV, and The Roots. The studio is seen in the 2022 Netflix documentary Jeen-yuhs during a session with Kanye West and Talib Kweli.

In 2006, The Cutting Room Studios relocated to 14 East 4th Street in Manhattan’s NoHo neighborhood, in the Silk Building. Shortly after opening, the NoHo studio became a primary recording location for John Legend's 2006 album Once Again. The facility is now used for film and television audio post-production, voiceover recording, podcast production, audiobook recording, and Dolby Atmos mixing.

In 2023, the company opened a second studio on West 24th Street in Chelsea. According to a Sweetwater studio tour, the facility includes two control rooms and a central live room, intended to serve larger scale multitracking sessions than the company's previous locations. A Genelec case study characterizes the Chelsea facility as a contemporary recording and mixing environment optimized for large-format production and hybrid analog–digital workflows.

The Chelsea location of The Cutting Room Studios has also hosted sessions for a new generation of hip-hop artists, including Ken Carson, who was interviewed by Complex Networks while completing his 2022 album X at the studio. In the article, Complex described The Cutting Room as “a New York studio where Cardi B, Future, DJ Khaled, and other stars have recorded." During an XXL 2025 interview filmed at The Cutting Room Studios in Chelsea, Destroy Lonely described spending long hours recording at the studio while working on his forthcoming album, Drop Dead Gorgeous.

== Legacy ==
=== Ben H. Allen ===
Producer Ben H. Allen worked as an assistant engineer at The Cutting Room early in his music career.

=== Ken Lewis ===
Producer Ken Lewis worked as an engineer at The Cutting Room's Broadway location from the mid nineties through the early 2000s, citing the studio as his main stomping grounds & recording location for Nelly's 2000 single "Ride Wit Me". Lewis also mixed "B-Boy Document '99" by The High & Mighty while at The Cutting Room, a song that would later be featured in Tony Hawk's Pro Skater 2.

=== Just Blaze ===
Producer Justin Smith, better known as Just Blaze, started as an intern at The Cutting Room and moved his way to night manager and lead producer.

=== Mike Elizondo ===
Mike Elizondo mixed Regina Spektor's album What We Saw from the Cheap Seats at Studio A in 2011.

== Film, television and video games ==
Over the last 10 years, The Cutting Room has emerged as a leader in Audio Post Production, both in film and television as well as podcast and audiobook recording. Equipped with a Zephyr ISDN box, the studio specializes in remote connections in addition to ADR and voiceover recording.

== KEXP partnership ==
The Cutting Room has partnered with KEXP radio to provide space and technology for artists to connect their live performances with listeners around the world. Over the course of the partnership The Cutting Room has hosted the radio station's NYC in-studio performances, including Yeasayer and Fitz and the Tantrums.
