= Suzanne Fiol =

American photographer and impresario

Suzanne Fiol, photographed by Joe Holmes

Suzanne Fiol (United States, May 9, 1960 – October 5, 2009), "an impresario of avant-garde culture in New York", founded the performance space ISSUE Project Room in 2003 and oversaw its growth from the fringes of the New York new music scene into what The Village Voice, The Brooklyn Borough President, and Fiol herself predicted would become the "Carnegie Hall for the avant-garde" when it opened its Downtown Brooklyn location in 2011. Fiol's goal in life "was to create a dynamic environment for music, performance, readings, and the development of new work, and she succeeded; the organization has become a reference for experimental art in New York City….(S)he devoted her life to the promotion of experimental culture."

A fixture of the downtown experimental performing art scene for twenty years, she was an early supporter of composer Rhys Chatham, experimental musicians like Alan Licht and Tony Conrad, Sonic Youth, the reclusive Texas musician Jandek, drummer Ikue Mori, and "new-music regulars like Marc Ribot, Anthony Coleman and Elliott Sharp", numbers of teenage and obscure bands, (for instance "Nautical Almanac, the hyper-obscure Baltimore noise duo " as well as established groups like Moby, which provided a fundraiser appearance for ISSUE Project Room. In addition to her leadership role in the performing arts, Fiol was a respected photographer whose work was exhibited nationally and internationally and appears in the permanent collections at The Art Institute of Chicago, The Brooklyn Museum, The Queens Museum, and the Milwaukee Art Museum. Fiol died of lung and brain cancer in October, 2009.

== Life ==
A native of New York City, Fiol attended the experimental Antioch College in Yellow Springs, Ohio, where she told classmates in 1978 that she wanted "to devote my life to experimental culture." She then attended the School of the Art Institute of Chicago, where she received a BFA. She earned her MFA degree from Pratt Institute in 1983. She worked as a gallerist in SoHo including Donald Wren, Marcuse Pfeifer and Brent Sikkema galleries. where she was a successful art dealer. Married to Joaquin Fiol, whom she met at the Mudd Club, in 1991 she chose for several years to be a stay-at-home mother and pursued a career as a multi-media painter-photographer "cultivating a style that superimposed layers of paint over her original photos in an attempt to capture the 'ecstatic moment' of her subject material." She returned to the avant-garde community when she and her husband divorced, and was a fixture of the avant-jazz club Tonic on the Lower East Side. In 2001 she created the cover of Marc Ribot's 2001 album,'Saints.' and in the same year she co-launched Issue Management, an agency to represent photographers in a former garage on 6th Street between Avenues B and C in the East Village. The space allowed the earliest incarnation of ISSUE Project Room, which attracted artists needing space for presentation of experimental music and multi-disciplinary performances. Fiol's new venue quickly established a place in the small circuit of downtown clubs and makeshift theaters that specialize in the fringes of contemporary music As the reviewer for 'The New Yorker' magazine put it, "Cagean conceptualists rubbed shoulders with free-jazz virtuosos, indie-rock sound terrorists, and diehard modernists."

== Growth of ISSUE Project Room ==
As the costs of real estate rose on the Lower East Side, many marginal businesses were forced to fold, but Fiol adapted. "We lost a lot of creative space [in the city] — the Cooler went under, Tonic went under, but Suzanne provided a space for creative art that challenged and pushed the limits," Sonic Youth co-founder Lee Ranaldo told The Brooklyn Paper. "She was an incredibly dynamic and creative mover and shaker."

Fiol moved her operation to Brooklyn, finding space in the largely vacant industrial area along the Gowanus Canal. Composer Stephan Moore designed, built and donated a signature 16-channel speaker system for Fiol. The space attracted downtown musicians, and "the raw, bare space became a hot house of loud noise, strange sounds and electronic connections to another world." Fiol said she attracted "the downtown improvisers, the experimental musicians, the sound artists, people making new chamber music. …When I worked in my studio, this is what I listened to. All sorts of new, weird music."

Although "Fiol was known for her innovative transformation of unlikely spaces into performance spaces recognized for their warmth and great sound," the Brooklyn neighborhood into which Fiol transplanted her avant-garde hipster culture has its own unvarnished quality. One reviewer described the experience of approaching the current facility:

To get to the Issue Project Room, proceed past Carroll Street's red brick row houses and their wrought iron gratings, past the building marked NYC 2WAY INT.L, until you come, right before the canal, to a medieval-sized gate made of bent iron rods. Duck through the inset door (be careful not to slam it) and make your way through the dirt and grass lot, weaving through the bare winter trees and past the covered-up boat that lies plowed into the ground, as if deposited there by a flood. Look up and you'll see the circular turret of an abandoned oil silo rising high above the canal, concrete and round. Scale the slippery iron steps and look through the glass door: You might see a troupe of matronly women and gray men banging gamelans or bowing zithers; you might see a white man from Harlem with a long beard, a pink bandana, and a black hat hiding his eyes, on his knees, screaming; or you might see, because it's there to see most every night, a marginally well-heeled crowd of men and women, glasses predominate, eyes closed, often cross-legged on the carpet, slowly nodding in empathy at the spectacle before them.

Performers at ISSUE Project Room range across the musical spectrum, from high-profile Moby to "Peter Walker—the 1960s Village legend who once served as Timothy Leary's music director …like a long-vanished magician …Other forgotten artists—like Gamelan Son of Lion, a Folkways recording troupe from the '70s—and relatively new ones—such as the Locust hypno-quintet Function (have performed at ISSUE Project Room, as have)…downtown composer Rhys Chatham (reunited) with alumni from his storied '70s and early '80s downtown guitar trios, including Kim Gordon, Thurston Moore, and Lee Ranaldo, of Sonic Youth; vaunted New York artist Robert Longo; fellow Table of the Elements recording artists Jonathan Kane and David Daniell; Sir Richard Bishop of the Sun City Girls and Harlem's No-Neck Blues Band" and Sunburned Hand of the Man." The No Neck Blues Band "hung an armchair upside down from the ceiling and played percussion against the floor, walls, and ceiling while the audience huddled around in a crooked semi-circle until performer and audience were nearly indistinguishable."

== Future of ISSUE Project Room ==
In 2009 Fiol submitted the winning proposal for the development of a prime location in downtown Brooklyn. The building, at 110 Livingston Street, was designed by the famed beaux arts architectural firm McKim, Mead & White and opened in 1926. It was headquarters of the Board of Education until the Board was dismantled under the administration of mayor Michael Bloomberg. The city sold the building in 2003 to the Brooklyn developer Two Trees Management for more than $45 million.

As part of a deal for the private development of the site, Two Trees agreed to contribute the ground floor space. Fiol received a 20-year rent-free lease on the 4,800-square-foot (450 m^{2}) space, contingent on raising $1.6 million for renovation. At the time of her death in October 2009, she was only slightly short of that goal, largely due to the contribution of a $1.1 million grant from the discretionary funds of Marty Markowitz, the Brooklyn borough president and a fundraising art auction at Phillips de Pury gallery in Chelsea, to which over a hundred well-known artists donated works, raising $350,000.

The Board of Trustees of ISSUE Project Room, which includes actor/director Steve Buscemi, musicians Tony Conrad and R. Luke DuBois, and visual artist Robert Longo, is continuing with fundraising. An Art Advisory Board is headed by Yoko Ono.
