= Hotel des Arts =

Hotel in San Francisco, California

- Location in Central San Francisco Hotel des Arts (California) Hotel des Arts (the United States)

General information
- Location: United States, 447 Bush Street; San Francisco, California
- Coordinates: 37.79055°N 122.40494°W
- Opening: 2005

Technical details
- Floor count: 4

Other information
- Number of rooms: 51
- Number of restaurants: Le Central

Website
- www.sfhoteldesarts.com

Hotel des Arts is a boutique hotel in San Francisco, California. When it opened in 2005, 16 of its 51 rooms were painted by local artists–today 38 rooms are. Materials used include wall-mounted vinyl records, plastic bags, graffiti, fabrics, three-dimensional art work, and even installations.

== Rooms ==
Room 404, painted by Tim Gaskin, was the source of some controversy. The walls are adorned with larger-than-life Louis Vuitton logos as well as an image of Madonna. Louis Vuitton sent a cease-and-desist letter to the hotel ordering them to remove the logos, but the hotel refused and instead held a special public exhibition to display the room. Now the hotel's website has a disclaimer on the page for the room, which states, "Please Note: Room 404 is painted with fine art murals by Tim Gaskin. Hotel des Arts is in no way associated with any of the companies or celebrities whose trademarks and likenesses appear in the murals."

=== Room 311 ===
Room 311 was painted by the French artist Antoine Merger, who worked under the name Punkadelik. The room was part of the Hotel des Arts' Painted Rooms series. Contemporary descriptions identify Punkadelik as the artist and describe the work as using fluorescent paint and ultraviolet lighting.

== Featured artists ==
Hotel des Arts roster of featured artists include:

- Alayna
- Anthony Skirvin
- Apex
- Bask and Tes One
- Bloum Cardenas and Regis Silva
- Brad Alder
- Brian Barneclo
- Brian Ermanski
- Buff Monster
- Casey O'Connell
- Chaz – London Police
- Chor Boogie and Maya Hayuk
- Chris Pastras and Josh Feldman
- Chris Ybarra
- Damon Soule
- Dave Kinsey
- David Choe
- David DeRosa
- Eric Orr
- Jeremy Fish
- Jeremyville
- Jet Martinez
- Kate Durkin
- Kelly Ording
- Kelly Tunstall
- MATSU-MTP and MISK
- Nome Edonna
- Owen Maigret
- Peat Wolleager
- Plasticgod
- * Punkadelik
- Sam Flores
- Scatha Allison
- Shepard Fairey and Tricia Choi
- Sugarluxe
- Terrance Hughes
- Tim Gaskin
- Vinyl Killer
