= White Bird (soundtrack) =

White Bird (Original Motion Picture Soundtrack)

Film score by Thomas Newman
- Released: October 4, 2024
- Recorded: 2021–2022
- Studio: Abbey Road Studios, London
- Genre: Film score
- Length: 76:56
- Label: Lakeshore
- Producer: Thomas Newman

Thomas Newman chronology
Elemental (2023)	White Bird (2024)	The Thursday Murder Club (2025)

White Bird (Original Motion Picture Soundtrack) is the film score to the 2024 war drama film White Bird directed by Marc Forster, which is a spin-off prequel and a sequel to Wonder (2017). It stars Ariella Glaser, Orlando Schwerdt, Bryce Gheisar (reprising his role as Julian Albams from Wonder), Gillian Anderson and Helen Mirren. The film score is composed by Thomas Newman and conducted by John Ashton Thomas and Ben Parry. It was recorded at the Abbey Road Studios in London. It was released through Lakeshore Records on October 4, 2024.

== Release ==
In October 2021, it was announced that Thomas Newman would compose the film score for White Bird. Newman initially started working on the film before the COVID-19 pandemic halted production. After which Newman installed portable Pro Tools rigs in some of his key players' studios and went through remote recording sessions where he had to interact with the musicians through Zoom and Source-Connect platforms. Despite the turbulent process, like technical glitches and more internet connections related to the audio listening and latency, they felt it became easier having adjusted to the normalcy. After the pandemic restrictions eased, Newman recorded the score at the Abbey Road Studios in London. The soundtrack was released through Lakeshore Records on October 4, 2024.

== Track listing ==
No.	Title	Length
1.	"Sara Blum"	0:36
2.	"Aubervilliers-aux-Bois"	2:18
3.	"Imagination"	0:39
4.	"Mlle Petitjean"	0:36
5.	"Rose"	3:10
6.	"Dress Shoes"	0:58
7.	"Stay Very Quiet Run Very Fast"	7:39
8.	"Deep as Your Knees"	3:26
9.	"Julien Beaumier"	3:18
10.	"Zebra"	1:19
11.	"Days Weeks"	1:28
12.	"Dannevilliers"	1:55
13.	"Winter Spring"	1:47
14.	"Tourteau"	3:53
15.	"Time to Heal"	1:38
16.	"(Wonder Story)"	2:16
17.	"Puppet Show"	0:57
18.	"Cinema Mernuit"	2:13
19.	"Dream"	1:11
20.	"New York"	1:40
21.	"The Soul of the World"	1:47
22.	"Late for School"	3:31
23.	"The Giant Wolves"	3:00
24.	"A Dark and Scary Place"	2:31
25.	"Sea of Bluebells"	3:14
26.	"Clinging to Hope"	2:02
27.	"August 1944"	2:59
28.	"Vivienne"	0:46
29.	"The End of My Story"	2:42
30.	"Vive l'Humanité"	3:08
31.	"White Bird"	3:54
32.	"Songbird"	2:37
33.	"Little Bird" (Ariella Glaser)	1:48
Total length:		76:56

== Reception ==
James Southall of Movie Wave wrote "White Bird is so full of class: it has it oozing out of its every pore. It is the work of a master film composer four decades into his career, so inevitably there is a feel of familiarity to it – I wonder if it is actually that very familiarity that makes it so appealing. Yes, the album runs too long but even so it's one of the year's finest without question – I just want to keep playing it again and again, completely beholden to its many charms. Bravo Thomas Newman – this just might be my favourite of 2024 so far." Dennis Harvey of Variety wrote "if Thomas Newman's piano-and-strings-driven score is unmemorable, it like much else here makes a virtue of restraint." Pete Hammond of Deadline Hollywood wrote "veteran composer Thomas Newman not only contributes another lilting score, but also a haunting song (with lyrics by Palacio) sung by the young stars, as well as over the end credits." Asha Pruitt of SLUG wrote "the sumptuous orchestral score by the great Thomas Newman is more than enough to make it satisfying moviegoing." Lovia Gyarkye of The Hollywood Reporter called it an "endearing" score. Odie Henderson of The Boston Globe criticized it as an "intrusive score".

== Personnel ==
Credits adapted from Film Music Reporter:

- Music composer and producer: Thomas Newman
- Electronic programming: Julia Newman
- Assistant engineers: Jeff Gartenbaum, George Oulton
- Recording: Suspect AGB
- Additional recording: Moises Ignacio Garcia
- Mixing: Recoil prod.
- Music editor: Shinnosuke Miyazawa
- Temp score editor: Jon Mooney
- Conductors: John Ashton Thomas, Ben Parry
- Orchestrations: J. A. C. Redford
- Orchestra contractor: Lucy Whalley for Isobel Griffiths Ltd.
- Concertmaster and violin solos: Thomas Bowes
- Instrumental soloists: Steve Tavaglione, George Doering
- Orchestra recordist: Gordon Davidson
- Pro tools operator: Larry Mah
- Music preparation: Reprise Music Services, Jill Streater (Global Music Service)
- Music librarians: Jill Streater, Ann Barnard
- Music contractor: Leslie Morris
- Score consultant: Celeste Chada
- Music clearance and licensing: Matt Lilley & Ann-Marie Verdi / MCL Music Services, Inc.
