= Wildlife of Brooklyn =

Flora and fauna of Brooklyn

Brooklyn is the most populous of New York City's five boroughs, but it is home to a wide range of wildlife. The borough has a land area of 69.38 square miles (179.7 km^{2}).

There is no universally accepted definition for "wildlife". This article focuses on animal species which are not commonly found in an urban environment. This article does not cover animals commonly found in urban settings, such as rats, pigeons, or cockroaches.

Wildlife sightings in New York City have increased in recent years due to environmental restoration efforts.

== Mammals ==
=== Beavers ===
North American beavers were once native to the New York City area but disappeared in the early 19th century due to being trapped for their fur and deforestation reducing their habitat. In 2007, a beaver was spotted in the Bronx, marking the first time a beaver was found in New York City in 200 years. Since then, beavers have been spotted in Staten Island, Manhattan, and Brooklyn.

In 2022, dogwalkers at Domino Park in Williamsburg, Brooklyn spotted a beaver running towards the Williamsburg Bridge. Two officers from the New York Police Department unsuccessfully attempted to capture the beaver in a cardboard box.

Wildlife NYC, a campaign launched by the city, recommends that New Yorkers observe beavers from a distance. The campaign tracks beaver sightings.

=== Deer ===
Brooklyn has no established deer population, but deer have been known to swim over from Staten Island, which has a small population of white-tailed deer subject to a $6.6 million vasectomy program intended to staunch growth.

In 2020, a deer originating from Staten Island was spotted running around Gravesend, Brooklyn. After a several-hour police chase, the deer was sedated and returned to Staten Island.

In 2011, three deer appeared near the base of the Brooklyn side of the Verrazzano–Narrows Bridge. One deer's rear legs were bound with twine.
