= David Walentas =

American real-estate developer

- Born: 1938 (age 87–88); Rochester, New York, US
- Education: University of Virginia
- Occupation: Real estate developer
- Spouse: Jane Zimmerman
- Children: 1 son

David Walentas (born 1938) is an American billionaire real estate developer. Walentas founded Two Trees Management in 1968.

== Early life and education ==
Walentas was born in Rochester, New York. His father was of Lithuanian descent. When he was five, his postal worker father suffered a stroke in his 30s and was left paralyzed. His mother had to work two jobs, and David and his older brother Peter went to live on nearby farms, "milking cows and shoveling shit," as "an indentured orphan." He eventually went to the University of Virginia and received a bachelor's degree in mechanical engineering. He worked at Thule Air Base in Greenland as a laborer for a summer to pay off his student loans and then spent time traveling through Europe. After he returned to the U.S., he accepted a job with the Peace Corps but instead attended the University of Virginia Darden School of Business where he graduated in 1964. He then took a job with Singer Corporation where he worked in Japan and Australia. While in Asia, he met a schoolteacher from Rochester who was teaching in the Philippines; they married in Japan but the marriage only lasted a year.

== Career ==
Walentas returned to the US and worked for W. R. Grace and Company and partnered with Grace family member J. Frederic Byers III (who would later marry Bill Paley's daughter, Hillary) who bought an apartment building in 1968 on 104th and Manhattan Avenue. They expanded into SoHo and NoHo focusing on converting industrial buildings into apartments or coops. In 1978, his partner died. Intent on expanding into Dumbo, Brooklyn, which he thought was the next hot neighborhood, he was able to get $6 million in funding from Ronald Lauder and Leonard Lauder (who he had worked with in the past in the purchase of the Silk Building) and borrowed an additional $6 million which enabled him to purchase two million square feet of property, almost the entire neighborhood. As the neighborhood was zoned industrial, his plan was to convert the buildings into back office space for Wall Street. He was on the verge of signing a deal with Lewis Glucksman of Lehman Brothers but it collapsed after their sale to American Express. At the time, Governor Mario Cuomo was trying to preserve manufacturing jobs and offered Walentas a deal, the Department of Labor would move its operations to Dumbo if he would give existing manufacturers a 10-year lease. After the 10 years passed, the bank that owned the $20 million mortgage on the Dumbo properties went bankrupt and the mortgage was sold it HSBC who then sold it to Walentas at a discounted price of $6 million. In 1995, he was able to get the city to change the zoning to residential. In 2024, he completed the Domino Sugar Refinery in Williamsburg, Brooklyn.

With his Two Trees Management company, Walentas has developed the DUMBO area of Brooklyn. In August 2020, he had a net worth of US$2.2 billion, ranking him No. 378 on the Forbes 400 list of America's richest people.

== Personal life ==
Walentas was married with one son and lives in New York City. He is "a passionate polo player". His wife Jane (née Zimmerman) was an artist. Jane died in 2021. Reflecting on his marriage, Walentas stated that it was the "best deal I ever made". His son Jed Walentas is CEO of Two Trees.
