= ISSUE Project Room =

Music venue in Brooklyn, New York

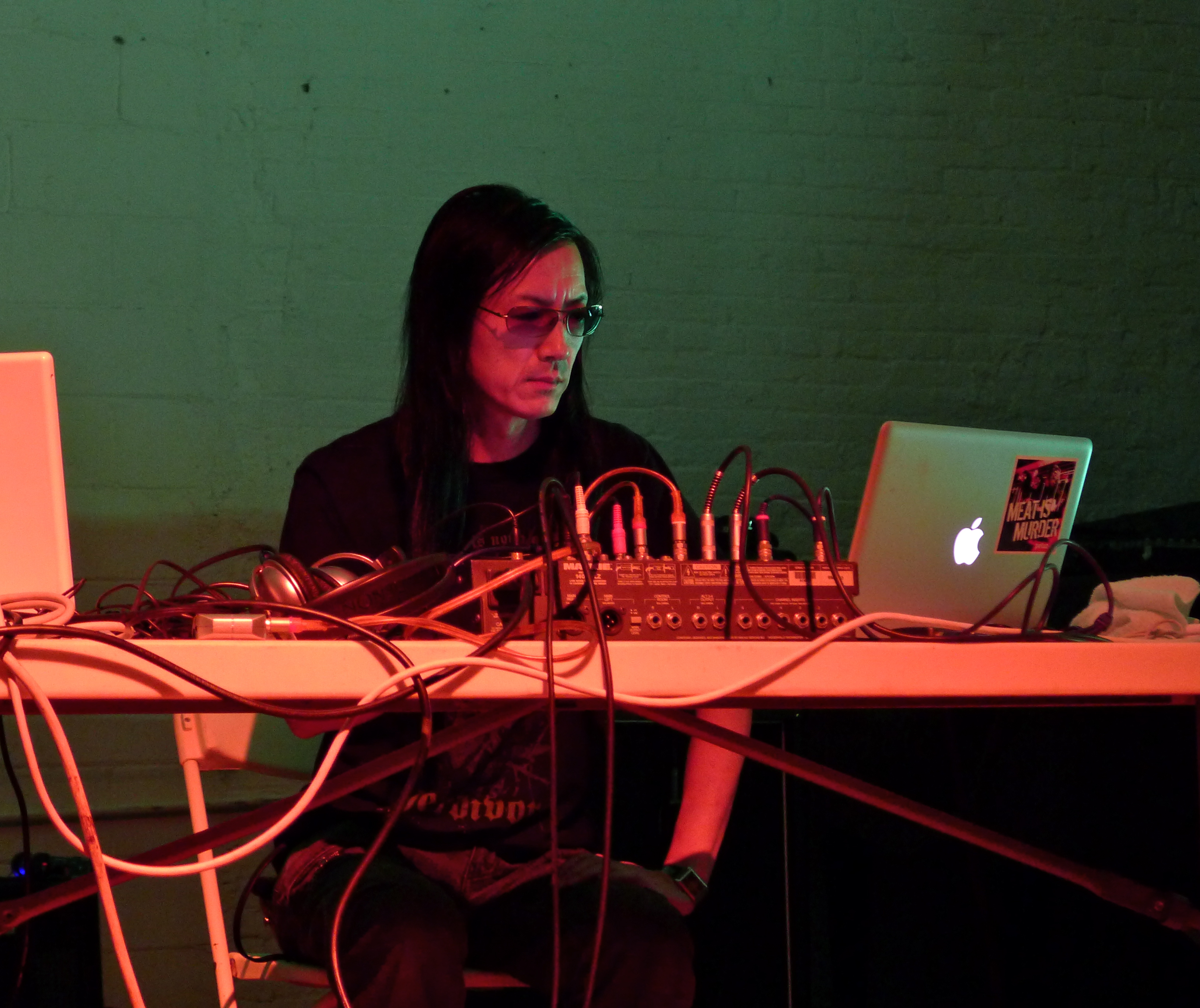
- Merzbow performing at ISSUE Project Room on 23 September 2010.
- Interactive map of ISSUE Project Room
- Address: 22 Boerum Street; Brooklyn; U.S.
- Location: Brooklyn, New York, U.S.
- Type: Performance Space
- Public transit: Jay Street–MetroTech station, Borough Hall/Court Street station, New York City Subway

Website
- issueprojectroom.org

ISSUE Project Room (often shortened to ISSUE) is a music venue in Brooklyn, New York, founded in 2003 by Suzanne Fiol. ISSUE Project room owns a theatre in 110 Livingston Street in Downtown Brooklyn. The venue supports a wide variety of contemporary performance, specializing in presenting experimental and avant-garde music.

== History and programming ==
ISSUE Project Room began in 2003 with a special concert curated by ISSUE's late founder Suzanne Fiol and musician Marc Ribot honoring the work of Frantz Casseus, the father of Haitian Classical music. The venue started in a garage space in the East Village of Manhattan, as a "project room" to feature experimental performances presented by Fiol's photography agency, Issue Management. Performances by Debbie Harry and the Jazz Passengers, Elliott Sharp, Anthony Coleman and dozens of others soon followed.

By 2005, ISSUE was presenting 100 arts events annually featuring artists from several disciplines. At that time, ISSUE moved into a two-story silo in near the Gowanus Canal. Site-specific works utilizing a specially made 16-channel hemispherical speaker system made by sound artist Stephan Moore were added to ISSUE's programming at the Silo. In 2007, ISSUE relocated to the Old American Can Factory due to a rent increase at its Silo.

In 2008, ISSUE entered and won a competition for a twenty-year rent-free lease to the 4,800 sq. ft. theater located at 22 Boerum Place, on the ground floor of the historic 110 Livingston Street building in downtown Brooklyn, to create a "Carnegie Hall for the avant-garde".

Fiol died of cancer in October 2009.

In June 2012, Zach Layton and Nick Hallett performed Anthony Braxton's opera Trillium E, Pauline Oliveros's eight-handed piano piece "Gathering Together", and the New York City premiere of two works by French electro-acoustic artist Luc Ferrari.

In 2012, ISSUE began to work with the NYC Department of Design and Construction to prepare for renovations. Notable performances at the Boerum Place theater include Cecil Taylor's first performance in Brooklyn, a three-night series of Philip Glass in collaboration with Stephin Merritt, Laurie Anderson, and Jon Gibson, Keiji Haino performing solo and with Fushitsusha founding member Tamio Shiraishi, and the PAN_ACT festival, which brought together over 30 artists in conjunction with the Berlin-based label PAN.

ISSUE completed its capital campaign in 2012 by raising over $4,000,000 to renovate its space, scheduled to begin in 2014.

In March 2020, ISSUE suspended all in-person programming due to the COVID-19 pandemic. During this time, ISSUE commissioned over 250 artists for free online programs.

In Fall 2021, a limited amount of in-person, indoor and outdoor events resumed.
