= 110 Livingston Street =

Residential building in Brooklyn, New York

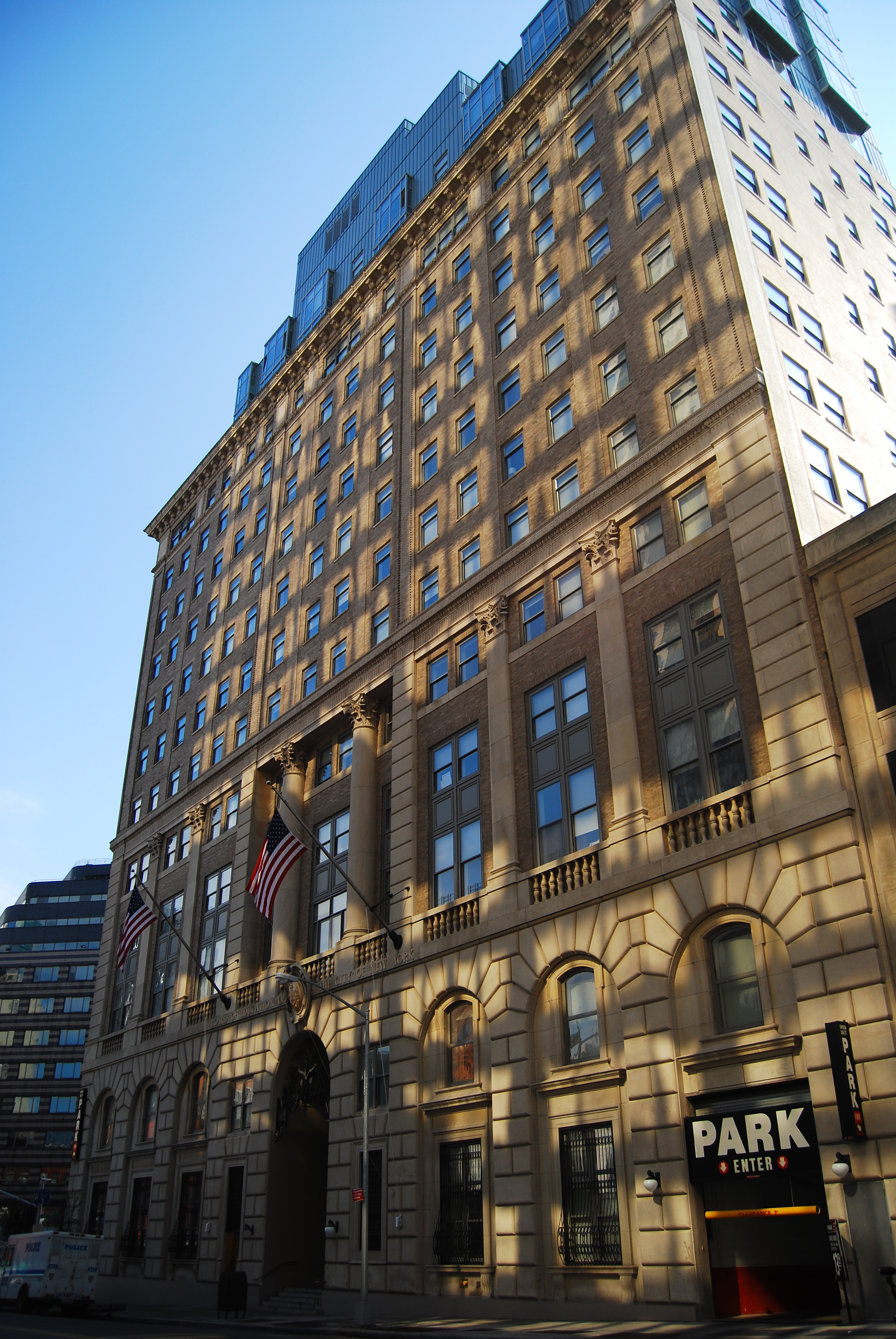

General information
- Status: Completed
- Architectural style: Beaux Arts
- Location: 110 Livingston Street, Brooklyn, New York, U.S.
- Coordinates: 40.691000°N 73.990000°W

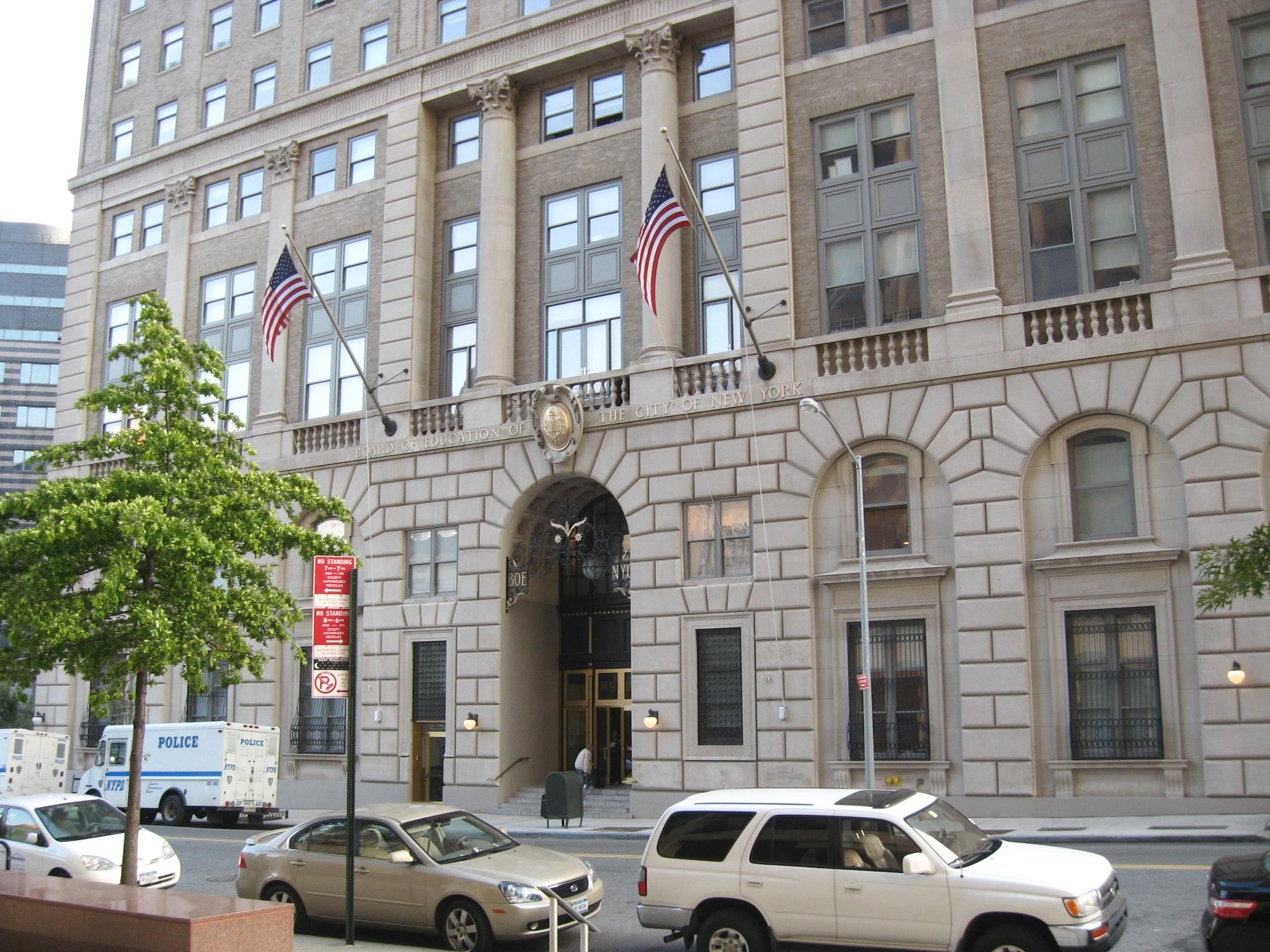
110 Livingston Street

110 Livingston Street is a Beaux Arts-style building located in Downtown Brooklyn, New York City, New York, United States.

== History ==
The building was designed by the architectural firm McKim, Mead & White, and was built in 1926 to serve as the headquarters for the Elks organization, including amenities such as a pool, banquet hall, and bowling alleys. The building has a limestone and terra cotta facade, with Renaissance-revival style features including balustrades, egg-and-dart ornamentation, and Corinthian columns.

In 1940, the building was converted to serve as the New York City Board of Education headquarters. Over decades of use by the Board of Education, the building became known for the entrenched bureaucracy and dysfunction of its occupants, and Michael Cooper of The New York Times stated that the building's name eventually came to symbolize the failings of the New York City school system, as "more than a location or a shorthand name for the institution it housed, the city's Board of Education. It symbolized a state of mind, a failed system that was at once imperious and impervious."

In 2003, the government of New York City sold the building to Two Trees Management, a primary developer of the DUMBO neighborhood, for development as luxury residential apartments, as part of development efforts taking place throughout Downtown Brooklyn. Several floors were added to the structure, and the courtyard was decorated with a trompe-l'œil mural of architectural features by muralist Richard Haas. The interior lobby space, including a coffered ceiling, has been restored by the architecture firm Beyer Blinder Belle, and a historic theater space on the ground floor is intended to be used by ISSUE Project Room, a local arts organization.
