= Chor Boogie =

American painter (born 1979)

- Born: Jason Lamar Hailey; 1979 (age 46–47); Oceanside, California, U.S.
- Education: Self-taught
- Known for: Fine art spray paint murals, teacher
- Movement: Spray paint fine art, color therapy Modern Hieroglyphics

Chor Boogie (born Jason Lamar Hailey) is an American spray paint artist. He is based in San Francisco, California. He has exhibited internationally and has been commissioned for public art projects in the USA, China and Australia.

== Early life ==
Chor Boogie was born Jason Lamar Hailey in Oceanside, California in 1979. He was introduced to art in general at the age of five by a teacher in grade school, after which he decided he wanted to be an artist when he grew up. He first used spray paint at age 10, and chose the name "Chore" for himself at age 11 (later dropping the "e") to describe his enjoyment of art from a professional standpoint. He did not receive formal art training, because spray paint was discouraged as art.

== Career ==
Chor volunteered as the director of mural projects for Writers Block, a San Diego group that created art with high school students. He curated shows at the San Diego Museum of Art and the city's children's museum.

Primarily an autodidact, Chor Boogie lists as influences Michelangelo, Da Vinci, Rembrandt, Klimt, Van Gogh, and Salvador Dalí, along with early spray paint mentors from the Hip hop culture PHASE 2, Vulcan, and Riff 170.

Chor Boogie paints exclusively with spray paint, in sizes ranging from miniatures (such as a 2010 range of 2-by-2-inch "boogie birds") to building-sized murals. He refers to his colorful style and its intended spiritual and emotional impact on viewers as "color therapy".

His first major commission was a rock wall he painted in his early teens for a series of motivational speeches by Anthony Robbins. He since had public art projects commissioned in San Diego (a mural at The New Children's Museum, as well as the San Diego Museum of Contemporary Art), Beijing, China (for the 2008 Summer Olympics) and Melbourne, Australia. He designed and worked with volunteers to paint Edgewood at the Edge of the World, a 500-foot-long (150 m) mural in the Edgewood neighborhood of Northeast, Washington, D.C. He has held shows in Mexico City, Brazil, and Dubai, traveled with musicians for live painting, and has painted a number of spray paint portraits of celebrities including Hugh Hefner, Jay-Z, Ol dirty bastard, and Rage Against the Machine.

One of his more prominent works, The Color Therapy of Perception, is a 100-foot (30 m) mural commissioned by the San Francisco Arts Commission's "Arts in Storefronts" project to improve the city's blighted Tenderloin neighborhood. While painting that work he was stabbed by thieves trying to steal his painting supplies. Mayor Gavin Newsom visited Chor Boogie in the hospital, and helped complete the painting.

Corporate Zombies is located in New York, NY at 5 Bryant Park. The building's owners commissioned Chor Boogie to paint a mural inside the empty space on the corner of 40th Street and Avenue of the Americas, as part of the lot's rebranding as 5 Bryant Park.

In 2022 Boogie and his wife, Elizabeth Bast, opened Soul Centro, one of many psychedelic retreats in Costa Rica. In August 2024, a participant died during an iboga ceremony held at the retreat, leading to a front page article in La Nación newspaper. The incident prompted public scrutiny of the retreat's safety practices and its handling of medical emergencies.
