= Silk Building =

Building in Manhattan, New York

Coordinates: 40.7280°N 73.9938°W

The Silk Building is a building located at 14 East 4th Street in the NoHo neighborhood of New York City. It has 12 floors that contain 55 apartments. It takes up a whole city block on 4th Street and stretches between Broadway and Lafayette with entrances on both streets.

Built in 1912 as a factory for producing silk garments, it was converted into a condominium building in 1982. Since then, it was the residence of global stars such as Keith Richards, Cher and Britney Spears. Its penthouse is the most famous four-storey quadruplex in New York.

== History ==
The Silk Building was designed by Clinton & Russel Architects in the Italian Renaissance style. Construction began in 1908 and was completed in 1912.

The building was initially constructed to be a factory space for workers producing silk garments. The only remaining traces of the factory are the two friezes in the lobby. The first, called Silk Textile Workers of New York, shows a silk manufacture with female workers performing various tasks. The second frieze, called Silk Production in China, shows how silk itself was traditionally produced in China.

At the time, many buildings in the neighborhood, such as the American Thread Building or the Spinning Wheel Building, contained clothing manufacturers. Over the decades, they have all been repurposed into office buildings or, as in the case of the Silk Building, into luxury residential buildings.

In 1982, the Silk Building was bought by David Walentas of Two Trees Management Company. He developed it into a condominium-style building with retail spaces, designed by Beyer Blinder Belle. The condominiums range from studios to four bedrooms with high-beamed ceilings. Many of the layouts are duplexes or triplexes.

== Tenants ==
An important event for the whole neighborhood was the leasing of the Silk Building's entire retail spaces to Tower Records in 1983. Their music store became a major destination store in New York, attracting rock musicians and other celebrities.

The first global stars living in the building were Keith Richards and Cher. Richards owned two floors, one a complete recording studio. He lived a secluded life and rarely left the building till late at night to avoid fans.

The Silk Building was the New York home of both the writer Bret Easton Ellis and of the main character of his novel Imperial Bedrooms.

Rap mogul Russell Simmons resided at PH 1108 until 1996. Britney Spears lived in the penthouse until 2006. In 2010, Alan Colmes sold his triplex apartment there.

In 2010, New York University purchased a 12,851-square-foot condominium spanning the entire third floor. The space is used for back-office purposes by the university, including the NYU Shanghai office in New York, as well as housing an affiliate of the NYU Steinhardt School of Culture, Education and Human Development.
