= Domino Sugar Refinery =

Development and former refinery in New York City

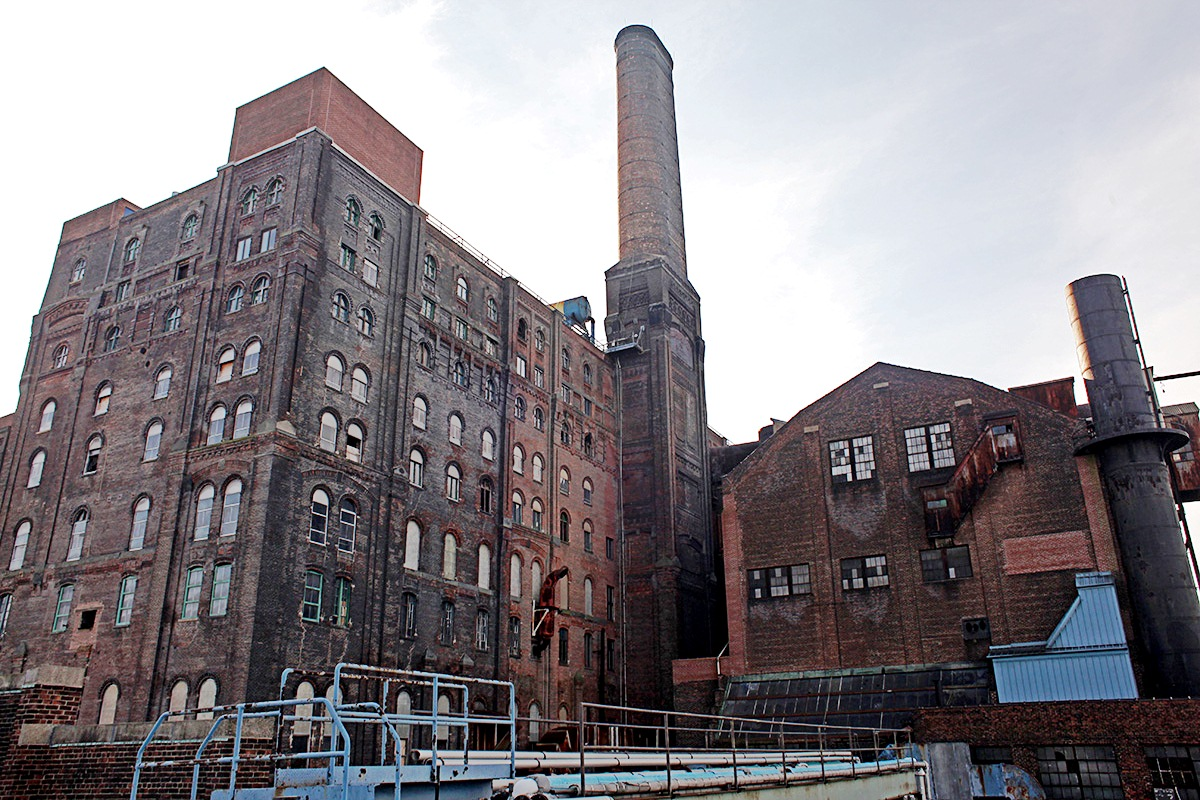
- The refinery seen in 2012; the filter, pan, and finishing house (left) structure is still standing, while ancillary structures (right) have been demolished
- Interactive map of Domino Sugar Refinery
- Location: Brooklyn, New York, US
- Address: Kent Avenue
- Coordinates: 40°42′52″N 73°58′03″W
- Status: Under construction
- Opening: 1882 (refinery); 2017 (325 Kent); 2018 (Domino Park); 2019 (One South First and Ten Grand); 2024 (One Domino Square)
- Use: Mixed-use

Companies
- Architect: Theodore A. Havemeyer, Thomas Winslow and J. E. James (refinery); Practice for Architecture and Urbanism (refinery renovation); Audrey Matlock Architects (325 Kent); Cookfox (One South First and Ten Grand); Annabelle Selldorf (One Domino Square)
- Developer: Two Trees Management
- Planner: SHoP Architects

Technical details
- Cost: $3 billion
- Buildings: 5
- Leasable area: 600,000 square feet (56,000 m^{2}) of office space, 200,000 square feet (19,000 m^{2}) of retail space
- Built: July 1883
- Operated: 1856 – 2004
- Industry: Sugar industry
- Products: Sugar
- Employees: 4,500 (1919)
- Architect: Theodore A. Havemeyer, Thomas Winslow, and J. E. James
- Buildings: 6
- Owner: Two Trees Management

New York City Landmark
- Designated: September 25, 2007
- Reference no.: 2268

The Domino Sugar Refinery is a mixed-use development and former sugar refinery along the East River in the neighborhood of Williamsburg in Brooklyn, New York, United States. When active as a refinery, it was operated by the Havemeyer family's American Sugar Refining Company, which produced Domino brand sugar and was one of several sugar factories on the East River in northern Brooklyn.

The family's first refinery in Williamsburg opened in 1856 and was operated by German-born Frederick C. Havemeyer Jr., the son of American Sugar's founder. After a fire destroyed the original structures on South Third Street and Kent Avenue, the current complex was built in 1882 by Theodore A. Havemeyer, Thomas Winslow, and J. E. James. The American Sugar Refining Company grew to control most of the sugar industry in the United States by the late 19th century, with the Brooklyn refinery as its largest plant. Many different types of sugar were refined at the facility, and it employed up to 4,500 workers at its peak in 1919. Demand started to decline in the 1920s with advances in sugar refining and the construction of other facilities, but the refinery continued to operate until 2004.

In the early 21st century, the refinery was redeveloped as office space, residential towers, and parkland. The complex's filter, pan, and finishing house was made a New York City designated landmark in 2007, because of its historical significance as one of several industrial concerns on Brooklyn's waterfront. After the failure of an initial redevelopment proposal by CPC Resources, SHoP Architects proposed another design in 2013, which was approved the next year. Demolition of the non-landmark structures in the refinery began shortly afterward, and the first new tower in the development project opened in 2017. As of 2026, the refinery redevelopment consists of four completed towers; the Filter, Pan, and Finishing House; and a waterside park called Domino Park.

== Refinery ==
The industrial waterfront of Brooklyn was developed in the 19th century with the construction of major shipping hubs such as Red Hook's Atlantic Basin, the Brooklyn Navy Yard, and Industry City. The village of Williamsburgh in northern Brooklyn was incorporated on the bank of the East River in 1827, with most of the commercial enterprises located on the waterfront, and Williamsburg grew rapidly after 1855, when it became part of the city of Brooklyn (itself later subsumed into the City of Greater New York).

German-born cousins Frederick C. Havemeyer and William Havemeyer, of the Havemeyer family, had established their first sugar refinery on Vandam Street in modern-day Hudson Square, Manhattan, in 1807. The original refinery occupied a lot of 30 by 40 feet (9.1 by 12.2 m), but by the 1840s it had expanded to ten stories and occupied the whole city block. Frederick C. Havemeyer Jr. (1807–1891), who joined the Havemeyer family business in 1823, helped the operation grow into a large sugar-refining corporation.

=== Original facility ===
The Havemeyer family's sugar-refining operations had outgrown its Manhattan plant by the mid-19th century. The first member of the Havemeyer family to open a facility in Williamsburg was John C. Havemeyer, Frederick Jr.'s nephew. At the end of 1856, John C. Havemeyer and Charles E. Bertrand co-founded Havemeyer & Bertrand at the intersection of modern-day Kent Avenue (Note: Kent Avenue was known as First Street before 1881.) and South 3rd Street. (Note: According to the Brooklyn Times-Union, Frederick C. Havemeyer Jr. bought land at that intersection in 1858.) The firm assumed the name Havemeyer, Townsend & Company in 1858, then Havemeyers & Elder in 1863. The refinery employed several Havemeyer family members, including Theodore, Henry, Hector, and Charles, the latter two of whom later formed their own refinery. The Havemeyers & Elder refinery, also called the Yellow Sugar House, was the largest of the Havemeyer family plants. According to sketches, the complex included a five-story building, two single-story buildings, and a standalone chimney. During 1863 and 1865, the Havemeyers bought two lots between South 2nd and South 4th streets for expansion of the facility.

Several other refineries were subsequently built in Williamsburg, making it into the world's largest sugar-refining center at that time. By 1870, the neighborhood produced a majority of sugar used within the United States, and by 1881, the Havemeyer refinery processed about three-fourths of all refined sugar in the nation. Because of the depth of the East River in the vicinity of the refinery, shipments of raw sugar from overseas could be loaded directly into the facility. In February 1881, Havemeyers & Elder received a permit from the City of Brooklyn's Bureau of Buildings to add three stories to an existing six-story building on Kent Avenue between South 4th and South 5th streets. That November, Havemeyers & Elder acquired an adjacent parcel, which had previously been leased to rival refiners Wintjen, Dick and Harms. The same month, Theodore Havemeyer submitted plans for a ten-story brick structure, likely a new filter house, to the Bureau of Buildings.

=== Reconstruction ===
Construction on the new filter house was underway when the original refinery burned down on January 8, 1882, destroying the structures between South 3rd and South 4th streets. The fire destroyed several warehouses as well as the 200-by-150-foot (61 by 46 m) building that contained the refinery and finishing house. It caused an estimated $1.5 million in damage, though insurance policies covered about half of the losses, (Note: According to The Washington Post, $783,000) and resulted in the elimination of 1,200 to 2,000 jobs. Its destruction resulted in an increase in sugar prices nationwide.

In February 1882, Theodore Havemeyer purchased a refinery in Red Hook, Brooklyn, so that operations could restart while the new refinery was being erected. The next month, Havemeyers & Elder submitted plans for a new fireproof pan and finishing house measuring 250 by 70 feet (76 by 21 m) to the Bureau of Buildings. According to the Brooklyn Daily Eagle, Theodore Havemeyer supervised the new structures' construction. (Note: The New York City Landmarks Preservation Commission states that the architect was listed as both "T. H." and "F. A." Havemeyer in publications of the time.) Two people were variously cited as being the contractor: a building application in November 1881 mentions Thomas Winslow and J. E. James as the builders, while a subsequent application in March 1882 states that Havemeyer and James were co-architects. The rebuilding was funded in part by insurance money and the sale of assets. The reconstruction was reported to be completed by July 1883. In total, work cost $7 million (equal to $205 million in 2025).

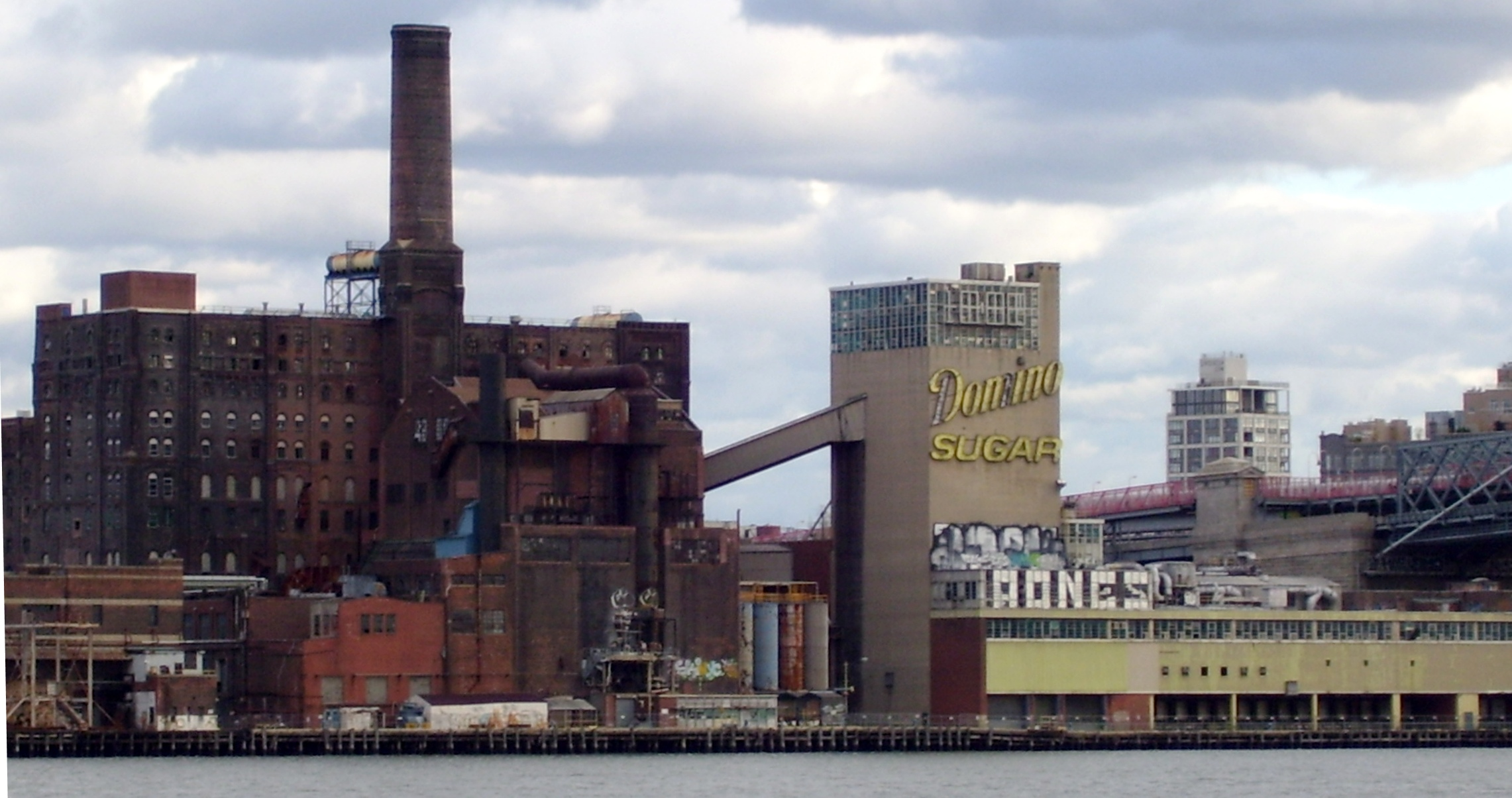
Domino Sugar Refinery behind the East River, as seen from Manhattan to the west

=== Operations ===
The new refinery structure gave the Havemeyer family a large competitive advantage due to its size, and by 1884, the rebuilt plant employed 1,000 men who made 5,000 barrels of sugar daily. The family created the Sugar Refineries Company or Sugar Trust in late 1887. The Sugar Trust was reorganized into the American Sugar Refining Company in 1891 after the previous year's passage of the Sherman Antitrust Act; prior to reorganization, the trust had controlled 98% of the United States' sugar production. An account of the plant's operation in 1894 stated that the plant was "the largest of its kind in the world" with seven buildings on 0.25 square miles (0.65 km^{2}) of land; the refinery employed 3,000 workers and utilized 800 short tons (710 long tons; 730 t) of coal a day, producing approximately 13,000 barrels of sugar per day. In 1896, American Sugar became one of the original twelve companies in the Dow Jones Industrial Average. The company continued to prosper despite further antitrust legislation, and Frederick's son Henry O. Havemeyer renamed the company "Domino's Sugar" in the early 1900s.

Many different types of sugar were refined at the facility. Raw sugar was shipped from forty countries and from Florida. Raw sugar was unloaded from piers along the East River, and mixed with water within the filter house. Then, the mixture was strained, pumped to the thirteenth floor, and placed into 10-foot-tall (3.0 m), 8-foot-wide (2.4 m) circular vats called "blow-ups". Fifty pipes transported the mixture upward. Afterward, the mixture was filtered through "bone black" and canvas layers into circular tanks that measured 20 feet (6.1 m) tall and 9 feet (2.7 m) across. The solution then went into the pan house, where it was boiled at 112 °F (44 °C) in vacuum pans that measured 32 feet (9.8 m) tall and 9 feet (2.7 m) across. Subsequently, the mixture was sent through centrifuges, where it was separated into sugar and molasses. The sugar grains were then taken to the finishing house, where they were separated in granulating machines, then roasted and dried. The roasting and drying process produced either retail-ready products such as cubes, tablets, and syrups, or individual grains that could be used as ingredients in other processes. The sugar products were packed into barrels, which were stored in the warehouses nearby.

The work conditions at the refinery were described as onerous, and the workers were poorly paid, despite working shifts of at least ten hours per day. When the refinery was founded, almost all of the workers were German immigrants, while Irish immigrants were hired as outdoor laborers. Later immigrants came from eastern, northern, and southern Europe, as well as the West Indies. Workers were paid a starting salary of between $1.12 and $1.50 per day (equivalent to between $42 and $56 in 2025 (Note: 1634–1699: McCusker, J. J. (1997). How Much Is That in Real Money? A Historical Price Index for Use as a Deflator of Money Values in the Economy of the United States: Addenda et Corrigenda (PDF). American Antiquarian Society. 1700–1799: McCusker, J. J. (1992). How Much Is That in Real Money? A Historical Price Index for Use as a Deflator of Money Values in the Economy of the United States (PDF). American Antiquarian Society. 1800–present: Federal Reserve Bank of Minneapolis. "Consumer Price Index (estimate) 1800–".)), with 5- or 10-cent pay increases according to tenure. The highest-paid workers at the plant earned between $100 and $150 a month (equivalent to between $3,721 and $5,582 in 2025). According to a 1900 Brooklyn Daily Eagle article, workers were employed for at least eight years on average, and many workers either lived near Kent Avenue or took trolley lines to the refinery. Most laborers at that time lived in boarding houses, though the refinery did have lockers and showers in its basement. Workers were prone to being fired at times of job insecurity, although conditions improved in the early 20th century, when wages were increased and some workers received pensions. Most employees were men, but by 1920, about one of ten workers were women.

=== Later usage ===
==== Early 20th century ====
American Sugar established the East River Terminal Railroad in 1907 to transport sugar between the refinery and the Brooklyn Eastern District Terminal, immediately to the north of the sugar refinery. (Note: The terminal had been established in 1906, though the tracks on Kent Avenue had existed since the late 19th century.) American Sugar believed the refinery to be so fireproof that it did not need insurance. In 1917, during World War I, an explosion destroyed part of the plant, killing between six and twelve workers. A crowd of more than 15,000 people gathered to watch the plant burn. Initially, there was serious concern that the explosion was the work of German agents, because the Germans were the United States' adversary in the war, but the ultimate cause was found to be the ignition of sugar grains in the refinery's machinery.

By 1919, the refinery had over 4,500 paid employees. The company took ownership of a pier at the end of Grand Street, one block north of the refinery, the same year. American Sugar also proposed closing the five short dead-end streets between Grand and South Fifth streets, in order to have full control of the land that comprised the refinery, but withdrew its application following local opposition. American Sugar proposed closing the five streets again in 1923, but this was also opposed by the local population. The company then threatened to move to New Jersey in 1924 over the failure to close the dead-end streets. At the time, the plant had an annual payroll of $3.5 million and manufactured 70,000 long tons (78,000 short tons; 71,000 t) of sugar per year. The New York City government allowed the company to close streets in front of the refinery. (Note: Namely South First and South Fourth Streets, as well as one block of a road along the river between South First and Grand streets.)

In 1926, American Sugar commenced a large renovation of the plant. As part of the project, the 300-foot (91 m) dock was replaced with a 500-foot (150 m) bulkhead, and a new boiler house was erected, as well as a warehouse that could store 25,000 long tons (28,000 short tons; 25,000 t) of sugar. The renovation was completed in 1927. The upgrades had cost $3 million and resulted in increased efficiency in the refinery's operations. Around this time, a large sign with yellow letters spelling "Domino Sugar" was erected on one of the refinery's buildings, facing the East River. By American Sugar's 50th anniversary in 1941, the refinery produced 60 grades of sugars and was a significant source of income to the municipal governments and surrounding community. It was estimated that from 1912 to 1941, the factory paid $156 million in wages, $4 million in taxes, and $2 million for water; accepted sugar from 2,252 ships; and used 3.5 million short tons (3.2 Mt) of coal and 17,537 barrels of oil. The Brooklyn Citizen said in 1941 that the refinery made Brooklyn the center of sugar refining in the United States, similar to how Detroit manufactured cars and Pittsburgh manufactured steel.

==== Decline ====
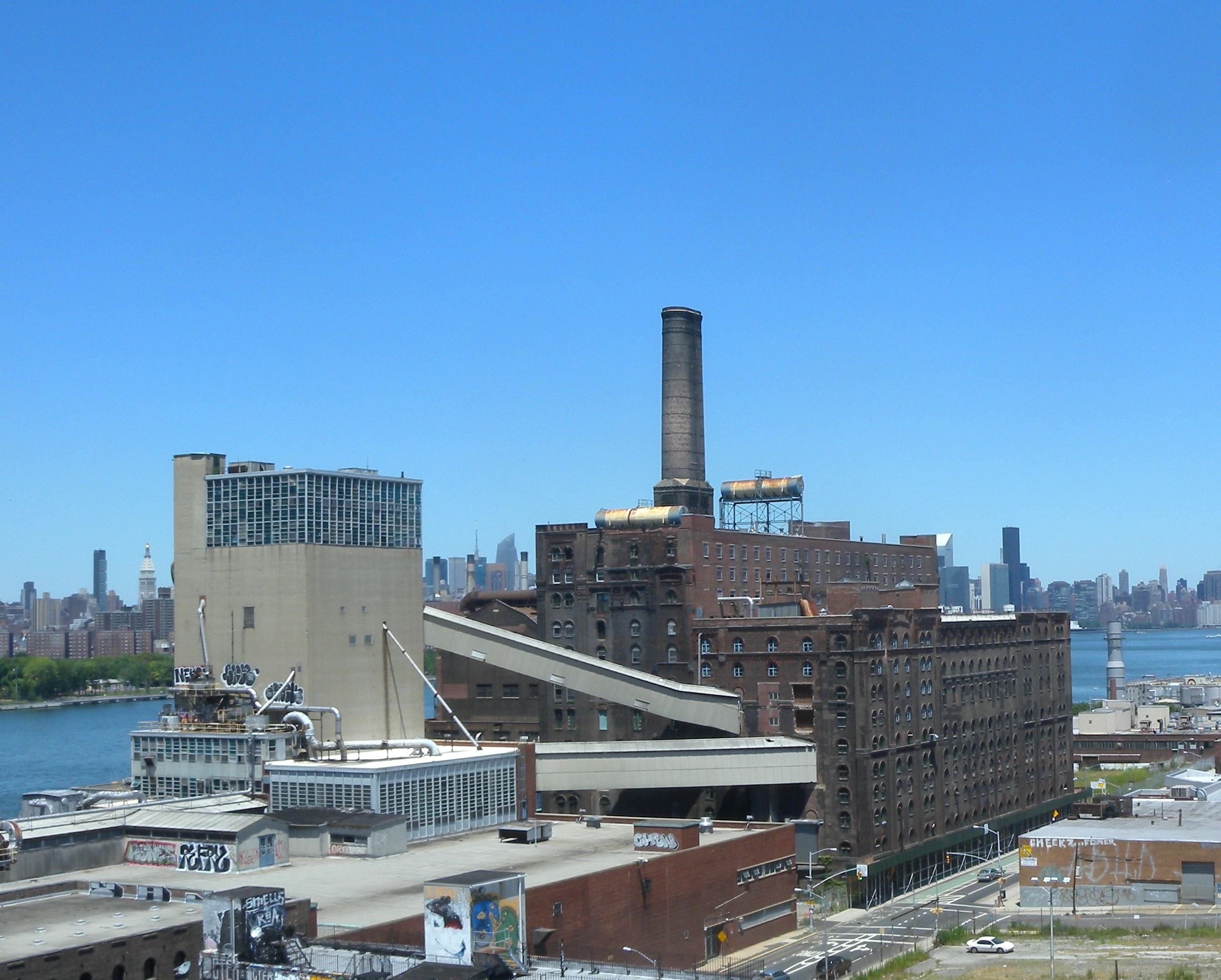
As seen from the Williamsburg Bridge to the south

As early as the 1920s, industry-wide changes were resulting in a reduction of utilization of the Brooklyn plant. After American Sugar completed a plant in Baltimore in 1922, refining operations in Brooklyn were reduced. The company also assumed space at 120 Wall Street in Manhattan's Financial District in 1930, using that space for its offices. The refinery's cooperage closed in 1946 after the industry stopped using wood barrels to ship sugar. Employment at the plant fell after the end of World War II in 1945; the company had 1,500 workers in 1959. Research and development activities were relocated in 1958 to American Sugar's Philadelphia facility. Despite this, the company spent $16 million on expanding the facility in the 1960s. American Sugar was renamed Amstar in 1970, and its New York City office was relocated to 1251 Avenue of the Americas in 1971. By the late 1970s, the Amstar refinery was the only remaining sugar refinery on the Williamsburg waterfront.

The Amstar brand was purchased by British firm Tate & Lyle in 1988. Three years later, Amstar became known as Domino Sugar, after its primary trademark. Employment at the Domino Sugar Refinery continued to decrease, and by 1996 the plant had only 450 workers. After union workers' contracts expired in late 1998, Tate & Lyle announced upgrades to the refinery that would eliminate 100 jobs and weaken union guarantees. As a result, 284 workers went on strike in June 1999. When the strike started, Domino reduced operations at the refinery, performing much of the refining at its Baltimore plant before shipping it to Brooklyn for finishing. The strike ended in February 2001, making it one of the longest-ever in the city's history. Although over a hundred workers defected and returned to work, the remaining striking workers agreed to Tate & Lyle's plan to eliminate 110 positions. American Sugar Refining bought the brand and plant from Tate & Lyle the same year.

Though the complex was able to process 950 million U.S. gallons (3.6×10^{9} L; 790,000,000 imp gal) of sugar a year, it was only processing half that amount by 2002. The next year, American Sugar Refining announced that the Domino Sugar plant would be shuttered due to a lack of demand. The refinery stopped operating in 2004. More than 220 workers were laid off at the end of January 2004, and two dozen workers were retained for packing operations that shuttered by the end of the year.

== Redevelopment plans ==
=== CPC proposal ===
The 11-acre (4.5 ha) site was purchased by CPC Resources, the for-profit arm of the Community Preservation Corporation, and Brooklyn developer Isaac Katan in July 2004 for $55.8 million. Following a wide-ranging rezoning of the north Brooklyn waterfront the next year, preservationists lobbied to save the Domino Sugar Refinery and other industrial structures on the waterfront. The Landmarks Preservation Commission (LPC) designated the Pan, Filter, and Finishing House as an official city landmark in 2007. Though the yellow "Domino Sugar" sign facing the East River was not part of the designation, the developer proposed keeping the sign by displaying it on top of the Pan, Filter, and Finishing House.

CPC's original plan for the site, designed by Rafael Viñoly, included up to nine buildings, four of which would be over 300 feet (91 m) tall. The plan called for 2,200 apartments, 660 of which would be set aside or designated as affordable housing, as well as a school; the "Domino Sugar" sign on the refinery would be preserved. The CPC plan received support from the New York City Council in 2010. However, it faced opposition from local residents, who objected to the scale of the proposed development. In 2012, CPC defaulted on its development project for the Domino Sugar Factory. Development company Two Trees Management expressed interest for the site that June and purchased it for $185 million that October.

=== SHoP proposal ===
Two Trees submitted a new design plan for the site in 2013, designed by SHoP Architects. The new plan called for 60% more public open space on a new street grid, allowed mixed-use zoning, and was designed to connect the existing neighborhood to the new 0.25 mi (400 m) waterfront. Two Trees' plan would still set aside 660 out of the 2,200 apartments for affordable housing, but it would also include buildings of up to 50 stories, which would be some of Brooklyn's tallest buildings. Though some neighborhood residents opposed the redevelopment, this opposition was more limited after Two Trees agreed to add more affordable housing and parkland. One of the proposed buildings was replaced within a plaza. The revised plan faced objection from New York City mayor Bill de Blasio, who wanted even more affordable housing on the site. In response, David Walentas indicated that he was willing to revert to the older plan.

In March 2014, the City Planning Commission approved a revised $1.5 billion redevelopment plan for the Domino site, after Two Trees Management agreed to include more affordable housing units. That deal required Two Trees to include 700 below-market-rate units, which was 40 more than what was originally offered and 260 more than what the CPC wanted. In exchange, Two Trees was allowed to build its towers of up to 55 stories. Three floors would be built on top of the existing factory building.

=== Redevelopment progress ===
==== 2010s ====
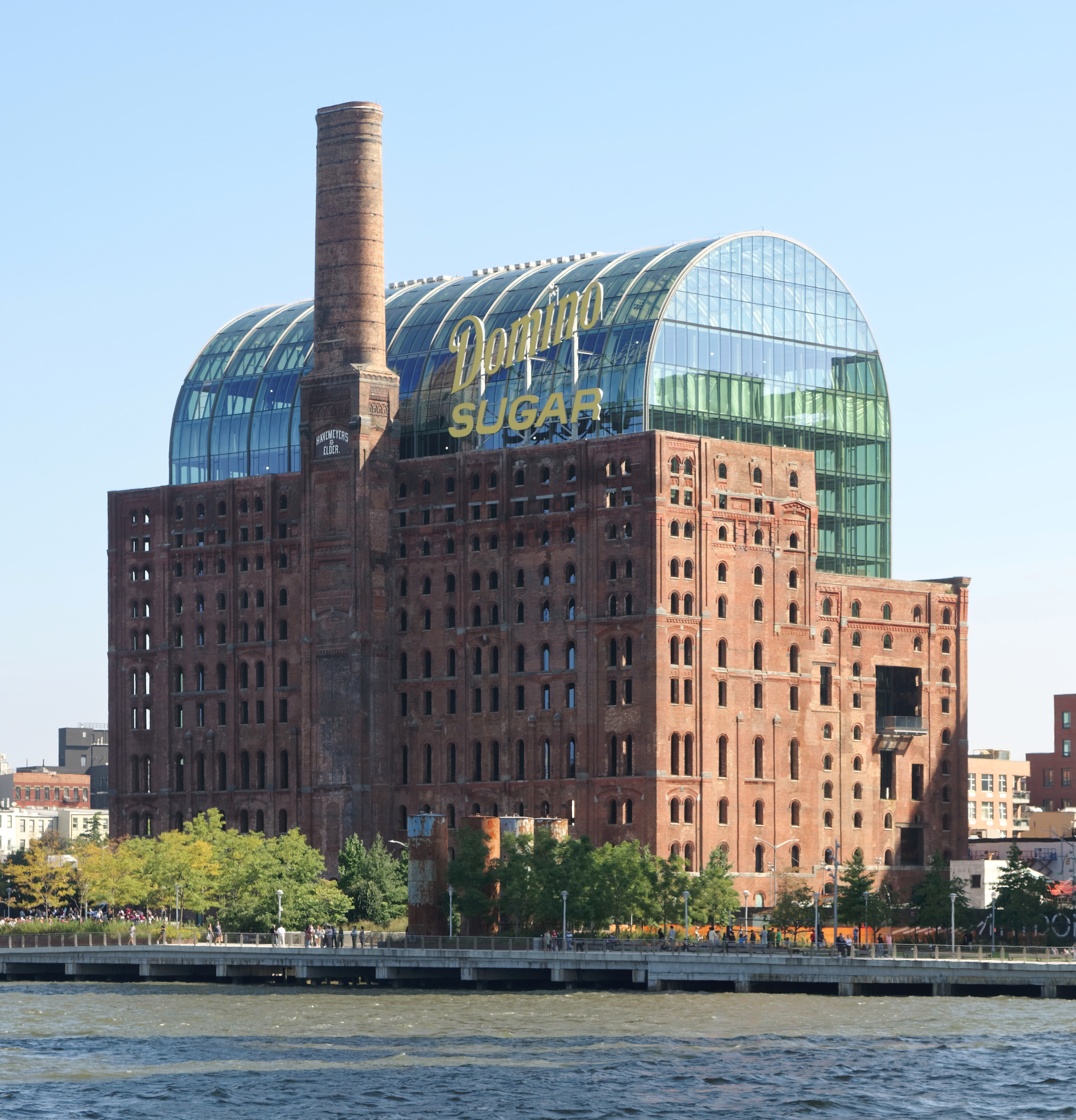
The renovated Refinery building in 2023

In 2014, photographer David Allee explored the abandoned portions of the refinery, stating that it smelled of "creme brulee mixed with mold and rot". The same year, from May through July, artist Kara Walker exhibited her piece A Subtlety at the refinery's Syrup Shed. After the closure of the exhibition, the non-landmarked portions of the refinery were to be demolished, as had been planned before the show. In mid-2014, demolition of the structures commenced; demolition was mostly complete by December 2014. Excavation for the first building in the complex, 325 Kent Avenue, started in May 2015. Two Trees also cleaned out the Pan, Filter, and Finishing House, which still contained its old sugar-refining machinery. In February 2017, the developers of the redevelopment project opened a housing lottery for the 104 affordable-housing apartments at 325 Kent Avenue, which attracted 87,000 applicants, or about 837 for every apartment. 325 Kent Avenue opened in July 2017, and the first residents moved into the building the next month.

A second residential building, 260 Kent Avenue, started construction in early 2018. The LPC approved a redesign for the landmarked portion of the refinery complex in November 2017. Domino Park, a public park along the East River waterfront, opened in June 2018. A modification to the landmarked Pan, Filter, and Finishing House was approved in August 2019. The interconnected towers at One South First and Ten Grand opened shortly afterward. One South First opened in September 2019, followed by Ten Grand that November. The first office tenant at Ten Grand signed a lease in December 2019.

==== 2020s ====
No other office tenants had signed leases at Ten Grand before the onset of the COVID-19 pandemic in New York City in early 2020, which caused demand for physical office space to decline significantly. During the pandemic, Two Trees leased space at Ten Grand to numerous local companies. According to a 2022 analysis by Curbed, "85 percent of the founders and principals" of the companies at Ten Grand lived in either Williamsburg or the adjacent neighborhoods of Greenpoint and Bushwick. By early 2021, the Pan, Filter, and Finishing House, which had been renamed the Refinery, was being renovated. Two Trees opened an affordable-housing lottery for One South First's 89 affordable units in early 2022. That August, M&T Bank gave Two Trees an $80 million construction loan to fund the completion of the development. Around the same time, Two Trees began leasing out 460,000 square feet (43,000 m^{2}) of office space in the Refinery building.

Work on 346 Kent Avenue (later known as One Domino Square), a pair of towers at the southern end of the development, began in November 2022. To finance the construction of 346 Kent Avenue, Two Trees received a $365 million loan from JPMorgan Chase at the end of that year. In addition, the Refinery building's barrel-vaulted roof was being completed by late 2022, and an LED replica of the old "Domino Sugar" sign was installed on the building that December. The Refinery building reopened September 27, 2023. Two Trees offered tax breaks to companies that relocated from Manhattan to the Refinery building.

Sales at One Domino Square began in April 2024, and the building formally opened in June of that year. The Domino Square plaza opened at the Domino Sugar Refinery site in September 2024, and a housing lottery for One Domino Square's rental apartments was opened the next month. Between 15 and 20 percent of One Domino Square's condos had been sold by late 2024, but only 25% of the Refinery building's space had been leased out. Because of the lack of major tenants at the Refinery, that building's interior space was subdivided and marketed to smaller tenants. By mid-2025, nearly half of One Domino Square's condos had been sold. In late 2026, Ben Lovett's firm TVG Hospitality and Emerson Hospitality were jointly hired to operate the Domino music venue in the Refinery building, which was scheduled to open in April 2027.

== Buildings ==
The Domino Sugar Refinery site spans 11 acres (4.5 ha) on the East River north of the Williamsburg Bridge. When the redevelopment is complete, it will include 200,000 square feet (19,000 m^{2}) of community and commercial space; 600,000 square feet (56,000 m^{2}) of office space; 2,800 apartments, of which 700 will be affordable; and 6 acres (2.4 ha) of parkland on the waterfront, which is part of Domino Park. The entire complex will eventually contain five residential buildings and cost $3 billion.

=== Residential and commercial towers ===
==== 325 Kent Avenue ====
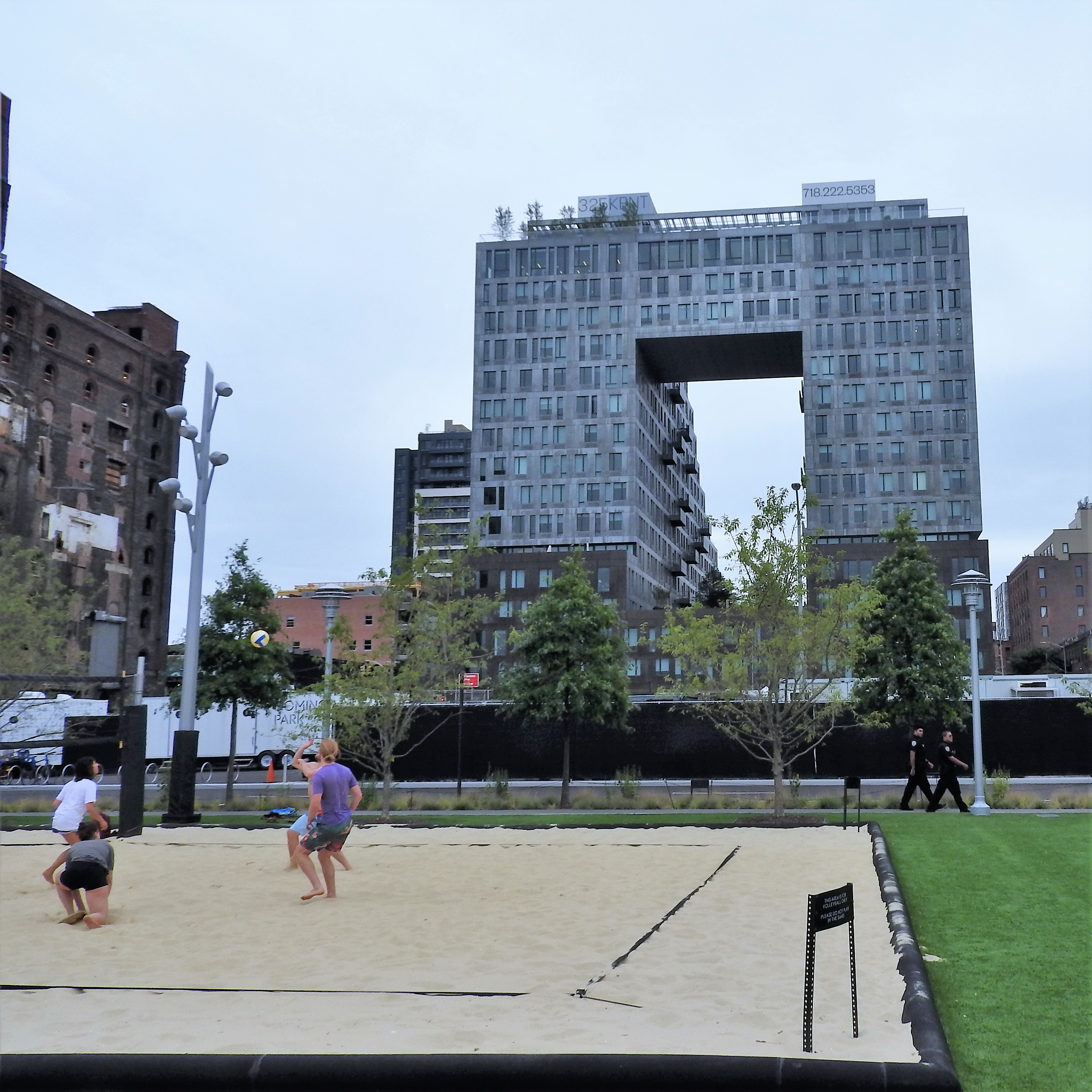
Domino Park, looking east toward 325 Kent Avenue

325 Kent Avenue, a 16-story, 170-foot (52 m) tower designed by SHoP Architects, is located on the east side of Kent Avenue. The building contains 522 residential units, 105 of which are affordable-housing apartments, and the units range from studio apartments to two-bedroom apartments. 325 Kent Avenue has 382,750 square feet (35,559 m^{2}) of residential space and 9,370 square feet (871 m^{2}) of ground-floor retail space. The building contains amenities such as a rooftop deck, a fitness center, a residents' lounge, and a courtyard on the fourth floor.

The lower portion of the facade is made of copper, while the upper portion consists of zinc. The massing of the structure consists of two stepped towers on the north and south, which step down gradually from west to east. The tops of the two wings are connected on the western side of the building, creating a rectangular hole on the western facade and giving it a "doughnut" shape.

==== One South First and Ten Grand ====
The 45-story One South First tower (also known as 260 Kent Avenue) and the 24-story Ten Grand tower are located between South 1st and South 2nd streets, north of the Pan, Filter, and Finishing House on the western side of Kent Avenue. The structures were designed by Cookfox. One South First contains 330 residential units, 66 of which are affordable-housing apartments; the units range from studios to two-bedroom apartments. Ten Grand contains 15,000 square feet (1,400 m^{2}) of retail space and 150,000 square feet (14,000 m^{2}) of office space. The combined structure's amenities include a rooftop deck with cabanas, a fitness center, a residents' lounge, a swimming pool, and spaces for coworking.

The buildings comprise a single structure; the massing is designed so that the upper stories of One South First are carried over the top of Ten Grand upon a glass-clad structure. The facade is made of precast concrete, which the architects stated is based on sugar crystals' molecular structure. The panels for One South First generally measure 9.75 by 5.75 feet (2.97 by 1.75 m), while the panels for Ten Grand and the shared base measure 12.42 by 10.00 feet (3.79 by 3.05 m).

==== One Domino Square ====
One Domino Square, at 5 South Fifth Street, is composed of two towers rising from a shared base. It was designed by Annabelle Selldorf and includes 160 condominiums and about 400 rental apartments. (Note: Some sources give a figure of 398 or 399 rental apartments, while others cite the building as having exactly 400 rental apartments.) About 120 of the rental apartments are affordable housing units and are reserved for low-income residents. The condo tower is 39 stories tall and is the Domino Sugar Refinery complex's only condo tower, while the rental tower is 55 stories tall. The facade of both towers is made of iridescent porcelain tiles.

The two towers combined have over 700,000 square feet (65,000 m^{2}) of space. The podium includes retail on the ground story. There are 45,000 square feet (4,200 m^{2}) of amenity space on five additional floors, including terraces, a fitness center, coworking space, and a spa. An elliptical staircase connects three of the amenity floors. The condos range from one to three bedrooms and contain features such as movable windows, rooms with high ceilings, and smart devices in the kitchens and bathrooms.

=== Parks ===
Domino Park runs along the East River waterfront, west of Kent Avenue. Designed by the architectural firm of James Corner, the public park includes pieces of machinery from the factory, as well as gardens, a play area for children, and various fields. An elevated walkway runs along the length of the park. River Street runs parallel to the park for the entire length of the development.

Just south of the refinery building, and next to Domino Park, is Domino Square, a 1-acre (0.40 ha) public plaza. It was designed by Field Operations and Studio Cadena, with Lisa Switkin as the landscape architect. Domino Square is shaped like an oval bowl, which, at its widest point, measures 100 feet (30 m) across. There are 120 plantings, as well as several levels of seating. The plantings include pines, oaks, redbud trees, and flowers within steel planters; Switkin said these plantings were meant to allude to a forest in the northeastern United States. The plaza itself is paved in asphalt, and there is a reclaimed water system underneath the plaza, which treats recycled water from the complex's buildings. The interior of the bowl can be used as a theater in the round, an event space, or a wintertime ice rink. Around the plaza are retail spaces.

=== Refinery ===
When the refinery was rebuilt in 1882–1883, it was composed of several structures on the west side of Kent Avenue between South 2nd and South 6th streets. It was described upon its completion as being the largest sugar refinery in the Americas. The Pan, Filter, and Finishing House is located between South 2nd and South 3rd streets. Immediately adjacent, between South 3rd and South 4th streets, was a 6-story storehouse and a machine shop. The block between South 4th and South 5th streets was a 7-story refinery building, while the block to the south was a single-story detached storehouse. Only the Pan, Filter, and Finishing House remains of the refinery complex.

==== Pan, Filter, and Finishing House ====
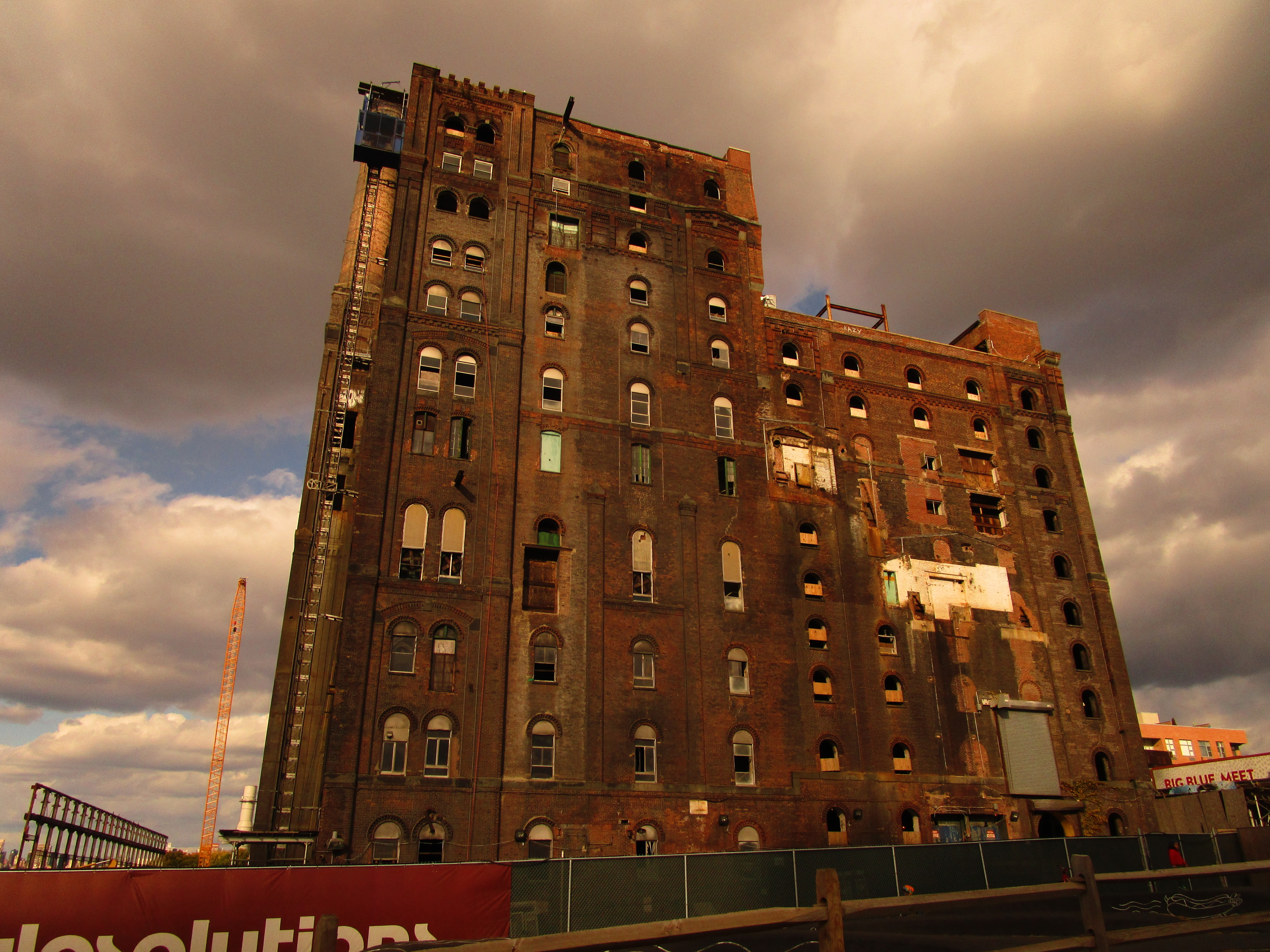
Pan, Filter, and Finishing House, seen from the south

The extant structure of the refinery consists of the Pan, Filter, and Finishing House (also known as the Refinery building), a New York City designated landmark designed by Theodore Havemeyer, Thomas Winslow, and J. E. James. The building is at 292 Kent Avenue between South 2nd and South 3rd streets.

===== Form and facade =====
The 10-story pan house and Finishing House sections are 130 feet (40 m) tall, while the 13-story filter house section is 155 feet (47 m) tall, including a chimney. These structures are interconnected and measured 250 feet (76 m) north–south by 150 feet (46 m) west–east. The Pan, Filter, and Finishing House was one of the tallest buildings in Brooklyn when finished, rivaling the heights of early skyscrapers in Lower Manhattan's Financial District.

The Pan, Filter, and Finishing House is made mostly of reddish brick, which are 4 feet (1.2 m) thick on the lower stories and 2 feet (0.61 m) thick on the upper stories. The massing has no setbacks, though the facade has decorative elements on the upper stories. On the eastern facade, along Kent Avenue, there are vertical brick pilasters. On the western facade, facing the East River, the facade contains bricks that are recessed to form patterns such as chevrons and polygons. In some places, bluestone was used in belt courses and keystones. Most of the windows have brick arches. The building was fueled by coal, which required a 155-foot (47 m) chimney to ventilate safely. The chimney was among the region's tallest when the Pan, Filter, and Finishing House was built. (Note: The tallest was the 210-foot (64 m) chimney of the New York Steam Company.) The top section of the chimney was expanded in the 1920s using curved brick. To deliver coal to the refinery, American Sugar used ten coal barges, each with a capacity of between 750 and 1,250 short tons (670 and 1,120 long tons; 680 and 1,130 t).

Vishaan Chakrabarti of Practice for Architecture and Urbanism designed a conversion of the building in 2017. The plans include adding a new glass facade with a barrel vault behind the existing, landmarked walls of the Pan, Filter, and Finishing House. The glass roof was originally proposed to be 224 feet (68 m) high, but plans for the structure were modified in 2019, calling for a glass roof 235 feet (72 m) tall. The new structure rises 15 stories to the barrel vault, and a penthouse measuring 30 feet (9.1 m) tall is placed immediately below the vault. The shape of the roof was inspired by the arched window openings that are placed throughout the original facade. A reviewer for the Financial Times wrote in 2023 that the Refinery building was "an object from another age, a time when Brooklyn was a place of production rather than consumption".

===== Interior =====
The interior was outfitted with brick floors atop brick flat-topped arches, which were supported by iron beams and 66 cast-iron columns. Fire escapes, fire extinguishers, and electric lights were also present in the Pan, Filter, and Finishing House. The interior of the building was converted to 460,000 square feet (43,000 m^{2}) of office space in the 2020s. As part of the interior renovation, the ceiling heights of floors 1–4, 14, and 15 were increased, while floor 16 was eliminated.

The ground floor is used for retail and also contains restrooms for Domino Park visitors. The building also has a 40,000-square-foot (3,700 m^{2}) fitness club with a gym and swimming pool. There is also a 750-seat music venue within the building, called the Domino. which is located next to the gym. Floors 2–13 are used as office space, and floor 14 has a double-height event space with a catering kitchen and service areas. Each story covers 30,000 square feet (2,800 m^{2}). Above the first story, the glass office structure is recessed 10 feet (3.0 m) from the landmarked facade, and each story is 12 to 14 feet (3.7 to 4.3 m) high. The structure's staircases are between the landmarked facade and the glass structure. A wall garden is also placed between the new office structure and the landmarked facade. There is no usable space between the old and new facades, except at ground level where the window sills of the new facade reach the floor.

==== Former buildings ====
The former buildings at the refinery include the Syrup Shed, the Wash House, the Turbine Room, the Power House, and the Pump House. Several gantry cranes were situated on the waterfront, unloading sugar. The cranes ran on tracks that were 425 feet (130 m) long.

The complex also contained a "bin structure" in which sugar grains were categorized by size, as well as conveyor bridges leading down to the refinery building. A yellow "Domino Sugar" sign, dating from the 1920s, was hung on one of the buildings facing the waterfront. In December 2022, a replica of the old sign was installed on the Pan, Filter, and Finishing House. In contrast to the original neon sign, the replica contains 9-foot-7-inch-tall (2.92 m) letters illuminated by LEDs.

A two-story boiler house was located along the East River, west of the refinery building. A 505-foot-long (154 m) warehouse was located adjacent to the boiler house. Five large pumps drew in 20 million US gallons (76,000,000 L; 17,000,000 imp gal) of saltwater from the East River, which was used for the condensers and then pumped back out. The refinery also used large amounts of fresh water: in 1903, it was estimated that the refinery alone used two percent of Brooklyn's water supply.

== See also ==
- History of sugar
- List of New York City Designated Landmarks in Brooklyn
