= Sam Flores =

American painter

Sam Flores is an American visual artist, illustrator, and muralist, primarily creating urban- and graffiti-inspired modern art.

== Biography ==
Sam Flores was born in the state of New Mexico in the United States. As a young man, he moved to San Francisco, California. When he was younger, he was recorded to be inspired by the work of graffiti, which is what currently drives his inspirations for his paintings and works. He grew up in the scene of skating, graffiti, comic books, and hip hop music and this is reflected in his work. As of 2013, he is currently a part of the Upper Playground, a San Francisco Bay Area brand collective of artists where he has a sub-brand called 12Grain.

=== Works ===
He has worked with various mediums, including acrylics, pen and ink, and sculpture. Much of his early work focused on developing designs for skateboarding and clothing companies. He has displayed in the United States, Canada, Singapore, Japan and throughout Europe.

Sam Flores is known for his work having an art nouveau style, intense color combinations, and fine detail. His work is usually presented on canvas or wood. He is a self-taught artist. He combines unique and disproportional creatures with vibrant landscapes. His greatest influences are Michel Parkes and Maurice Sendak. He had participated in doing some work for the Hope Gallery at the Democratic National Convention in the year of 2009.

>
