= Domino Park =

Public park in Brooklyn, New York

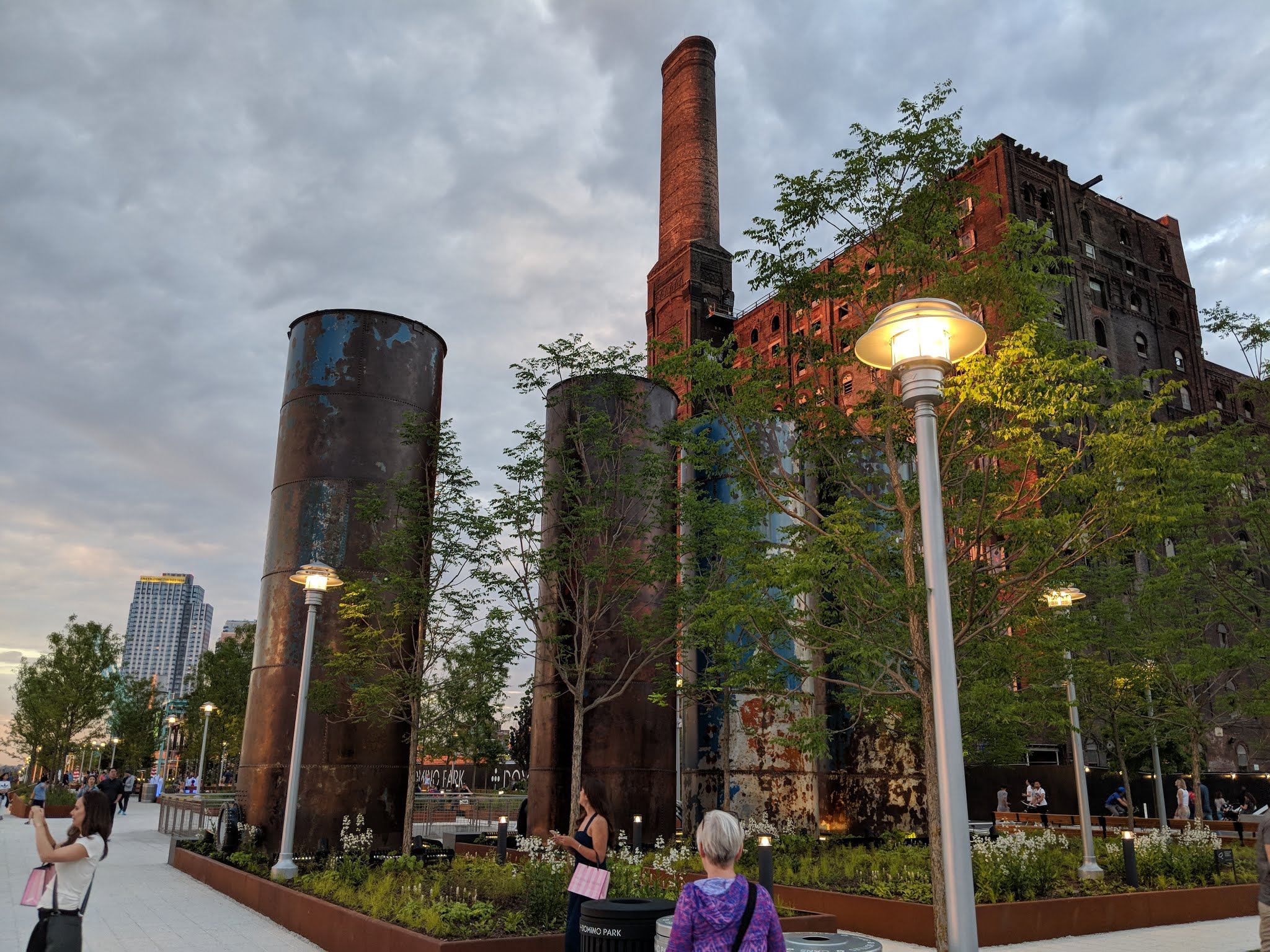
- A view within the park of the Domino Sugar Refinery and the reclaimed syrup collection tanks
- Interactive map of Domino Park
- Type: Private-public
- Location: Williamsburg, Brooklyn, New York City
- Coordinates: 40°42′54″N 73°58′4″W
- Area: 5 acres (2.0 ha)
- Opened: June 10, 2018
- Designer: James Corner Field Operations
- Operator: Two Trees Management

Domino Park is a 5-acre (2.0 ha) public park in the Williamsburg neighborhood of Brooklyn, New York City. It spans a quarter mile along the East River near the Williamsburg Bridge, at the Domino Sugar Refinery site. Along the five-block riverside walk, various salvaged factory equipment is displayed, including four syrup collection tanks, that pay tribute to the history of the Domino Sugar Refinery.

James Corner Field Operations, which also designed the High Line, took six years to design Domino Park. Opened to the public in 2018, it is owned and operated by Two Trees Management, which spent roughly $50 million to construct it.

== Attractions ==
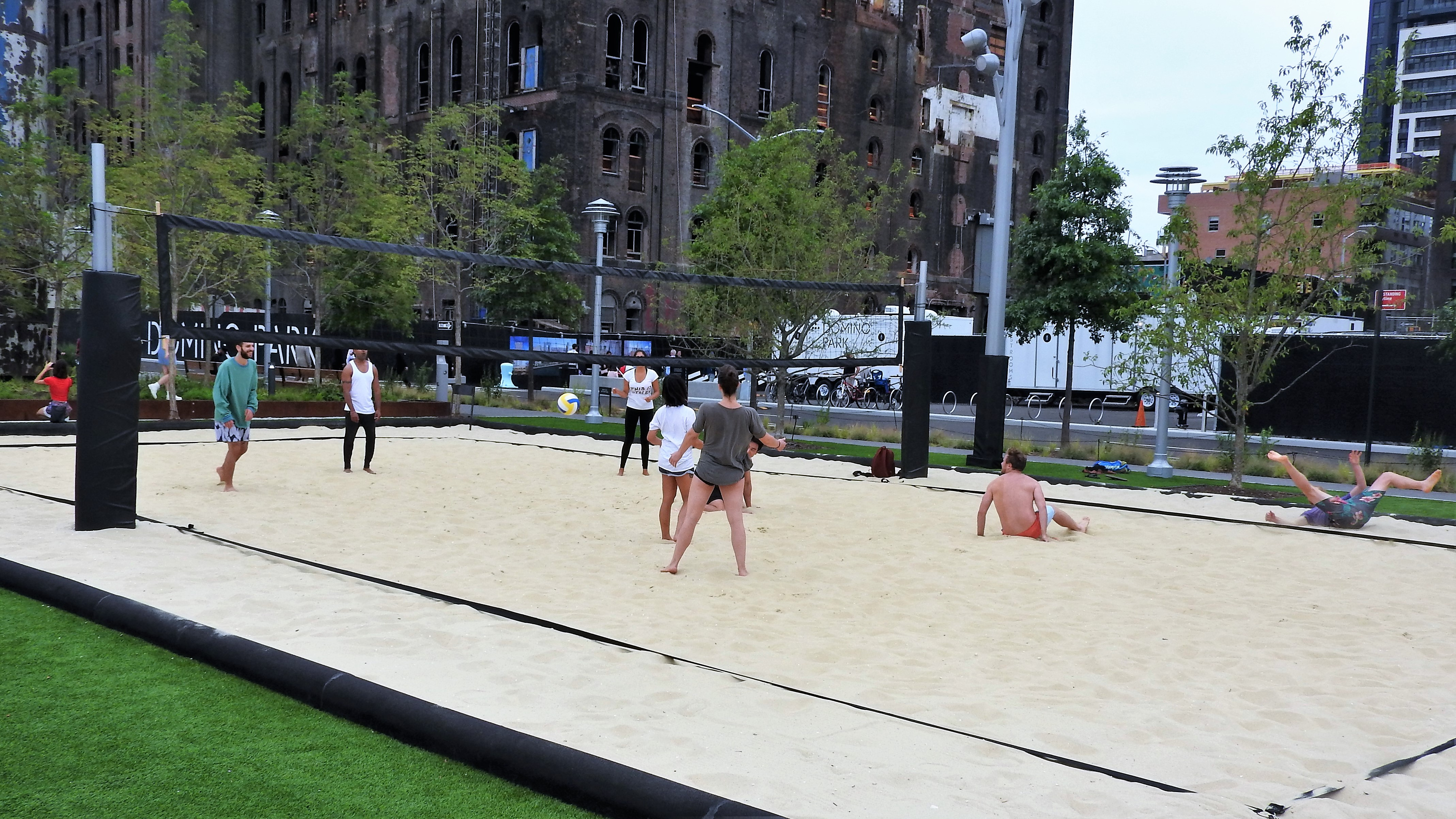
Volleyball

The park features a children's playground, dog run, volleyball court, bocce court, and a playing field. The volleyball court is partially meant to pay homage to the historical Latino population of Williamsburg, with whom the sport is popular. In a move to shift the burden of upkeep to the private sector, a small restaurant was also planned for the park.

An elevated walkway extends much of the length of the park, resembling the interior of the old refinery. The crane tracks that were used in the original refinery now houses gardens with roughly a hundred different species of plants. All wooden structures and chairs in the park were built using reclaimed wood from the refinery. At the southern end of the park are water jets making an illuminated dancing fountain display, shooting eight feet (2.4 m) into the air.

The playground was designed by artist Mark Reigelman. Named Sweetwater Playground, it is designed to resemble the sugar refining process. Reigelman wrote, "The idea is that a child enters as raw sugar cane and exits at the last portion of the playground as molasses, or sugar cubes." It is also partially built using reclaimed materials from the old refinery.

Hurricane Sandy struck New York while the park was under construction in 2012. To safeguard against future storms, the park is located on an elevation well above the Federal Emergency Management Agency's flood elevation guidelines.

== History ==
The park opened on June 10, 2018.

As of 2020, the park had seen over 2 million visitors. The park was one of eight spaces nominated for that year's Urban Space Award hosted by the Urban Land Institute. In 2020, during the COVID-19 pandemic in New York City, Domino Park expanded a composting program after the city's own composting initiative was downsized due to the pandemic. Social distancing circles were drawn on the park's green to encourage people to stay at least 6 feet (1.8 m) from each other.
