= Audio post production =

Process of sound production synchronizing with moving picture

Audio post-production is all stages of audio production relating to sound produced and synchronized with moving picture (film, television, or video). It involves sound design, sound effects, Foley, ADR, sound editing, audio mixing, mastering, etc.

== Film ==
In filmmaking, audio post-production is the creation and manipulation of audio that is synchronized with a moving picture. This includes, but is often distinguished from production audio, which is the audio recorded as filming occurs. Most other aspects of audio for moving pictures occur during the post-production phase, everything is done after filming. This also may include sound design or the creation of sound effects, which can occur during pre-production, production, or post-production. This applies to television, cinema and commercials. One major aspect of audio post-production is the use of automatic dialogue replacement (ADR).

Sometimes the original production audio lacks in performance or quality, and one or more actors work in a sound studio to record some or all of their dialogue from the project. Other elements such as Foley, music and voiceover are also added during post-production.

== Music ==
In music, audio post-production includes processes such as mixing and mastering. The audio engineering community more commonly refers to these processes as music production.

== Vocal media ==
Reworking and enhancing voice-based media is prevalent in the form of noise reduction and volume normalization. With the emergence of podcasts, audio post-production with a focus on vocals has become more common. Sound recording devices with different characteristics and capabilities such as dynamic range have led to increased demand for consistent sound. With many techniques being adjusted specifically for vocal audio, the field is becoming more understood as unique to music production.

== Notable Companies in Audio Post Production ==
- DFAD
- Formosa Group
- Skywalker Sound
- Pinewood Studios
- Keywords Studios Plc
