= Source-Connect =

Remote audio recording software

- Developer: Source Elements
- Initial release: 2005
- Operating system: Windows, MacOS
- Available in: English
- Type: Remote audio recording software
- License: Software as a service
- Website: source-elements.com/products/source-connect

Source-Connect is a software application for MacOS and Windows developed by Source Elements. It is designed to allow remote audio recording with real-time synchronization through a high-speed internet connection. The company is based in Chicago.

== History ==
Source-Connect had its initial launch in 2005. It was designed as an alternative to ISDN. Source-Connect was developed by Source Elements, a software company founded by Rebekah Wilson, Robert Marshall, and John Binder.

Source Elements announced Source-Connect 3.0 in 2007.

In February 2013, Source Elements announced support for the Hamachi VPN for the 3.7.2 version of Source-Connect. Later that year, Source Elements also announced the release of Source-Connect Standard and Pro 3.7 for Windows.

In 2014, a BBC story covered how British audio engineer, producer, and musician Alan Parsons used Source-Connect to aid London-based independent rock band Electric Litany with recording their second album.

The following year, Source Elements released Source-Connect 3.8 for MacOS.

In 2016, Source-Connect 3.9 was released.

For the upcoming Source-Connect 4, Source Elements received the 2024 NAB Show Product of the Year Award in the Remote Production category.

For the company’s work with Source-Connect, Source Elements was a finalist at the World Changing Ideas Awards in 2021. In 2023, co-founder Rebekah Wilson was also nominated for the Business Leader Award at the Rise Awards.

== Software ==
Source-Connect allows real-time transmission of high-quality audio between two locations through a high-speed Internet connection.It utilizes sample-accurate synchronization to keep projects in sync across continents. The synchronization feature can be used on any DAW which can run the Re-Wire plugin. Source-Connect RTS (Remote Transport Sync) syncs multiple DAW sessions across the Internet. It also allows surround sound monitoring. There are no call charges for using Source-Connect.

Source-Connect has an Auto-Restore and Replace feature, which automatically transfers locally-stored source recordings, replaces streaming audio recorded during live remote sessions with full-quality source recordings, and corrects errors in files recorded in the DAW.

Source-Connect also has a companion software called Source-Nexus Suite, which allows remote HD video and audio collaboration in real time, giving users the opportunity to supervise voiceover recordings and audio mix sessions.

Source-Connect has been used by studios such as Abbey Road Studios, Red Facilities,and Crash Symphony Productions, which used it for ADR on films and television productions such as Turn: Washington’s Spies.
