= James Corner =

Landscape architect

James Corner (born 1961) is a landscape architect and theorist whose works exhibit a focus on "developing innovative approaches toward landscape architectural design and urbanism." His designs of note include Fresh Kills Park on Staten Island and the High Line in Manhattan, and Domino Park in Brooklyn, all in New York City.

Corner is a professionally registered landscape architect and the principal of James Corner Field Operations, a landscape architecture and urban design practice based in New York City.

== Life and career ==
Born in 1961 in United Kingdom, Corner received a Bachelor's degree with first class honors in 1983 at Manchester Metropolitan University in England. He then received a Master's Degree in Landscape Architecture and Urban Design Certificate from the University of Pennsylvania in 1986. He was employed by Wallace, Roberts and Todd on the New Jersey Hudson River Waterfront Development; for Richard Rogers and Partners on the redevelopment of the Royal Docks in London; and for William Gillespie and Partners on the design and implementation of the International Garden Festival Park in Liverpool.

Corner began teaching at the University of Pennsylvania in 1988 where he taught courses in media and theory, as well as design studios. He was elected Chair of the Landscape Architecture Department the 2000. As a professor, Corner's landscape design and environmental research and teaching interests are based upon "developing innovative approaches toward landscape architectural design and urbanism." He has also served as a visiting professor at the Royal Danish Academy of Fine Arts in Copenhagen, Denmark in 1998 and at the KTH School of Architecture in Stockholm, Sweden in 1999.

Corner's practice, Field Operations, was initially formed in collaboration with architect Stan Allen, but the partners chose to focus on their individual practices in 2005. The firm is at the forefront of the landscape urbanism movement, an interdisciplinary approach that, in theory, amalgamates a wide range of disciplines including landscape architecture, urban design, landscape ecology, and engineering, among other subjects. Corner argues that it is an approach that focuses on process rather than a style and that it marks a productive attitude toward indeterminacy, open-endedness, inter-mixing, and cross-disciplinarity.

== Works ==
Corner's designs bring back the open spaces of the natural wild with a rough, natural, and ecologically sound approach; this could be compared to the works of Frederick Law Olmsted, except more unbridled.

- The High Line is a 1.5-mile-long stretch (2.4 km) of abandoned railroad viaduct that runs from the Meatpacking district to Hell's Kitchen. The proposed design by Field Operations is meant to transform it into a 1.5-mile-long park (2.4 km). Corner envisioned "fantastic, mixed perennial landscape" interspersed by "event spaces." Since its completion, it has made an impact on the surrounding blocks with the addition of 27 new residential towers, hotels, offices, and museums. The High Line is widely cited as a prominent example of adaptive reuse, transforming a disused elevated freight rail line into a vibrant public park and urban greenway.
- Corner's Field Operations headed up a team that won the international design competition with its "Lifescape" design for the redesign of Freshkills Park, a project intended to salvage a massive landfill on Staten Island. The landfill is the largest in the country at 2,200 acres (8.9 km^{2}), or three times the size of Central Park in Manhattan. The winning design incorporates a World Trade Center memorial, because the landfill was temporarily reopened to accommodate the remains of the towers, as well as a strong, central focus on programs, habitat, and circulation throughout the new park. Fresh Kills Park is reminiscent of Olmsted's massive design for Central Park as far as work load, scale, and project purpose and design. Fresh Kills Park is said to be "one of the most ambitious public works projects in the world," considering 45% of the area is landfill and the remaining land is wetlands and lowlands. The goal of Fresh Kills Park is to create a world class large-scale park which restores the ecological systems, yet allows New York to optimize its local and regional access while reducing traffic congestion. The park will be developed as a setting for a range of outdoor activities, programs, and recreation that are unique to New York.
- Cornell NYC Tech campus - Landscape design for the new high tech college campus on the site of the Coler-Goldwater Specialty Hospital on Roosevelt Island
- The Underline, a similar concept to the High Line, a linear park that would run for 10 miles (16 km) from Brickell to Dadeland in Miami, Florida.
- Cleveland Public Square is a 10-acre civic space (4.0 ha) in downtown Cleveland originally conceived in 1796. Corner's renovation united the four previously divided quadrants into one, incorporating green space, a splash fountain, and the non-GMO, Warhol-inspired REBoL restaurant, while still prominently including the classic Soldiers' and Sailors' monument.
- Newark Riverfront Park (phase 4), in Downtown Newark, New Jersey
- Tunnel Tops, a 14-acre park (5.7 ha) to be built on top of a set of two tunnels that carry Doyle Drive (U.S. Highway 101) through San Francisco's Crissy Field. It is designed to reconnect the Main Post of the Presidio to Crissy Field and the waterfront; these areas had long been separated by Doyle Drive, which formerly ran on an elevated viaduct before its demolition and reconstruction (2009-2015).
- Tongva Park is a 6.2-acre (2.5 ha) park in Santa Monica, California named after the indigenous Tongva people, who have lived in the Los Angeles area for thousands of years.
- West Harbor is a 42 acres (17 ha) food hall and waterfront park in San Pedro, Los Angeles, California.

== Books ==
A new aspect of Corner's approach, one that was responsible for his receiving the Chrysler Design Institute Award in 2000, is his plan of working with graphic artists, photographers, and other artists from various fields. An example of this is the project Corner and photographer Alex MacLean completed when they published their Taking Measures Across the American Landscape which is a journey to explore the types of landscapes in the United States through essays and map drawings by Corner and aerial photos taken by McLean.

- (with Alex McLean) Taking Measures Across the American Landscape (Yale, 1996) ISBN 0-300-06566-3 Received the AIA International Book of the Year Award and the ASLA Award of Honor.
- Recovering Landscape: Essays in Contemporary Landscape Architecture (Princeton Architectural Press, 1999) ISBN 1-56898-179-1, a book focused on the revitalization of landscape architecture as a critical cultural practice, it offers insight on how contemporary landscapes are "designed, constructed and culturally valued".
- (editor with Lynn Margulis and Brian Hawthorne) Ian McHarg: conversations with students: dwelling in nature (Princeton Architectural Press, 2006) ISBN 978-1-56898-620-3
- (with Michael Spens and Peter Latz) Landscapes Transformed (Academy Editions, 1996), 112 pages. ISBN 1-85490-452-3. This book examines the condition of the modern landscape. It presents an international collection of projects which challenge old perceptions and give good cause for confidence in the future of landscape design.
- The Landscape Imagination: The Collected Essays of James Corner 1990—2010 (Princeton Architectural Press, 2014).

== Awards and honors ==
Corner was the first landscape architect to receive many of the awards that he has won. In 1996, Corner received the G. Holmes Perkins Award for "distinguished and innovative teachings and methods of instruction in design". The following year, in 1997, he was the first recipient of the Jens Jensen Professorship in Landscape Architecture and Urbanism at the University of Illinois at Chicago's School of Architecture and in 2000 he was the second landscape architect, after Achva Benzinberg Stein, to be chosen for the Daimler-Chrysler Award, which recognizes and promotes innovative design. In 2018, as the first landscape architect ever, James Corner received the honorary doctorate degree (Dr.-Ing. e.h.) from the Technical University of Munich in Germany, Department of Architecture. In 2019, he received an honorary Doctorate of Design (DDes) from Manchester Metropolitan University. In 2026, he received an honorary Doctor of Arts from the University of Pennsylvania.
