= Two Trees Management =

Canadian real estate investment trust

- Industry: Real Estate
- Founded: 1968
- Founder: David Walentas
- Headquarters: New York City, New York, USA
- Key people: Jed Walentas (CEO)

Two Trees Management is a privately held real estate development and management company based in New York City. The company was founded in 1968 by real estate developer David Walentas.

== History ==
Two Trees Management was established in the late 20th century by David Walentas, who began acquiring industrial properties in Dumbo, Brooklyn. By the early 2010s, leadership had transitioned to Jed Walentas, who is chief executive officer.

In 2012, Two Trees reached an agreement to acquire the abandoned Domino Sugar Refinery site in Williamsburg for approximately $185 million, following negotiations with stakeholders and the city. Throughout the 2010s, the site was redeveloped, incorporating residential towers, office space, public waterfront access, and the preservation of the refinery structure itself.

In 2014, the New York City Planning Commission approved a revised $1.5 billion redevelopment plan for the Domino site. Demolition of non-landmarked refinery structures began the same year, followed by phased construction of residential and mixed-use buildings. The first building opened in 2017. Domino Park opened in 2018 and continued development into the 2020s, including the launch of One Domino Square in 2024.

Two Trees also manages a portfolio that includes commercial leasing and mixed-use developments in Williamsburg, Dumbo, and the Flatiron District. 45 Main Street, 55 Washington Street, and 20 Jay Street, located in Dumbo, house 79 design, architecture and real estate firms.

== Properties ==
- Domino Sugar Refinery - mixed-use development and former sugar refinery in the neighborhood of Williamsburg, Brooklyn.
- One South First - residential building in the neighborhood of Williamsburg, Brooklyn.
- One Domino Square – residential development on the Williamsburg waterfront.
- DUMBO – residential, commercial, and retail properties developed and managed across the DUMBO neighborhood of Brooklyn.
- Domino Park - public park along the East River.
