= Edward Jones =

Edward, Eddie, or Ed Jones may refer to:

== Architecture ==
- Edward Vason Jones (1909–1980), American neoclassical architect
- Edward Jones (English architect) (born 1939), English architect who designed the Saïd Business School
- Edward Jones (Welsh architect) (1796–1835), Welsh-born architect and surveyor
- Edward C. Jones (1822–1902), American architect

== Arts and entertainment ==
- Edward Jones (Bardd y Brenin) (1752–1824), Welsh harpist and author
- Edward Elwyn Jones (born 1977), Welsh conductor and organist
- Guitar Slim (Eddie Jones, 1926–1959), American guitarist
- Eddie Jones (jazz musician) (1929–1997), American double bassist
- Eddie "California" Jones, singer with the 1950s American band Emersons
- Eddie Jones (actor) (1934–2019), American actor
- Edward L. Buster Jones (1943–2014), American voice actor
- Eddie Jones (artist) (1935–1999), British SF artist and illustrator
- Edward P. Jones (born 1950), American novelist
- Eddie "One String" Jones (1926–?), American country blues unitar player and vocalist
- Edward Jones (visual effects artist), American producer and visual effects artist
- Edward Smyth Jones (1881–1968), African-American poet

== Business ==
- Edward Jones (statistician) (1856–1920), co-founder of Dow Jones & Company
- Edward Jones Investments, an investment company (founded 1922, formerly known as Edward D. Jones & Co., L.P.)
- Edward D. Jones (1893–1982), investment banker, founder of Edward Jones Investments
- Edward D. "Ted" Jones (1925–1990), his son, businessman and philanthropist
- Edward Lloyd Jones (1874–1934), Australian shorthorn cattle breeder

== Military ==
- Edward Jones (British Army officer, born 1896) (1896–1988), British army brigadier
- Edward Gordon Jones (1914–2007), officer in the Royal Air Force
- Edward Jones (British Army officer, born 1936) (1936–2007), British army general
- Edward Darlington Jones (1885–1954), American Coast Guard admiral

== Politics ==
- Edward Jones (English politician) (died 1609), English politician
- Edward Jones (North Carolina politician) (1950–2012), American state legislator
- Ed Jones (Tennessee politician) (1912–1999), American US Representative from the state of Tennessee
- Edward F. Jones (1828–1913), American New York Lieutenant Governor
- Edward Warburton Jones (1912–1993), Northern Irish politician
- Edward Wadsworth Jones (1840–1934), American Civil War officer, miner and member of the Los Angeles Common Council

== Religion ==
- Edward Jones (martyr) (died 1590), Catholic martyr
- Edward Jones (bishop) (1641–1703), Bishop of St Asaph
- Edward Jones (Methodist preacher) (c. 1741–after 1806), nicknamed "Ginshop" Jones, Welsh Calvinistic Methodist preacher in London
- (Edward) Michael Gresford Jones (1901–1982), Bishop of Willesden and later of St Albans
- Edward Jones (missionary) (1807–1865), African American missionary to the colony of Sierra Leone
- Edward Jones (Canon of Windsor) (1653–1737), Canon of Windsor
- Edward W. Jones (1929–2007), American Episcopal bishop

== Sports ==
=== Association football ===
- Edward Jones (football manager), English football manager of the Egypt national team 1949–1952
- Eddie Jones (footballer, born 1914) (1914–1984), Welsh footballer for Bolton Wanderers and Swindon Town
- Eddie Jones (footballer, born 1952), English former professional footballer
- Eddy Jones (born 2001), Welsh footballer

=== Gridiron football ===
- Ed Jones (defensive back) (born 1952), American football defensive back in the United States and Canada
- Ed "Too Tall" Jones (born 1951), American football defensive end
- Eddie Jones (American football executive) (1938–2012), American football executive
- Eddie Jones (linebacker) (born 1988), American football linebacker

=== Other sports ===
- Edward Jones (lacrosse) (1881–1951), British lacrosse player
- Edward Jones (rugby league), rugby league footballer of the 1910s for Wales, and Broughton Rangers
- Eddie Jones (rugby union) (born 1960), Head coach of the national teams of Australia, Japan and England
- Edward Jones (cricketer) (1896–1978), Welsh cricketer
- Red Borom (Edward Jones Borom, 1915–2011), American baseball player
- Eddie Jones (basketball) (born 1971), American former basketball player
- Ed Jones (racing driver) (born 1995), racing driver from the United Arab Emirates
- Edward Jones Dome, former name (2002–2016) of The Dome at America's Center multi-purpose stadium in St. Louis

== Other ==
- "The boy Jones" (Edward Jones, 1824–1893), notorious intruder into Buckingham Palace between 1838 and 1841
- Edward A. Jones (1903–1981), American linguist, scholar and diplomat
- Edward E. Jones (1926–1993), psychologist
- Edward G. Jones (1939–2011), American neuroscientist
- Edward Taylor Jones (1872–1961), British physicist
- Edward N. Jones, president of Texas Tech University, 1952–1959, per List of Texas Tech University presidents

== See also ==
- Edward Burne-Jones (1833–1898), British artist and designer
- Ted Jones (disambiguation)
- Edgar Jones (disambiguation)
- Edmund Jones (disambiguation)
- Edwin Jones (disambiguation)
- Jones (surname)
