= McIntire School of Commerce =

Undergraduate business school at the University of Virginia

Coordinates: 38°1′59.1″N 78°30′14.8″W

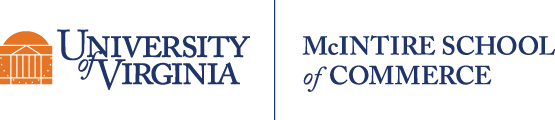
- Type: Public business school
- Established: 1921
- Affiliations: University of Virginia
- Dean: Amanda Cowen (Interim Dean)
- Students: 1,200+ students
- Undergraduates: 690
- Postgraduates: 259
- Location: Charlottesville, Virginia, U.S.
- Campus: Suburban
- Website: www.commerce.virginia.edu

The McIntire School of Commerce is the University of Virginia's undergraduate and graduate business school that specializes in Commerce, Global Commerce, Accounting, Management of Information Technology, and Business Analytics. It was founded in 1921 through a gift by Paul Goodloe McIntire.

The three-year McIntire undergraduate program offers students a B.S. degree in Commerce with concentrations in Accounting, Finance, Information Technology, Management, and Marketing. Undergraduate students at UVA apply to gain admission at the end of their first year; upon acceptance, they enter the Commerce school at the start of their second year.

McIntire offers five graduate programs: M.S. in Commerce, M.S. in Global Commerce, M.S. in Accounting, M.S. in Management of Information Technology, and M.S. in Business Analytics, the latter delivered in partnership with the graduate-only Darden School of Business.

UVA students are eligible to pursue one of four minors at the Commerce School, which include Entrepreneurship, Leadership, and Real Estate, with non-Commerce majors eligible to declare the General Business Minor.

McIntire also offers all UVA students non-degree Commerce Essentials courses, asynchronous one-half-credit online classes that are roughly 8-10 hours long and cover contemporary business subjects and practical skills in multiple areas.

In addition, the school offers a variety of study-abroad programs, including immersive, short-term course programs taught by McIntire faculty or semester-long programs at business school partners around the world.

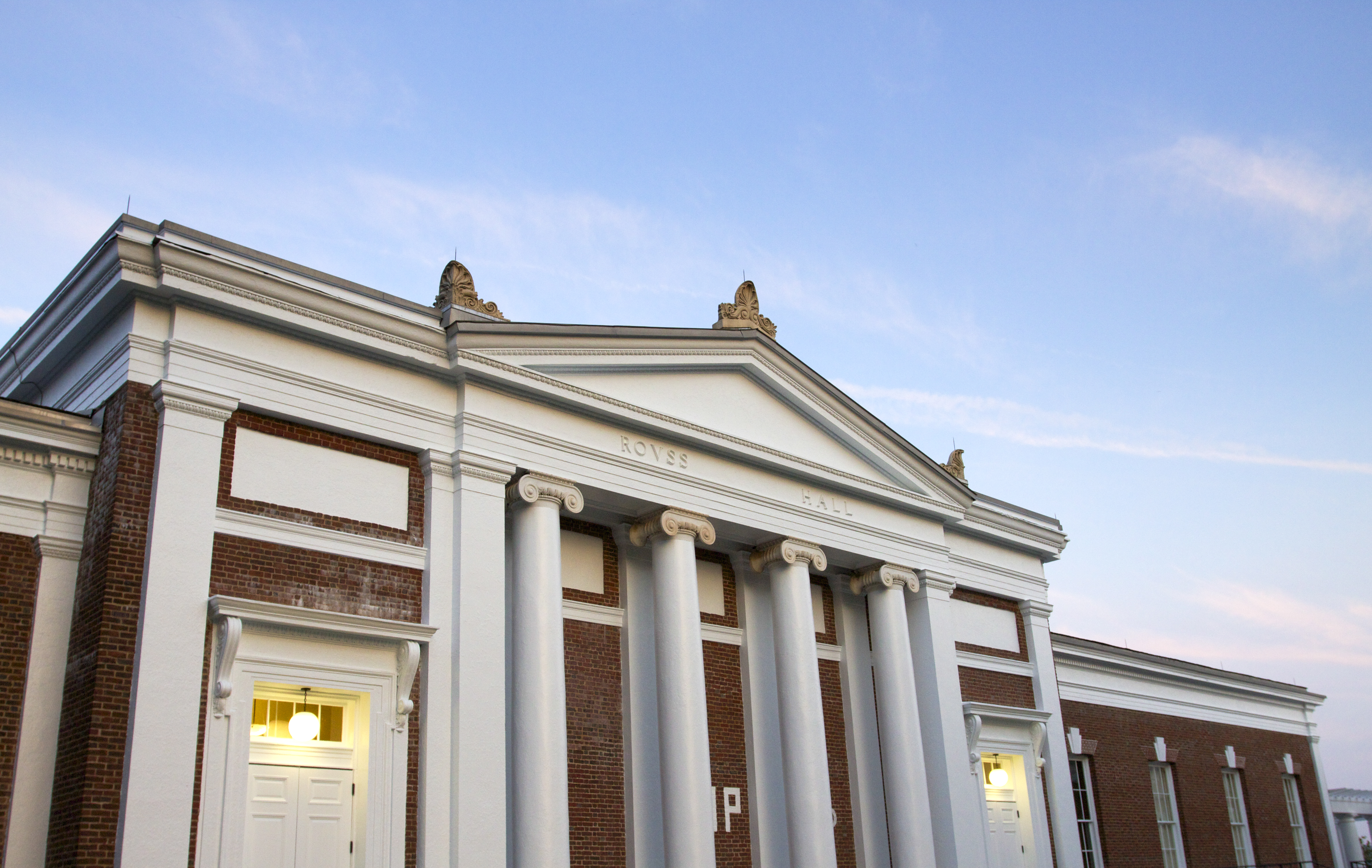
McIntire's Rouss Hall

== History ==
Paul Goodloe McIntire

In 1920, the University of Virginia began offering students majoring in economics the opportunity to specialize in business administration. One year later, a $200,000 donation from stockbroker, alumnus, and Charlottesville philanthropist Paul Goodloe McIntire spurred the establishment of the McIntire School of Commerce and Business Administration. Over the next three decades McIntire operated as a separate entity from the College of Arts and Sciences, but worked closely with the James Wilson School of Economics. In 1952, the University's Board of Visitors approved the establishment of the McIntire School as a professional school to be administered as a separate unit of the University, distinct from the College.

The McIntire School has had five sitting deans: Frank S. Kaulback Jr. (1956-1977), Bill Shenkir (1977-1992), Bonnie Guiton Hill (1992-1996), Carl Zeithaml (1997-2020), Nicole Thorne Jenkins (2020-2025).

== Locations on Grounds ==
In 1930, Monroe Hall was opened as the home for the McIntire School and remained as such through 2007.

In 2007, the School moved from its original location in Monroe Hall to Rouss Hall off the south end of UVA’s historic Lawn. This migration, entitled "Back to the Lawn" by the school, began in April 2005, and was completed in December 2007. The move entailed an extensive expansion and renovation of Rouss Hall, creating a 156,000-square-foot academic complex on the Lawn with adjoining Robertson Hall.

Opening in 2025, the McIntire Expansion Project adds substantially to existing Rouss & Robertson Halls with the construction of Shumway Hall and a renovation of historic Cobb Hall.

In October 2024, the University of Virginia dedicated the Breeden Commerce Grounds and officially named Breeden Way in honor of 1956 McIntire alumnus Ramon W. Breeden Jr., Founder and Chair of The Breeden Company.

== Academics ==
McIntire offers degrees in the following disciplines:

=== B.S. in Commerce ===
The B.S. in Commerce is a 48-credit-hour upper-divisional school program for second-, third-, and fourth-year UVA students.

Students apply for enrollment at McIntire during the spring of their first year. Students accepted into the program begin coursework in the fall of their second year. During their third year of study, students are enrolled in a 12-credit block-style class called the Integrated Core. Blocks are taught by a group of professors, with each professor specializing in an aspect of business (marketing, finance, communications, strategy, systems, organizational behavior, and quantitative analysis). Professors conduct subject-based coursework on a rotating basis to provide students with opportunities to solve unstructured, challenging business problems, and work through them using a holistic, team-based approach.

During their third year of study at McIntire, students are assigned to teams within their blocks. Each team assumes the role of an analyst, and works on a semesterlong project for one of four Fortune 500 companies (Allianz, CarMax, Hilton, or [solidcore], in the 2024–2025 academic year). The team-based project requires students to advise senior management on a problem or objective the company is facing.

Students then specialize in one of five "concentrations": Accounting, Finance, Information Technology, Management, or Marketing (International Business was offered in the past as a concentration, but has since been discontinued.) Students begin taking classes for their concentration in the spring semester of their third year at McIntire. Each concentration has its own coursework, with some required courses fixed for the concentration and other required courses offered to students as a choice of electives; the level of course required, both fixed and elective, varies from concentration to concentration.

McIntire students can also choose to study in an area of specialty that spans across several disciplines, called a "track." Generally, students may select a track during the spring semester of their third year or the start of their fourth year. McIntire students may complete up to two tracks if course scheduling allows, but cannot complete three or more tracks. McIntire offers tracks in Business Analytics, Entrepreneurship, Global Commerce, Quantitative Finance, Real Estate, and Strategic Brand Consulting & Communications.

=== M.S. in Commerce ===
The 10-month, 40-credit-hour M.S. in Commerce integrates foundational business skills; a specialization in biotechnology, business analytics, finance, or marketing & management; and the Global Immersion Experience (GIE). The required GIE is an in-depth overview of the student’s designated region during a one-week residency in Charlottesville, followed by overseas travel with a class cohort on an intensive three-week schedule of academic, company, and cultural visits.

=== M.S. in Global Commerce ===
The M.S. in Global Commerce is a nine-month, 30-credit-hour program offered with partner school ESMT Berlin that prepares business majors and business minors with a globally oriented major for a wide range of careers. Students complete a three-part curriculum at the McIntire School and ESMT Berlin, while completing a Social Impact Project with a global organization.

=== M.S. in Accounting ===
McIntire's M.S. in Accounting is a nine-month, 30-credit-hour program that prepares students for professional practice by sharpening the analytical and technical skills they need to excel in the field of accounting.

=== M.S. in Management of Information Technology ===
The M.S. in MIT is a one-year program that integrates technical and business-related knowledge and skills. The program helps students understand how current and emerging technologies can best be applied to make their organizations more profitable, productive, and competitive. The Northern Virginia-based executive format of the program allows working professionals from a wide range of industries and functional areas of expertise to remain on the job while completing their degree.

=== M.S. in Business Analytics ===
The M.S. in Business Analytics is a one-year program delivered by McIntire faculty in collaboration with UVA’s Darden School of Business at the University's facilities in the downtown Arlington, Va., district of Rosslyn. Intended for early-career professionals with a minimum of two years of work experience, the program combines weekend, in-person, and online instruction to offer students a broad mix of analytical and technical skills as well as foundational business knowledge and leadership instruction.

== Rankings ==
In 2009, McIntire was ranked number one nationally for undergraduate business schools by Bloomberg BusinessWeek. It was the only program to be consistently ranked either first or second from 2006 to 2014.

In 2012, McIntire was ranked as America's fifth best undergraduate business school by U.S. News & World Report.

In 2015, the M.S. in Commerce was ranked first among one-year, pre-work-experience master's in management programs by higher education research website Value Colleges.

In 2017, McIntire's M.S. in Commerce program was ranked second worldwide in master's in management (MiM) programs by The Economist and was the only U.S. school to appear in the top 10.

In 2019, The Economist ranked McIntire's M.S. in Commerce degree as the top U.S.-based master’s in management program and #6 worldwide.

In 2020, Global education organization QS ranked McIntire’s M.S. in Global Commerce the #3 multi-campus program in its QS World Universities Rankings®. The program, also known as Global 3, signifying its unique partnership with two other international institutions, was also named the #11 master’s in management program out of 152 in the world.

In 2021, The Economist ranked McIntire's M.S. in Commerce degree as the #1 fully U.S.-based master’s in management program and #6 worldwide.

In 2026, Poets & Quants, an established source on business schools education, has ranked McIntire as #2 best undergraduate program in the US. It was ranked #4 in 2024 and 2025.

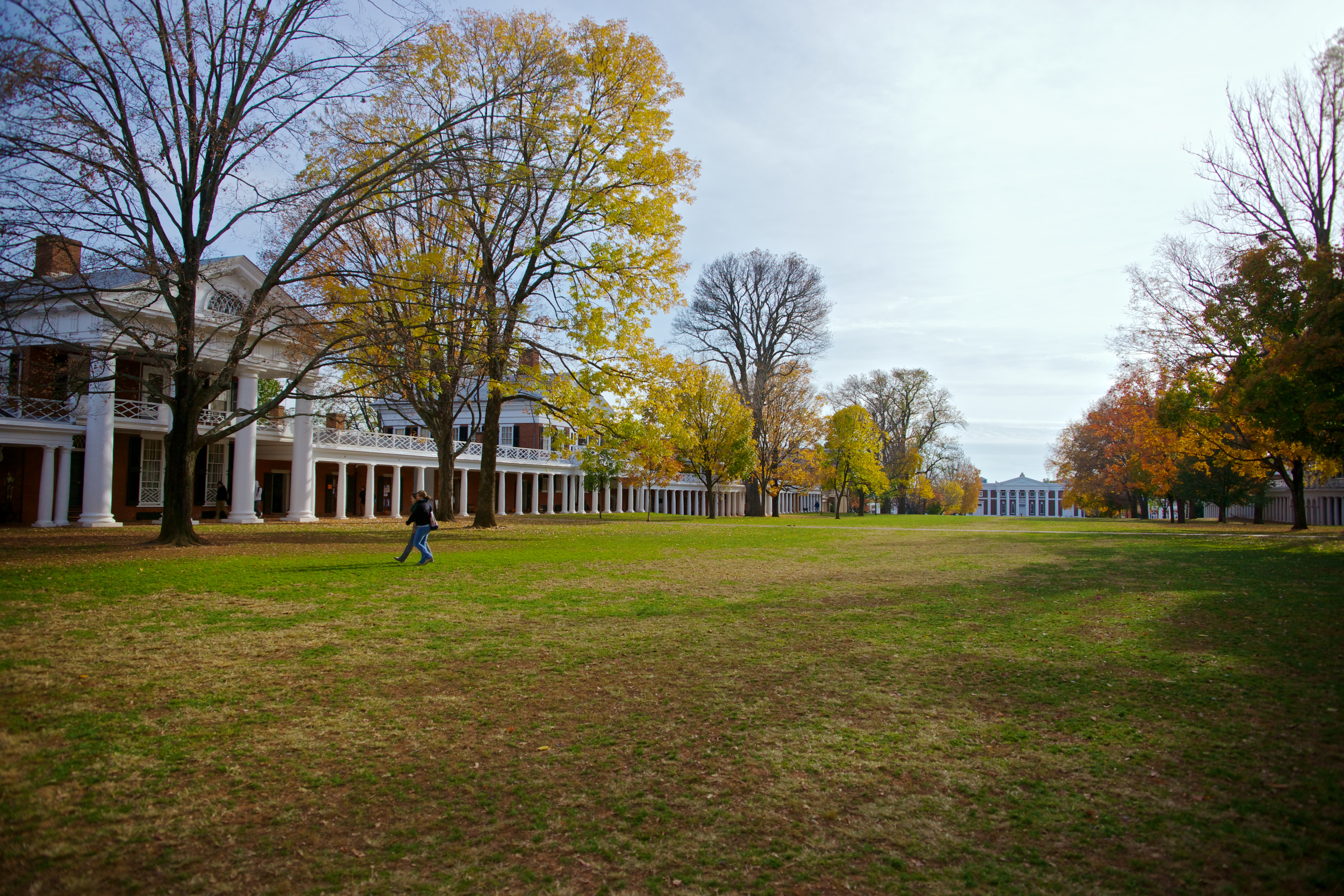
The lawn; McIntire's present home

== Notable alumni ==
- Tiki Barber, former professional football player
- Ronde Barber, former professional football player
- Sonja Hoel Perkins, founder and managing director of the Perkins Fund
- Charles L. Glazer, former U.S. Ambassador to El Salvador
- Brereton Jones, former Governor of Kentucky
- Alexis Ohanian, co-founder of Reddit
- Penny Pennington, managing partner of Edward Jones Investments
- Christopher Nassetta, president and chief executive officer of Hilton Worldwide
- John Connaughton, co-managing partner of investment firm Bain Capital
- Gretchen Walsh, Olympic competitive swimmer
