= Ted Jones =

Ted Jones may refer to:

- Edward D. "Ted" Jones (1925–1990), son of the founder of Edward Jones Investments
- Ted Jones (neuroscientist) (1939–2011), neuroscientist and neuroanatomist
- Ted Jones (hydroplanes) (died 2000), hydroplane designer and driver
- Ted Jones (trade unionist) (1896-1978), Welsh trade union leader
- Teddy Jones (1910–1989), Australian rules footballer
- Ted Jones (Pineapple Express), fictional drug lord and the primary antagonist of Pineapple Express

== See also ==
- Edward Jones (disambiguation)
- Theodore Jones (disambiguation)
