= Edmund Jones (disambiguation) =

Edmund Jones (1918–2019) was an American politician in the state of Pennsylvania.

Edmund Jones may also refer to:

- E. E. Jones (Edmund Evans Jones), American football coach
- Edmund Britten Jones (1888–1953), Australian physician
- Edmund Jones (MP), MP for Breconshire 1654 and 1659
- Edmund Jones (preacher) (1702–1793), Welsh preacher

== See also ==
- Edward Jones (disambiguation)
- Edgar Jones (disambiguation)
- Edwin Jones (disambiguation)
