= Jones-Confluence Point State Park =

State park in Missouri, United States

Confluence Point State Park
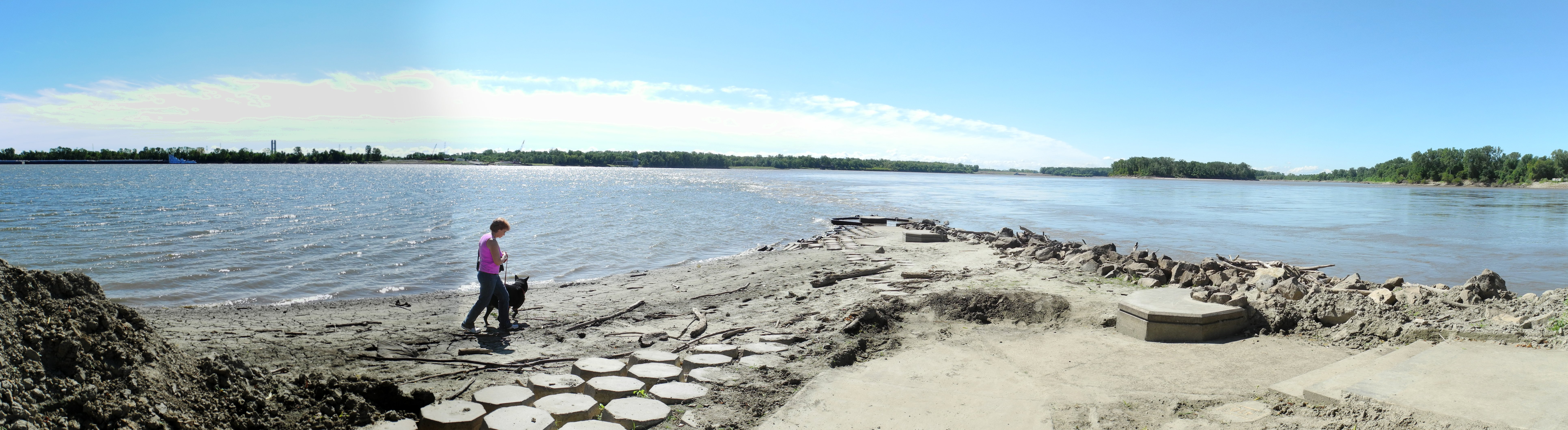
- Confluence Point with the Mississippi on the left and the Missouri on the right

- Location within Missouri Location within the United States
- Location: West Alton, Missouri, United States
- Coordinates: 38°49′3″N 90°7′11″W
- Area: 1,121.43 acres (453.83 ha)
- Established: 2001
- Administrator: Missouri Department of Natural Resources
- Visitors: 48,796 (in 2023)
- Website: Official website

Edward "Ted" and Pat Jones-Confluence Point State Park is a public recreation area located on the north side of the Missouri River at its confluence with the Mississippi River in St. Charles County, Missouri. The state park encompasses 1,121 acres (454 ha) of shoreline and bottomland and is managed by the Missouri Department of Natural Resources, which "plans to restore a natural floodplain reminiscent of what Lewis and Clark might have seen along the lower Missouri River." The park is part of the Mississippi Greenway (formerly known as the Confluence Greenway) and sits opposite the Columbia Bottom Conservation Area on the south bank of the Missouri River.

== History ==
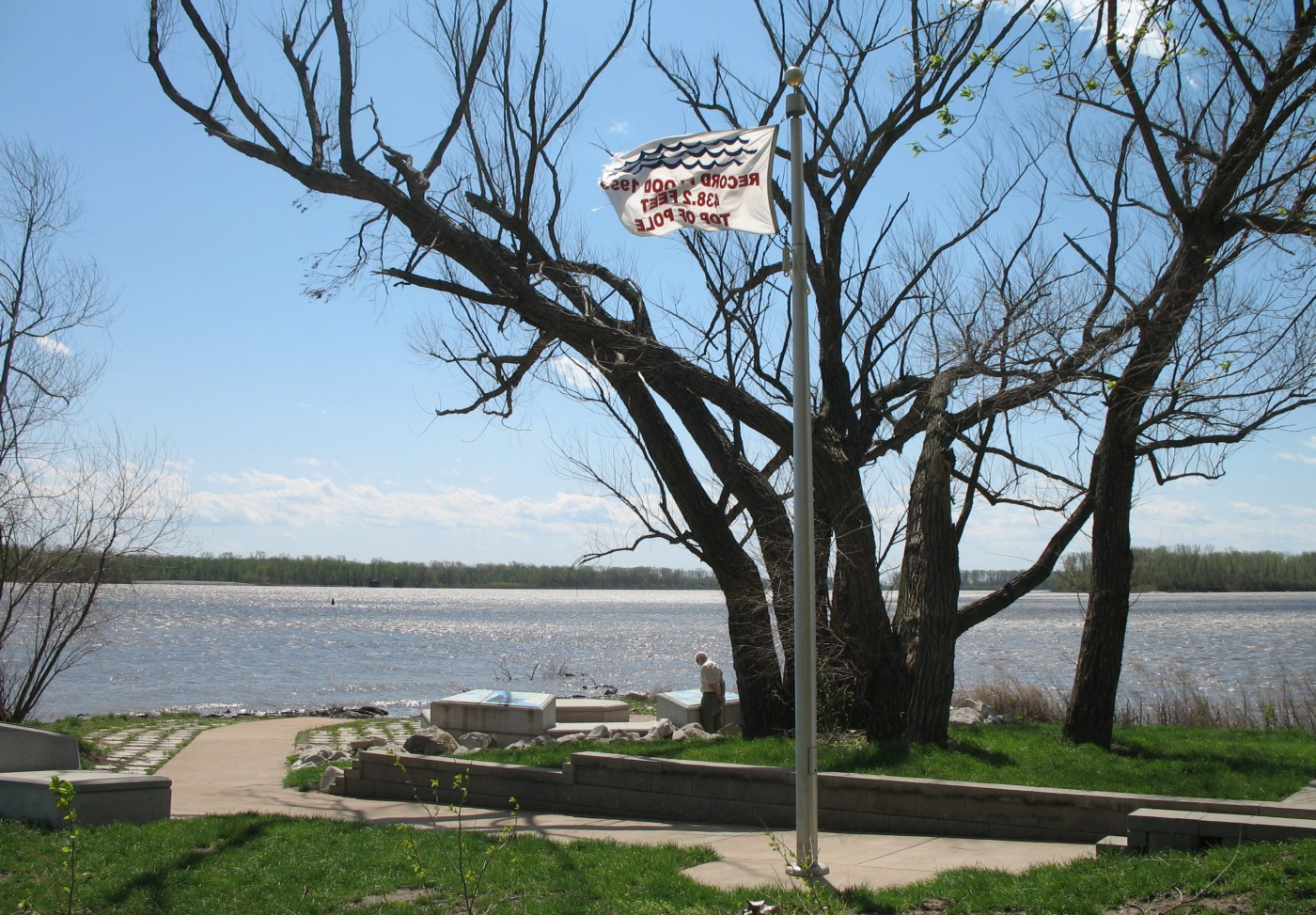
The park's monument to the Great Flood of 1993, when water reached the top of the pole and was at 438.2 feet. The confluence site is normally 400 feet above sea level. The Mississippi is on the left and Missouri on the right.

The Lewis and Clark Expedition began at the confluence in 1804, and the explorers returned there at the end of their journey. Following the purchase of the site through the aid of a grant from the Danforth Foundation, the Western Rivers Conservancy conveyed the land to the Missouri Department of Natural Resources and the Metropolitan Parks and Recreation District in 2001. The park opened May 9, 2004. It is named for Edward Jones Investments heir Edward D. "Ted" Jones and his wife Pat Jones, who donated $2.2 million for development of the Katy Trail.

== Activities and amenities ==
The area offers short trails, interpretive kiosks, and birdwatching.
