= Theresia Gouw =

Indonesian-American entrepreneur and venture capital

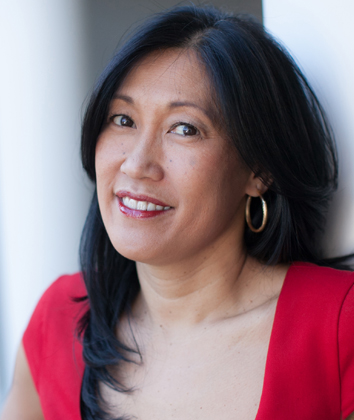
- Gouw in 2014
- Born: Indonesia
- Education: Brown University, Stanford Graduate School of Business
- Occupations: Co-founder and Managing Partner, Acrew Capital
- Website: acrewcapital.com

Theresia Gouw is an Indonesian-born American billionaire venture capitalist and entrepreneur. After emigrating to the United States as a child, she studied engineering at Brown University and earned an MBA from Stanford. Gouw worked as a management consultant at Bain & Company, co-founded the software company Release Software, and spent 15 years at Accel Partners, becoming the firm's first female partner and managing partner. She co-founded the early-stage firm Aspect Ventures in 2014 and later co-founded Acrew Capital in 2019.

In 2025, Forbes described Gouw as America's first billionaire female venture capitalist. As of November 2026, Forbes estimated her net worth at $1.1 billion.

== Early life ==
Gouw was born in Indonesia to parents of Chinese descent. Amid political violence against ethnic Chinese during President Suharto’s rule, her family fled the country and immigrated to the United States when she was three years old. Her father, a dentist, and her mother, a nurse, took service jobs after arriving in upstate New York and her father later re‑qualified to practice dentistry at the State University of New York at Buffalo. The family settled in a small town near Buffalo, where Gouw has said she learned mathematics by watching Buffalo Bills football games with her father.

In 1986, Gouw became the first person in her high school to enroll at Brown University. She graduated magna cum laude in 1990 with a degree in engineering. After Brown, she worked as a management consultant at Bain & Company and later obtained an MBA from the Stanford Graduate School of Business in 1996.

== Career ==
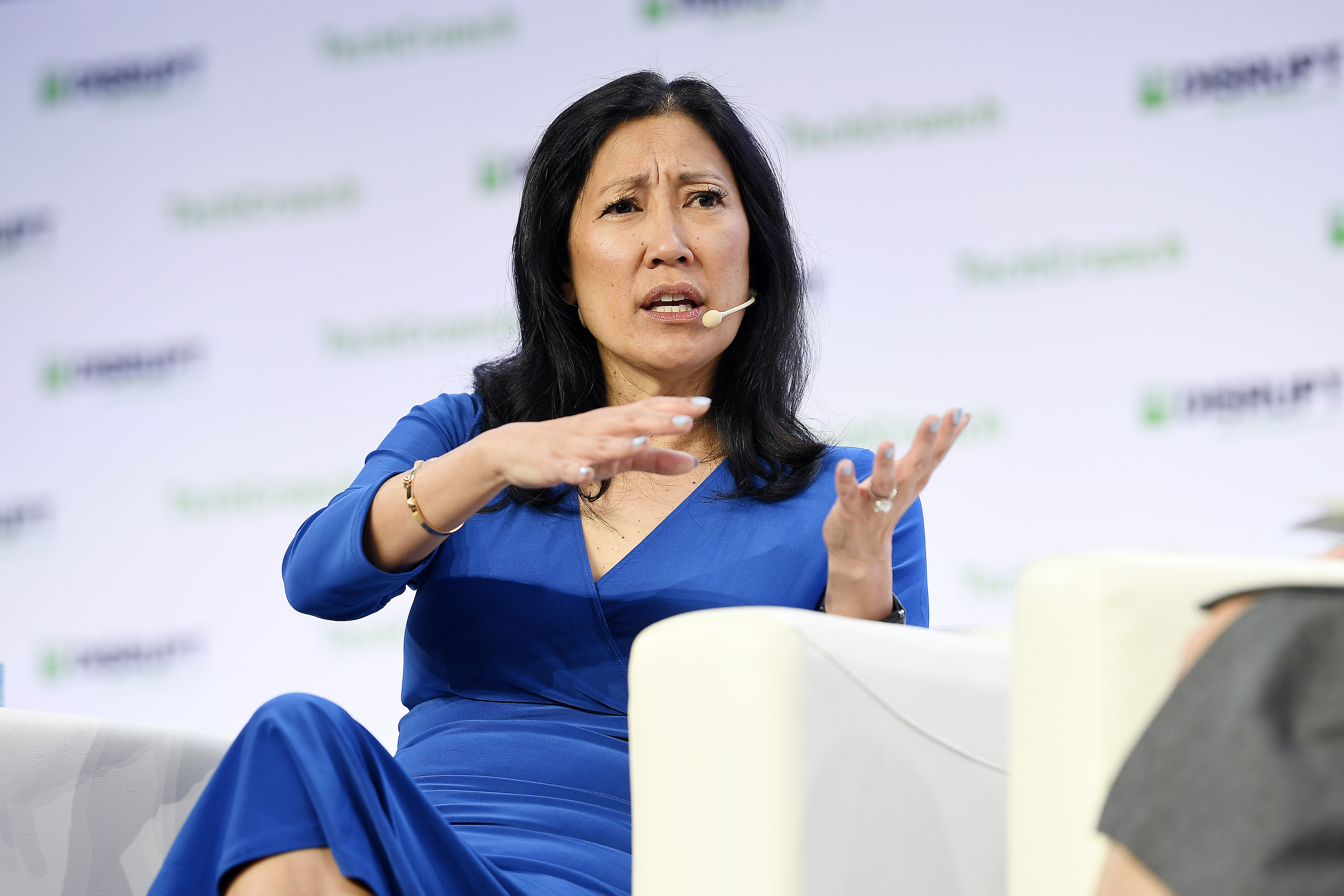
Gouw in 2019

=== Release Software and early career ===
After graduating from Stanford in 1996, Gouw and other business school classmates co-founded Release Software, a SAAS startup that developed payments technology. She left the company before a planned initial public offering in the late 1990s because of high executive turnover.

=== Accel Ventures ===
Gouw joined Accel Partners as an investment associate in 1999. She later became the firm's first female partner. She worked with Accel partner Jim Breyer on the firm's 2005 investment in Facebook (now Meta Platforms). Forbes later estimated that she held around eight million Facebook shares at the company’s 2012 initial public offering, but that she gradually diversified her stake. Gouw left Accel in 2013.

=== Aspect Ventures ===
In 2014, Gouw co-founded Aspect Ventures, an early stage venture capital firm, with fellow venture capital investor Jennifer Fonstad. Gouw and Fonstad worked together early in their careers at Bain & Company and at Release Software.

During the first year, Aspect Ventures made several Series A and seed investments funded by the co-founders' personal capital. Aspect secured $150 million for its debut fund, which included outside capital from Limited Partners, and followed it with a second fund of $181 million in early 2018.

The founders decided to split in 2019 over clashing management styles. Both founders started new venture capital firms. Fonstad started a new firm called Owl Capital and Gouw along with some other Aspect Venture staff started Acrew Capital.

=== Acrew Capital ===
In 2019, Gouw co-founded Acrew Capital with Lauren Kolodny, Vishal Lugani, Asad Khaliq and Mark Kraynak. Acrew invests between roughly US$1 million and US$20 million in early‑stage startups and operates two primary funds. In 2021, Acrew launched a new fund called The Diversify Capital Fund, which aims to diversify the boards and cap tables of pre-IPO, late stage companies.

In 2024, Gouw was part of a consortium of venture capital and private equity executives that purchased a minority stake in the Buffalo Bills.

== Board member and advisor ==
Gouw serves as vice-chair of the board of DonorsChoose.

== Personal life ==
Gouw lives in Palo Alto, California, and has two children. She divorced in 2013. Her personal wealth has been shaped by her stake in Meta Platforms (formerly Facebook) and other venture investments. In June 2025, Forbes described her as the first woman venture capitalist in the United States to become a billionaire.
