= Columbia Bottom Conservation Area =

Protected land in Missouri, U.S.

- IUCN category IV (habitat/species management area)
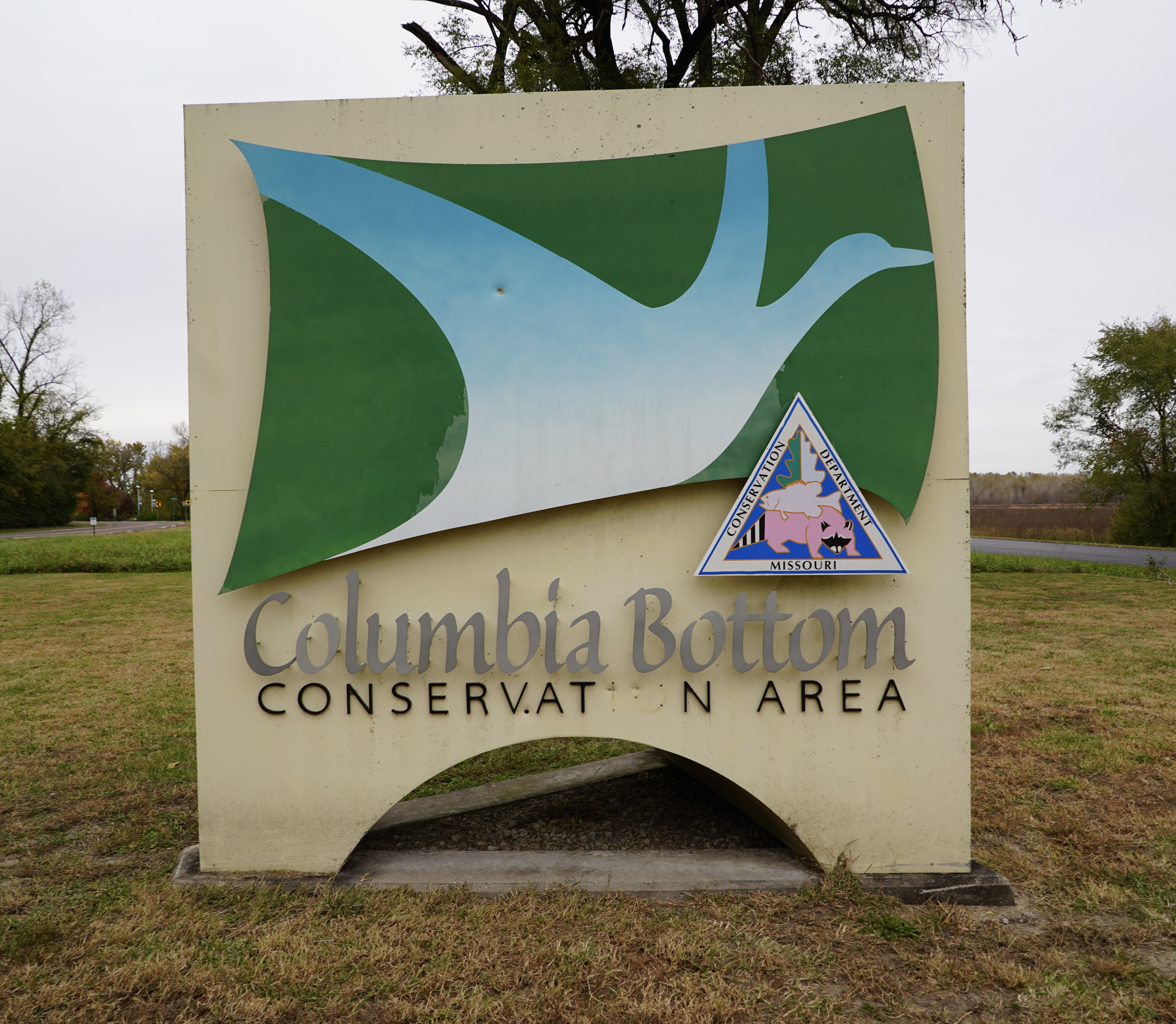
- Columbia Bottom Conservation Area

- Location within Missouri
- Location: St. Louis County, Missouri, USA
- Nearest city: Spanish Lake, MO
- Coordinates: 38°48′29″N 90°09′06″W
- Area: 4,256 acres (17.2 km^{2})
- Established: 1997
- Governing body: Missouri Department of Conservation
- Website: nature.mdc.mo.gov/discover-nature/places/columbia-bottom-ca

The Columbia Bottom Conservation Area is a 4,256-acre (17.22 km^{2}) conservation area located on the south side of the Missouri River at its confluence with the Mississippi River. The conservation area, which is located in eastern St. Louis County, Missouri, north of the city of St. Louis, is operated by the Missouri Department of Conservation. One key asset is 6.5-mile (10.5 km) of river frontage for boating, fishing, and birdwatching.

== History and description ==
The mouth of the Missouri River was at first thought to be a good site for commercial development, and the would-be town of Columbia, Missouri was platted on the south bank of the confluence. However, the wetland character of the site made it sub-optimal for development. At a later point the site was re-platted as St. Vrain, Missouri, but both developments were fated to become ghost towns by 1870, and it is not known how many inhabitants either community had.

Following the failure of the ghost towns, the Columbia Bottom reverted to being wet-footed but fertile farmland. The current conservation area was formed in 1997 as a result of the land condemnations that followed the Great Flood of 1993. Patches of the area continued to be managed by the private sector as agricultural land as of 2011.

The nearest limited access highway exit is Exit 34 on Interstate 270, at the northern tip of the city of St. Louis. From this exit it is 2.8-mile (4.5 km) north on Columbia Bottom Road to the entrance to the conservation area.

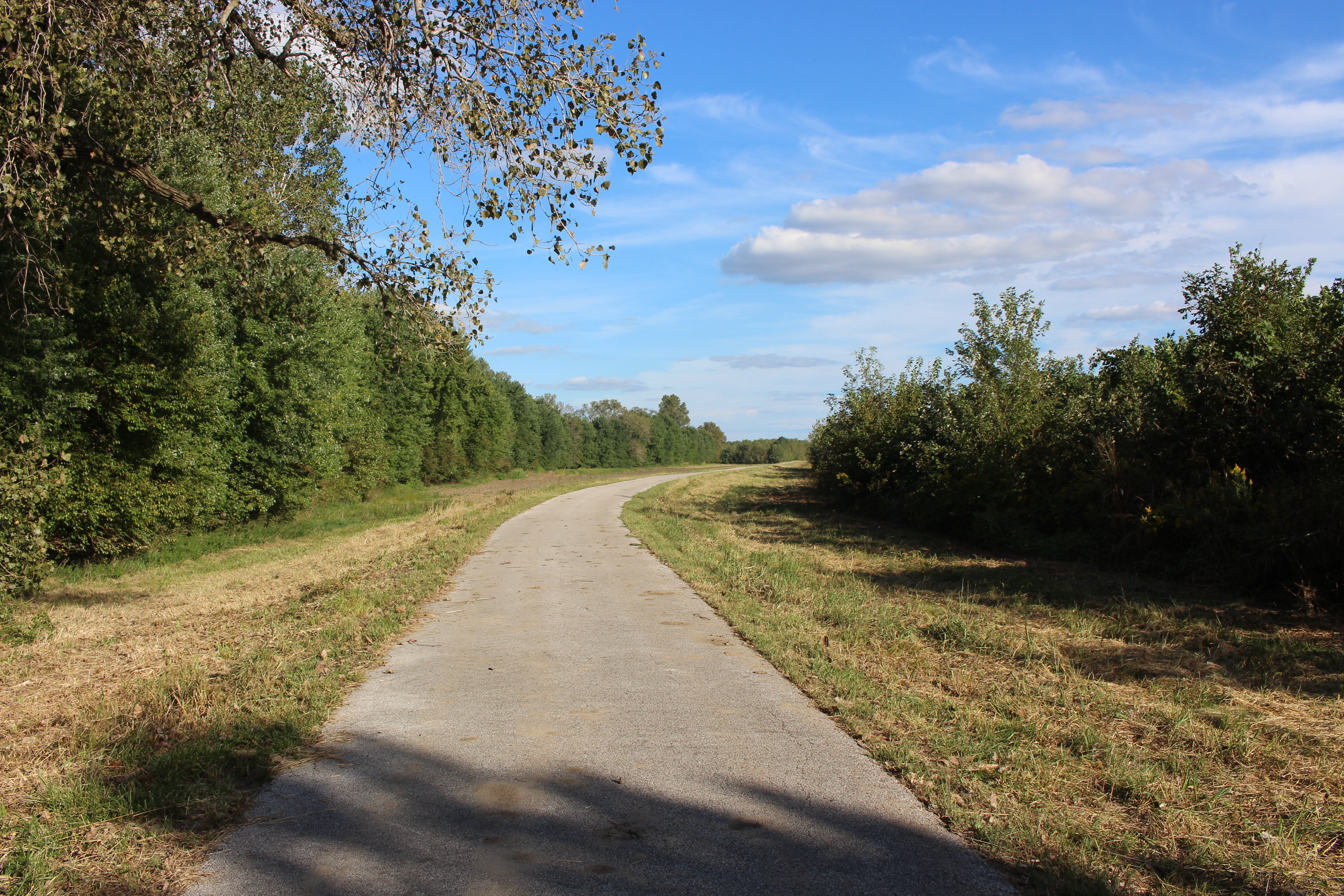
Trail at Columbia Bottom Conservation Area

Admission to the conservation area was free as of 2011. A parking lot and graveled overlook, completed in 2002, provided access to the river confluence, and a visitor center, completed in 2004, stood close to the entrance.

The conservation area is located across the Missouri River from the Jones-Confluence Point State Park.

== Wildlife ==
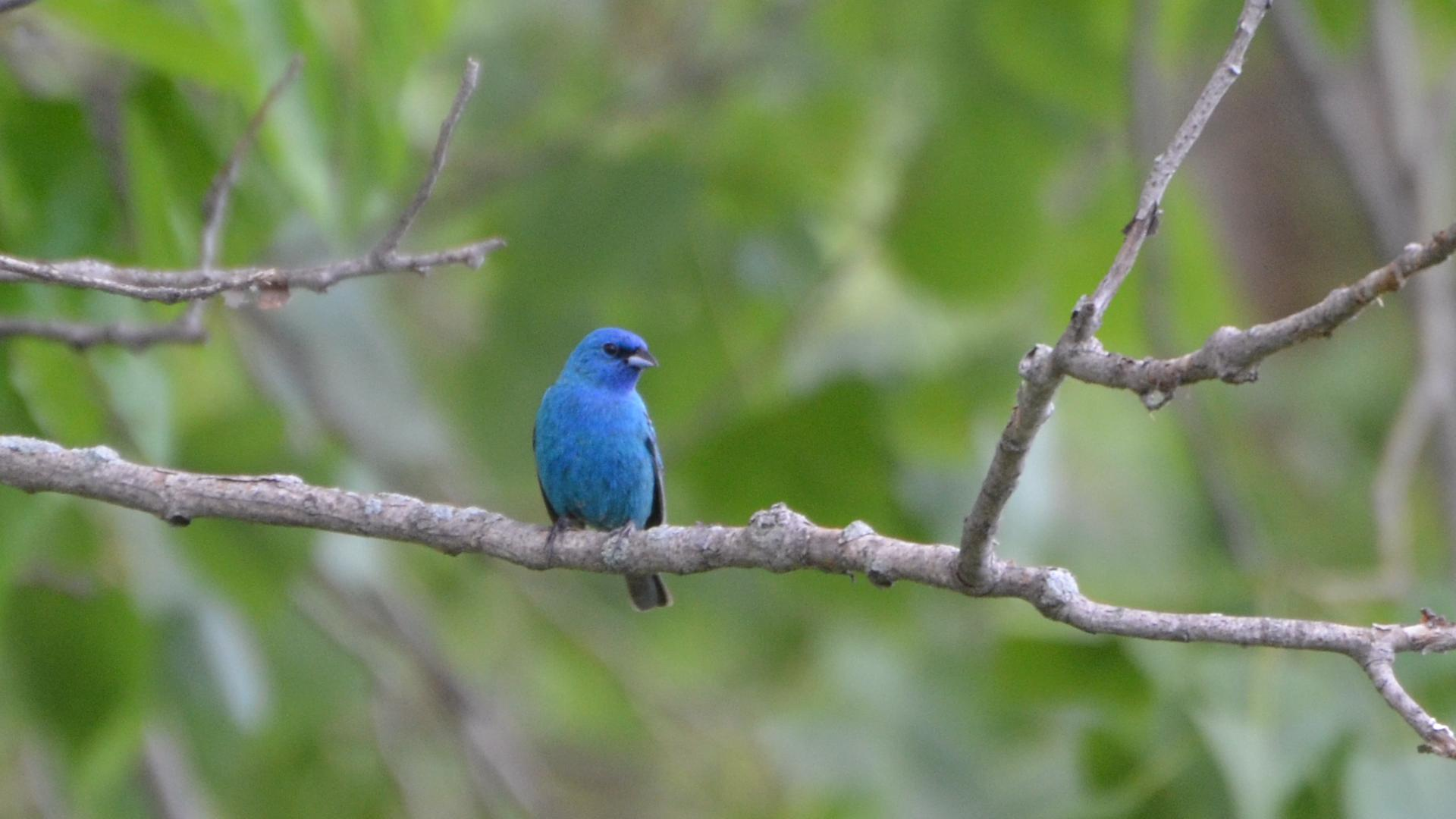
Indigo bunting at Conservation Area in June 2013

While the Columbia Bottom Conservation Area was originally planned as a place for sportspeople to carry out the taking of game animals such as the whitetail deer and Canada goose, the area has proved to be a popular place for wetland birdwatching. For example, as of 2011 the Audubon Society of Missouri operated field trips to the area, with special attention to significant populations of the snowy egret.

== See also ==
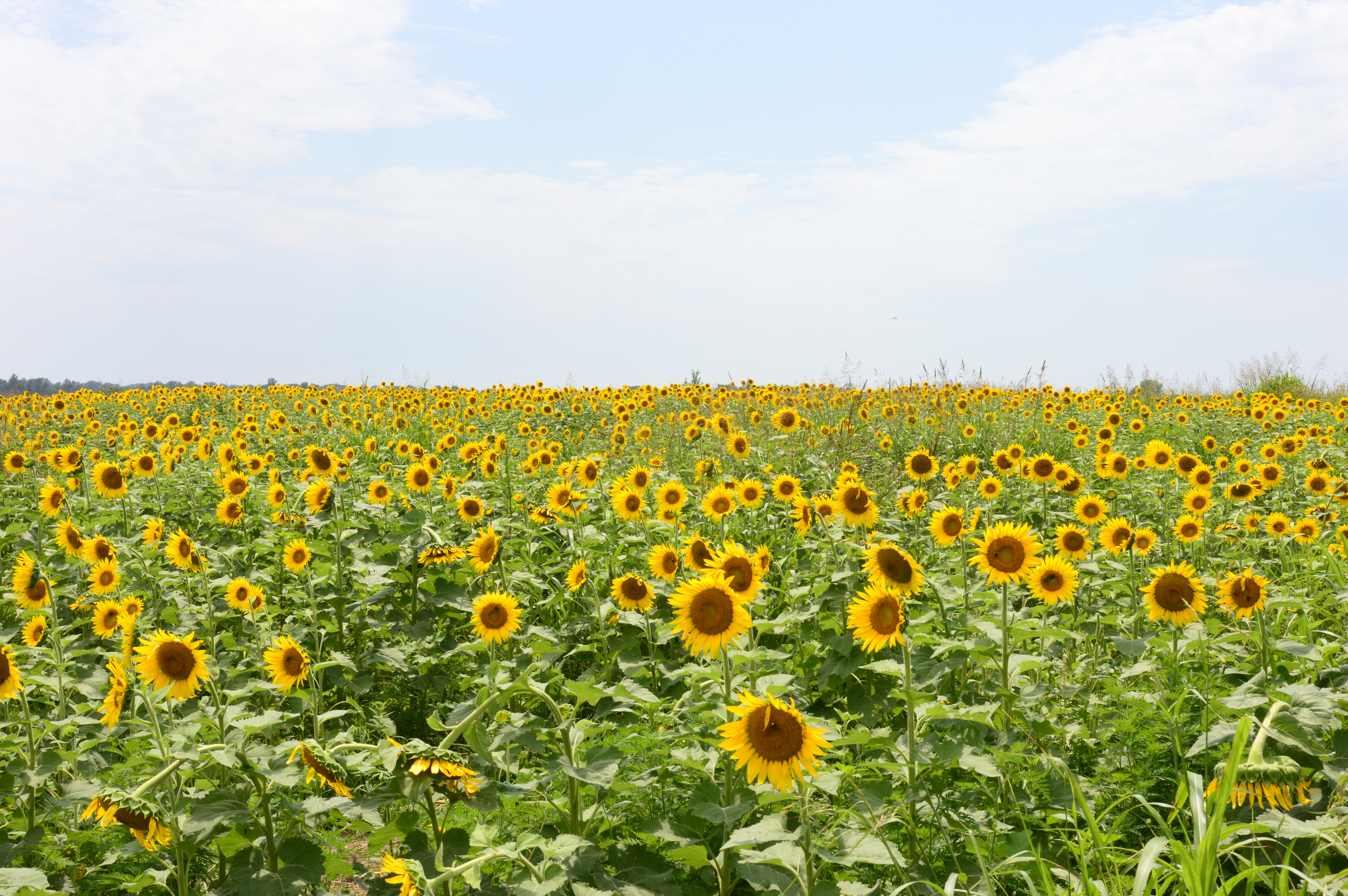
A field of sunflowers planted to benefit wildlife and pollinators.

- Jones-Confluence Point State Park
