= Edgar Jones =

Edgar Jones may refer to:

- Edgar Jones (actor) (1874–1958), American actor
- Edgar Dewitt Jones (1876–1956), American clergyman and author
- Edgar Jones (politician) (1878–1962), British Member of Parliament for Merthyr Tydfil, 1910–1918, and Merthyr, 1918–1922
- Edgar C. Jones (1903–1980), American football player, college athletic director
- Edgar Jones (Australian footballer) (1907–1970), Australian rules footballer
- Edgar Jones (rugby) (1910–1986), rugby union and rugby league footballer of the 1930s for Wales (RU), Llanelli, and Leeds (RL)
- Edgar Jones (running back) (1920–2004), former running back for the Cleveland Browns
- Edgar Jones (basketball) (born 1956), retired American basketball player
- Edgar Jones (musician) (born 1970), English musician, formerly of the Stairs
- Edgar Jones (linebacker) (born 1984), linebacker/Defensive end for the Dallas Cowboys

== See also ==
- Edward Jones (disambiguation)
- Jones (disambiguation)
