= Sonja Hoel Perkins =

Venture capitalist

Sonja Hoel Perkins is a venture capitalist, founder and managing director of the Perkins Fund and a co-founder of Broadway Angels. Before starting her own fund, Perkins worked as a venture capitalist at Menlo Ventures. In 2015, Worth magazine ranked her among the 100 Most Powerful People in Finance in the World.

== Education ==
External media

Audio
- KALW, Inflection Point with Lauren Schiller, NPR, 2016

Video
- Honoree Sonja Hoel Perkins at the 2016 Girls Inc, Girls Inc., 19 April 2017

Sonja Hoel grew up in Charlottesville, Virginia and graduated from the McIntire School of Commerce at the University of Virginia. After working for TA Associates in Boston as an analyst, she graduated from the Harvard Business School.

== Career in venture capital ==
Perkins began working as a venture capitalist at Menlo Ventures on Sand Hill Road in Menlo, California in 1994. At age 29, she was the youngest-ever general partner to join Menlo Ventures. She worked for 22 years at Menlo Ventures before starting her own firm, The Perkins Fund. Her investments have included Acme Packet, F5 Networks and McAfee Associates. She has served on the board of directors of over 50 companies. Forty percent of the angel investments made by Sonja Hoel Perkins have been in companies started by women.

In 2010, Perkins and Jennifer Fonstad helped to found Broadway Angels, an invitation-only angel investing network to bring together senior women from the fields of technology and venture investing. Rather than investing as a group, they use their collective networking resources to bring in entrepreneurs - both male and female - who may be of interest to individual members.

Perkins lives in the Pacific Heights neighborhood of San Francisco, California.

== See also ==
- Jennifer Fonstad
