= Theodore Jones =

Theodore Jones may refer to:

- Theodore A. Jones (1912–2001), American insurance executive
- Theodore S. Jones (1919–1976), American politician, Wisconsin State Assemblyman
- Theodore T. Jones (1944–2012), American judge in the New York State Court of Appeals
- Theodore W. Jones (1853–1943) Canadian-born American businessman, politician
- Ted Joans (1928–2003), American jazz poet; his birth name
- Young Greatness (Theodore Joseph Jones III, 1984–2018), American rapper
- Mookie Jones (Theodore Todd Jones IV, born 1990), American basketball player
- Theodore Jones, one of the discoverers of the Baltimore gold hoard, 1934
- Theodore Jones (fl. 1826), English accountant, inventor of the Wire wheel

== See also ==
- Ted Jones (disambiguation)
