= List of companies that halted U.S. political contributions in January 2021 =

In January 2021, a number of companies halted their political contributions in the United States, primarily in response to some Republican legislators' objections to certification of the 2021 United States Electoral College vote count and the ensuing mob that attacked the U.S. Capitol. All of these companies announced suspension of donations to legislators and/or executive branch members who were challenging the vote certification, unless otherwise stated.

== # ==
- 3M – Halted all political donations for further review

== A ==
- ADM – Halted all political donations for further review
- Aflac – Resumed political donations in June 2021
- Airbnb
- Amazon
- American Airlines – Resumed political donations in June 2021
- American Express
- American Investment Council – Halted all political donations for further review
- AT&T

== B ==
- BAE Systems – Resumed political donations in March 2021
- Bank of America – Halted all political donations for further review
- Best Buy
- BlackRock – Halted all political donations for further review
- Blue Cross Blue Shield Association
- Boeing – Resumed political donations in May 2021
- Booz Allen Hamilton – Halted all political donations for further review
- Boston Scientific – Halted all political donations for further review
- BP – Halted all political donations for further review

== C ==
- Cargill – Halted all political donations for further review
- Cboe Global Markets – Halted all political donations for further review
- Charles Schwab – Permanently halted all political donations, shut down PAC
- Cheniere Energy – Halted all political donations for further review
- Cigna – Pledged to "discontinue support of elected officials who encouraged or supported violence, or hindered the peaceful transition of power" in public statement issued January 2021; clarified that voting against certification of the 2020 presidential election did not rise to that standard and resumed donations as of April 2021
- Cisco Systems
- Citigroup – Halted all political donations for further review
- CME Group – Halted all political donations for further review
- The Coca-Cola Company
- Comcast – Halted all political donations for further review
- Commerce Bancshares
- ConocoPhillips – Halted all political donations for further review

== D ==
- Deloitte
- Disney
- Dow Chemical
- Duke Energy – Paused all political contributions for 30 days

== E ==
- Edison International – Halted all political donations for further review
- Edward Jones Investments – Halted all political donations for further review
- Exelon

== F ==
- Facebook, Inc. – Halted all political donations for further review
- FedEx – Halted all political donations for further review
- FirstEnergy – Halted all political donations for further review
- Ford Motor Company – Halted all political donations for further review; resumed political donations in June 2021 after getting input from members of its employee-funded PAC
- Freeport-McMoRan – Halted all political donations for further review

== G ==
- General Electric
- General Motors – Announced suspension to political donations in January 2021, along with statement that "[c]haracter and public integrity aligning with GM's core values" would factor into future donations; resumed political donations in June 2021
- Gilead Sciences – Halted all political donations for further review
- Goldman Sachs – Halted all political donations for further review
- Google – Halted all political donations for further review

== H ==
- Hallmark Cards – Additionally asked two Senators to return contributions
- Hilton Worldwide – Suspended political donations in March 2020; announced in January 2021 that it will keep donations "suspended indefinitely"
- Honeywell
- Huntington Ingalls Industries – Resumed political donations in June 2021

== I ==
- Intel – Halted all political donations for further review
- Intercontinental Exchange – Halted all political donations for further review
- Investment Company Institute – Halted all political donations for further review

== J ==
- JBS USA – Halted all political donations for further review
- JetBlue – Resumed political donations in April 2021
- JPMorgan Chase – Halted all political donations for further review

== K ==
- Kraft Heinz
- Kroger – Halted all political donations for further review

== L ==
- Leidos – Resumed political donations in June 2021
- Loan Syndications and Trading Association – Halted all political donations for further review
- Lockheed Martin – Resumed political donations in June 2021

== M ==
- Major League Baseball – Halted all political donations for further review
- Managed Funds Association – Halted all political donations for further review
- Marathon Petroleum – Halted all political donations for further review
- Marriott International
- MassMutual
- Mastercard
- McDonald's – Halted all political donations for further review
- Microsoft – Halted all political donations for further review
- Morgan Stanley

== N ==
- Nasdaq, Inc. – Halted all political donations for further review
- National Association of Realtors – Resumed political donations in April 2021
- Nike, Inc.
- Northrop Grumman – Resumed political donations in June 2021

== P ==
- PepsiCo – Halted all political donations for further review
- PricewaterhouseCoopers

== R ==
- Raytheon Technologies – Halted all political donations for further review
- Rocket Holdings (Quicken Loans) – Announced a $750,000 donation to Joe Biden's inauguration committee, then halted all political donations for further review

== S ==
- Salesforce – Halted all political donations for further review
- Smithfield Foods – Halted all political donations for further review
- Southern Company – Pledged to "discontinue support for any official or organization" who lacked "values we follow as a business — honesty, respect, fairness, integrity and the value of diversity"; resumed donating to politicians who contested the 2020 presidential election as of June 2021
- Squire Patton Boggs – Halted all political donations for further review
- State Street Corporation

== T ==
- Target Corporation – Halted all political donations for further review
- Toyota – Resumed political donations in April 2021
- Tyson Foods – Resumed political donations in June 2021

== U ==
- United Parcel Service – Resumed political donations in June 2021

== V ==
- Valero Energy – Halted all political donations for further review
- Verizon
- Visa Inc. – Halted all political donations for further review

== W ==
- Walmart
- Wells Fargo – Halted all political donations for further review
