= John Connaughton (business executive) =

American business executive

- Education: University of Virginia (BS) Harvard University (MBA)
- Occupation: Businessman

John Connaughton is an American businessman. He is the chair of Boston-based investment firm Bain Capital. He is known for his investments in the healthcare industry.

== Early life ==
Connaughton was born in 1965. He received a B.S. from the University of Virginia in 1987, and an M.B.A. from Harvard Business School in 1994.

== Career ==
In 1989, Connaughton began working at Bain Capital, transitioning from Bain & Company. Connaughton ran the firm's global private equity business and became co-managing partner in April 2016.

In 2002, Connaughton, along with several other Bain Capital partners, joined with a larger group of private equity and finance executives to acquire the Boston Celtics.

=== Board memberships ===
In 2003, Connaughton was appointed to a supervisory board membership at ProSiebenSat.1 Media, a German broadcasting group. From 2004 to 2013, Connaughton served on the Board of Directors for Warner Chilcott. Connaughton joined the Board of Trustees for Berklee College of Music in 2005.

In 2008, he became a director of Quintiles Transnational Corp, a healthcare company in the field of clinical research. In 2016, Quintiles merged with IMS Health, a health IT company, to become IQVIA. Connaughton became a director of IQVIA in October that year. Connaughton was appointed to the board of HCA Healthcare for a term through 2014. He was also appointed to the board of trustees of the Roxbury Latin School for boys for a term through 2022.

In September 2019, Connaughton joined the board of directors of the University of Virginia's Investment Management Company. He has also served on the Board of Trustees at the university's McIntire School of Commerce. In 2021, he was appointed to the board of GreenLight Fund, a nonprofit fund in the Boston area.

Connaughton is also on the Advisory Board for the Baltimore Orioles, the Harvard Business School Board of Dean’s Advisors, a Brigham & Women’s Hospital trustee, and Board Chair of the University of Virginia Investment Management Company (UVIMCO).

== Philanthropy ==
Connaughton donated to the development of the Berklee Global Jazz Institute, which opened in 2010. In 2019, Connaughton and his wife donated $5 million to the McIntire School of Commerce at the University of Virginia to create the Connaughton Alternative Investing Professorship Fund.

In 2023, Connaughton donated $10 million to the University of Virginia’s McIntire School of Commerce to help establish the Connaughton Bicentennial Scholars Fund. The donation helped to provide need-based scholarships for undergraduate students and launch “Commerce for the Common Good,” an initiative that aims to promote innovation and cultural fluency on the university campus.

== Personal life ==
In 2012, Connaughton lived in Brookline, Massachusetts with his wife Stephanie Connaughton, who is the founding partner of Boston Unity, a franchise expansion team in the National Women's Soccer League.
