= Edwin Jones =

Edwin Jones may refer to:

- Edwin Arthur Jones (1853–1911), American composer
- Edwin B. Jones (1917–1998), American business executive
- Edwin B. Jones (politician) (died 1946), American politician from Virginia
- Edwin J. Jones (1858–1930), American businessman and politician
- Edwin Jones (footballer) (1891–1953), English footballer who played for Bristol City and Exeter City
- Edwin Jones (department store), a store in Southampton, now part of the Debenhams group

== See also ==
- Edward Jones (disambiguation)
