= Jennifer Fonstad =

American venture capital investor (born 1965)

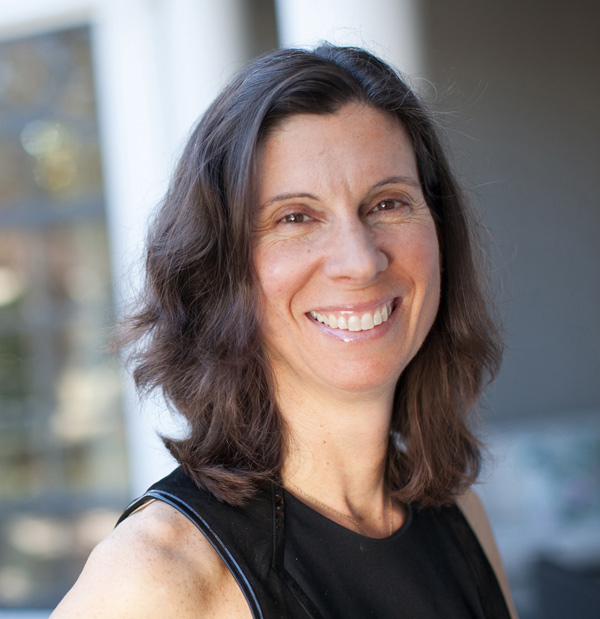
- Born: November 27, 1965 (age 60)
- Education: Georgetown University; Harvard Business School
- Occupation: Venture capital investor
- Title: Co-Founder and Managing Partner, Owl Capital Group
- Children: 4
- Website: owlcapital.com

Jennifer Fonstad (born November 27, 1965) is an American venture capital investor and entrepreneur. She is the managing partner and a co-founder of the Owl Capital Group, a venture firm based in Silicon Valley. Fonstad was the Managing Director of Draper Fisher Jurvetson (DFJ) for 17 years. She is also a co-founder of angel investing network Broadway Angels.

== Education ==
Fonstad earned a Bachelor of Science in International Economics from Georgetown University and an MBA with Distinction from Harvard Business School. While a student at Harvard, Fonstad co-founded the New Venture Competition, an annual competition for HBS student entrepreneurs.

== Career ==
=== Early career ===
Fonstad began her career at Bain & Company after spending a year teaching high school math in sub-Saharan Africa. She joined venture capital firm Draper Fisher Jurvetson as a Kauffman Fellow in 1997 and became a partner in 1998.

In 2010, Fonstad and Sonja Hoel Perkins were among the founders of Broadway Angels, an angel investing network of senior women from the fields of technology and venture investing.

=== Aspect Ventures ===
In 2014, Fonstad co-founded Aspect Ventures, an early stage, all-female venture-capital firm, with fellow venture capital investor Theresia Gouw. Gouw and Fonstad worked together early in their careers at Bain & Company and at Release Software.

During the first year, Aspect Ventures made several Series A and seed investments funded by the co-founders' personal capital. Aspect secured $150 million for its debut fund, which included outside capital from Limited Partners, and followed it with a second fund of $181 million in early 2018. It had 116 rounds of investments in 67 companies and had 13 exists.

The founders decided to split in 2019 over clashing management styles. In the same year, both founders started new venture capital firms.

=== Owl Capital Group ===
Fonstad launched Owl Capital Group in 2019, which focused on early-stage startups.

== Board member and advisor ==
She serves on the board of the Mastercard Foundation and on the board of the Mastercard Foundation Asset Management Company (MFAM). She is a Founding Member of All-Raise, a Managing Member of Broadway Angels, and a member of the Council on Foreign Relations. Fonstad works on a volunteer basis with the Red Cross and has been selected to be the Head of Delegation for the 2024 International Federation of Red Cross and Red Crescent Societies - IFRC General Assembly.
