= Core-matrix theory of thalamus =

1998 theory of neuron classification

The core-matrix theory of thalamus, first proposed by Ted Jones in 1998, states that neurons in the thalamus belong to either a parvalbumin-immunopositive core of precisely projecting neurons, or to a calbindin-immunopositive matrix of diffusely and widely projecting neurons.

Neurons comprising the core are believed to be involved in propagation of 'driving' information, whereas neurons comprising the matrix are believed to play a more modulatory role. The cortical interactions of core neurons maintain content and enable perceptual constancy, whereas through reciprocal interactions with deep-layer cortical neurons, matrix neurons support wakefulness and determine perceptual thresholds.

== Calcium-binding protein staining in core and matrix neurons ==
Among three calcium-binding proteins, only one thalamic nucleus is immunoreactive to only a single protein. That is the centromedian nucleus, which stains only for parvalbumin. Other regions usually stain for two of the three proteins—parvalbumin, calbindin, and calretinin.

Overall, the calcium-binding proteins show a complementary staining pattern in the human thalamus. In general terms, the highest density of parvalbumin stain is in the nuclei of the ventral nuclear group (i.e. in the ventral anterior, ventral lateral and ventral posterior nuclei) and in the medial and lateral geniculate nuclear groups. Moderate amounts of parvalbumin staining are also present in regions of the medio-dorsal nucleus (MD).

By contrast, calbindin and calretinin immunoreactivity show a similar distribution of dense staining in the rostral intralaminar nuclear group and in the patchy regions of the MD thalamus, which appears to complement the pattern of parvalbumin staining. However, calbindin and calretinin also show low levels of staining in the ventral nuclear group and in the medial and lateral geniculate bodies, which overlaps with the intense parvalbumin staining in these regions.

These results show that the calcium-binding proteins are heterogeneously distributed in a complementary fashion within the nuclei of the thalamus.

The primate thalamus consists of a matrix of calbindin immunoreactive cells and a superimposed core of parvalbumin immunoreactive cells, which may have differential patterns of cortical projections.
