= Edward D. Jones =

American investment banker

Edwards David Jones Sr.
- Born: July 29, 1893; St. Louis, Missouri
- Died: October 10, 1982 (aged 89)
- Education: University of Oregon
- Occupation: Investment banker
- Known for: Oregon Tight End 1912-1914
- Children: 4, including Edward "Ted" Jr.

Edward David Jones Sr. (July 29, 1893 – October 10, 1982) was an investment banker who founded the company today known as Edward Jones Investments.

== Early life and education ==
Edward David Jones was born on July 29, 1893, in St. Louis, Missouri. His mother died in childbirth and his father, Ely, worked in Central and South America as a train engineer leaving Jones with his aunts and uncles. The family moved often and he spent his early years in Chattanooga, Tennessee, and Panama. When his father remarried, they relocated to Bellefontaine, Ohio, where he graduated from Bellefontaine High School in 1913. He graduated from New York University in 1916 with a degree in business administration.

== Career ==
He served two and a half years in the U.S. Navy during World War I, then launched his financial-services career as a bond salesman for N. W. Halsy & Company in New York City with a single building, the Woolworth Building, as his first territory.

Later, as a field representative for New York-based Blair & Co., Edward Jones moved to Ohio, then to St. Louis, where he left the company because of a dispute about his proceeds from a sale. In Ohio he was a livestock auctioneer, later using his knowledge of livestock to raise mules and cattle in Missouri.

On April 19, 1923, Jones married Ursula Griesedieck. They had four children, Ann, David, who died as a child, Martha and Edward D. "Ted" Jones. Ursula's family owned breweries including Stag Beer. Before the ratification of the 21st Amendment, repealing prohibition, Jones persuaded the family to take the company's stock public. When his father-in-law died around 1945, Jones was named president and chairman of the board of the company. He divided his days, working at Edward D. Jones & Co. in the morning and at Griesedieck in the afternoon. He sold Stag Beer's assets in 1954.

=== Edward D. Jones & Co. ===
In 1922, he founded Edward D. Jones & Co. in St. Louis as a conventional brokerage house.

In 1942, Jones paid $21,000 plus $4,000 in transfer fees for a seat on the New York Stock Exchange. In 1943, Edward D. Jones & Co. merged with Whittaker & Co., which was established in 1871 and was then the oldest brokerage firm west of the Mississippi River.

Edward D. Jones & Co. opened its first branch office in 1957, in Mexico, Missouri. Jones turned over the management of the Edward D. Jones & Co. to his son, Ted, in 1968, and reduced his own workload in 1979. However, he continued to insist on being the first person in the office every day until his death in 1982 at the age of 89. Jones' wife Ursula predeceased him by one year, dying in 1981. At the time of Jones' death, Edward D. Jones & Co. had grown to 495 branches in 33 states.
