= Penny Pennington =

American businesswoman (born 1963)

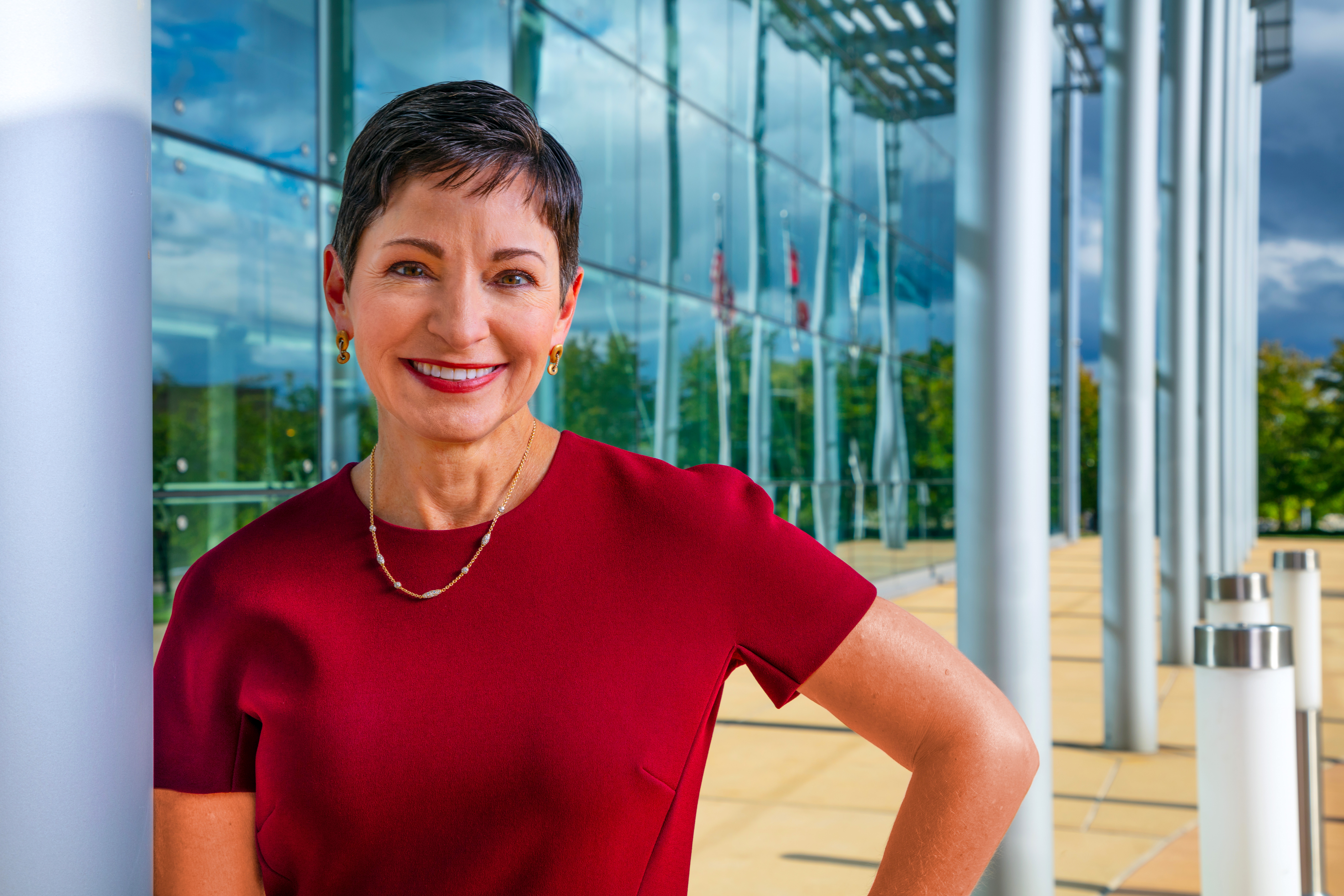
- Penny Pennington, Managing Partner, Edward Jones Investments
- Born: October 24, 1963 (age 62); Nashville, Tennessee, U.S.
- Education: University of Virginia (BA); Northwestern University (MBA)
- Occupation: Businesswoman
- Title: Managing partner of Edward Jones Investments
- Term: January 2019-present
- Spouse: Mike Fidler
- Children: 2

Penny Pennington (born October 24, 1963) is an American businesswoman serving since 2019 as the managing partner of Edward Jones Investments.

== Early life and education ==
Penny Pennington was born in Nashville, Tennessee. She earned a bachelor's degree in commerce with a concentration in finance from the University of Virginia and an MBA from Kellogg School of Management at Northwestern University.

== Career ==
Pennington started her career with Edward Jones Investments in 2000 as a financial advisor in Livonia, Michigan. She was named a principal and moved to the company's St. Louis, Missouri headquarters in 2006. After relocating to St. Louis, Pennington took on several senior leadership roles at Edward Jones. She served as a board member on the Edward Jones Trust Co. and on the executive, management and audit committees. Beginning in 2015, she was head of the client strategies group; overseeing products/services delivered to clients and research, trading and marketing.

She is a senior executive sponsor of the firm's lesbian, gay, bisexual, transgender and ally (LGBTA) Business Resource Group.

Pennington is a member of The Business Council. She was ranked 69th on Fortune's list of Most Powerful Women in 2023.

== Philanthropic efforts and board memberships ==
Pennington has served on the boards of several nonprofit and civic organizations, including the Federal Reserve Bank of St. Louis and Washington University in St. Louis. She has also been involved with organizations such as the United Way of Greater St. Louis, the Whitaker Foundation, and the Donald Danforth Plant Science Center. She is also a co-chair of the Forest Park Forever 2019 Women's Committee and 29th Annual Hat Luncheon.

== Personal life ==
Pennington is married to Mike Fidler and they have two grown children.
