= Edward Darlington Jones =

Edward Darlington Jones was a Vice Admiral in the United States Coast Guard.

== Biography ==
Edward Darlington Jones was born on May 8, 1885 in Williamsburg, Virginia. He graduated from the College of William & Mary.

In 1912, Jones married Ona Sylvia Gertrude Rogers. The couple had a daughter, Ona Janet Jones, who died as an infant in 1916.

Jones died on May 6, 1954, in Menlo Park, California and his wife died on May 3, 1959, in nearby San Francisco. They are buried together at Arlington National Cemetery.

== Career ==
Originally, Edward Darlington Jones was an officer in the United States Revenue Cutter Service. He continued to serve in the branch after it became the Coast Guard.

During World War I, Jones was Commanding Officer of multiple vessels that were engaged in convoy duty, for which he was bestowed with the Victory Medal. Afterward, he was appointed to the Order of Leopold II by King Leopold III for his aide given to a Belgian ship while he was the Commanding Officer of the USCGC Mendota.

From 1935 to 1940, Jones was the Superintendent of the United States Coast Guard Academy, eventually followed by an assignment with the United States Department of the Treasury.

Jones held various roles during World War II. Among them were being a Liaison Officer at the United States Department of the Navy and the Bureau of Navigation and Pacific Coast Coordinator of Coast Guard activities. He retired from the military in 1946.
