= Edgar Jones (Australian footballer) =

Australian rules footballer, born 1907

Personal information
- Full name: Edgar Charles Jones
- Born: 13 February 1907; Sandford, Victoria
- Died: 12 May 1970 (aged 63); Dunkeld, Victoria

Playing career^{1}
Years	Club	Games (Goals)
1928	North Melbourne	2 (0)
- ^{1} Playing statistics correct to the end of 1928.

Edgar Charles Jones (13 February 1907 – 12 May 1970) was an Australian rules footballer who played with North Melbourne in the Victorian Football League (VFL).
