= Edward Jones (football manager) =

English football manager

Personal information
- Place of birth: England

Managerial career
- Years: Team
- 1949–1952: Egypt

Edward Jones was an English football manager, who coached the Egyptian national side from 1949 to 1952. Jones was in charge of Egypt at the 1952 Summer Olympics.
