= Emersons (vocal group) =

The Emersons, originally The Demens, were a mid-20th-century American doo-wop vocal group.

The original members, Jimmy Caines (first tenor), brothers Thomas Cook (second tenor, lead) and Frankie Cook (baritone), Tommy Outlaw (bass), and Outlaw's cousin Douggy Williams (second tenor), formed in 1957 in Manhattan and began singing on street corners around 61st Street and Columbus Avenue. They became a quartet later that year when Outlaw and Williams left the group and tenor Eddie "California" Jones joined as lead singer.

The Demens issued their first single, "Take Me As I Am" / "You Broke My Heart" on Teenage Records in August 1957, followed by "The Greatest of Them All" / "Hey Young Girl". Teenage disappeared soon after that, and the group renamed themselves the Emersons in order to sign with Newport Records for "Hungry" / "Joannie, Joannie", issued in 1958. Although it was the group's most highly acclaimed record, Newport went bust after its release. (Another version of "Hungry" was recorded by Billy Guy of the Coasters in 1963.)

The Emersons kept going for a couple of years more, but disbanded after a 1961 release from United Artists went no further than any of their previous records.

== Recordings ==
- Teenage Records (The Demens)
  - 1006 "Take Me As I Am" / "You Broke My Heart" — August 1957
  - 1008 "The Greatest of Them All" / "Hey Young Girl" — 1957
- Newport Records (The Emersons)
  - 7004 "Hungry" / "Joannie, Joannie" — October 1958
- Cub Records (The Emersons)
  - 9027 "Dr. Jekyll and Mr. Hyde" / "The Hokey Pokey" — March 1959
- United Artists Records (The Emersons)
  - 379 "Down in the Valley" / "Loneliness" — November 1961
- Kairay Records (The Demons)
  - 1003 "The Greatest of Them All" (Eddie Jones & Demons) / "Long Tall Texan" (Jim Mann & Demons)
