= Edwin Jones (footballer) =

English footballer

Personal information
- Full name: Thomas Edwin Jones
- Date of birth: 1891
- Place of birth: Tyldesley, England
- Date of death: 1953 (aged 61–62)
- Place of death: Birmingham, England
- Height: 5 ft 8 1/2 in (1.74 m)
- Position: Left back

Youth career
- Tyldesley

Senior career*
Years	Team	Apps	(Gls)
1906–19??	Bolton Wanderers		
- Atherton
- Penrith
19??–1909	Chorley		
1909–1911	Exeter City	63	(2)
1911–1923	Bristol City	107	(4)
1923–????	Weymouth Town		

Managerial career
- 1923–19??: Bristol Rovers trainer
- Bristol City trainer
- 1926–1929: Exeter City trainer
- 1938–19??: Torquay United trainer
- * Club domestic league appearances and goals

Thomas Edwin Jones (1891–1953) was an English professional association football player in the years both prior to and after the First World War. He made over 100 appearances in The Football League for Bristol City. He also played over 60 times in the Southern League for Exeter City.

== Football career ==
Jones was born in Tyldesley in 1891 where he played for the local clubs Tyldesley, Atherton and Chorley. A talented rugby League wing as a youth, both Wigan and Wakefield Trinity showed an interest in signing him. Jones signed for Bolton Wanderers but does not appear as a player for them. While at Bolton Wanderers, Jones continued to play for Penrith and then Chorley in the Lancashire Combination.

In July 1909 Jones joined Exeter City from Chorley making his Southern League debut at right-back in a 1–2 defeat at Croydon Common on 4 September 1909. Jones made 39 appearances mostly at left-back in 1909–10 as Exeter City finished 18th in the Southern League First Division. He made a further 24 appearances scoring two goals, both penalties, for Exeter City in 1910–11 before Harry Thickett signed Jones for Bristol City in February 1911. He made his debut at left back in the 1–1 draw against Liverpool on 18 February 1911 shortly after Joe Cottle had suffered a broken leg. Jones made three appearances in the First Division in 1910–11 the season that the "Robins" were relegated to the Second Division. He joined Weymouth Town in 1923.

== Coaching career ==
After retiring from playing, "Ted" Jones joined Bristol Rovers as trainer on 21 July 1923, later training both Bristol City and from July 1938 Torquay United. Jones returned to Exeter City in 1926 and spent three seasons as trainer. He died in Birmingham in 1953.
