= Edward D. "Ted" Jones =

American businessman (1925–1990)

Edward D. "Ted" Jones, former CEO, Edward Jones Investments

Edward David "Ted" Jones Jr. (December 18, 1925 – October 3, 1990), the son of the founder of Edward Jones Investments, later ran the firm and built its signature small town brokerage system. He devoted his last years along with his wife Pat Jones to establishing the Katy Trail State Park and the Prairie Fork Conservation Area in Missouri.

== Early life and education ==
Jones was born in St. Louis, Missouri and spent much of his youth on his family's farm in Williamsburg, Missouri. Following graduation from the Taylor School in 1943, Jones enlisted in the Merchant Marines during World War II, then served in the United States Army in 1946 before returning to the University of Missouri in 1947 to study agriculture.

After one year of study, Jones was sent to New York City where he worked as a page on the floor of the New York Stock Exchange. He later worked at Josephthal & Co., an organization that served as Edward D. Jones & Co.’s New York correspondent. He returned to St. Louis in 1948 to work for his father Edward D. Jones.

In 1968, Ted succeeded his father to become Edward Jones Investments’ second managing partner until 1980. During his tenure, the firm expanded to over 300 branch offices.

== Philosophy ==
While conducting business in rural Missouri and Illinois, Jones proposed that the company begin opening offices outside of St. Louis. He subsequently instituted the firm's branch office business model and oversaw the opening of the first one-person branch office in Mexico, Missouri. Jones’ expansion philosophy focused on towns of 20,000 to 35,000 people, many of which did not have access to personal brokers selling mutual funds, unit trusts and tax-free bonds.

Differing from other firms that went public, Jones kept the company a privately owned partnership, only allowing employees to purchase shares in the company instead of opening stock purchases to the general public.

== Personal life ==
In the last 10 years of his life, he donated $2.2 million for Missouri to acquire property along 200 miles of abandoned Missouri–Kansas–Texas Railroad rail tracks to form a bicycle path for the Katy Trail State Park. The eastern terminus of the park is the confluence of the Missouri River and Mississippi River. In 2004 the park at the confluence was named Edward "Ted" and Pat Jones-Confluence Point State Park in honor of Jones and his wife.

In 2015 Edward "Ted" Jones Jr. was inducted into the "Hall of Famous Missourians" during a ceremony at the state capitol.
