= Edward G. Jones =

American neuroscientist (1939–2011)

External image
- Edward G. Jones

Edward (Ted) G. Jones (March 26, 1939, in Upper Hutt, New Zealand – June 6, 2011, in Davis, California) was an American neuroscientist and a prolific neuroanatomist.

One of his main contributions involves his Core-Matrix theory of thalamic organization. He authored a highly influential book entitled The Thalamus in 1985. Jones resided in California and served as director for the Center for Neuroscience at the University of California, Davis.

He was a former president of the Society for Neuroscience.
