= Edward Jones Investments =

American financial services firm

Edward D. Jones & Co., L.P.
- Trade name: Edward Jones Investments
- Type: Private
- Industry: Investment services
- Founded: 1922; 104 years ago
- Founder: Edward D. Jones
- Headquarters: Des Peres, Missouri, United States
- Number of locations: 15,000 branches (2025)
- Key people: Penny Pennington (Managing Partner)
- Products: Investment services Wealth management Financial planning
- Revenue: ▲US$16.3 billion (2024)
- Net income: ▲US$1.98 billion (2024)
- AUM: ▲US$2.2 trillion (Q2 2024)
- Number of employees: 55,000 (2025)
- Parent: The Jones Financial Companies
- Website: www.edwardjones.com

Edward D. Jones & Co., L.P. (d.b.a Edward Jones Investments), commonly referred to as Edward Jones, is an American financial services firm headquartered in the St. Louis, Missouri, area. Founded in 1922 by Edward D. Jones Sr., the firm operates a large network of branch offices in the United States and Canada, primarily serving individual investors and small businesses.

Edward Jones introduced the branch-office brokerage model in the United States and is a member of the Securities Investor Protection Corporation (SIPC). As of 2025, the firm employed about 55,000 people, reported revenue of $16.3 billion, and managed client assets of approximately $2.2 trillion. Edward Jones ranks #260 on the Fortune 500 list, which ranks the largest U.S. companies by revenue.

The company employs more than 20,000 financial advisors across North America. In addition to its advisory business, Edward Jones also operates a venture arm that invests in early-stage companies.

== Background ==
Edward Jones serves investment clients in the U.S. and Canada, through its branch network of more than 15,000 locations and 19,000 financial advisors. The company currently has relationships with nearly 9 million clients and $2.2 trillion in assets under management worldwide. The firm focuses solely on individual investors and business owners.

The company is a subsidiary of The Jones Financial Companies, L.L.L.P., a limited liability limited partnership owned only by its employees and retired employees and is not publicly traded. Edward Jones appointed Penny Pennington as managing partner, effective January 2019, making her the firm's sixth managing partner and the only woman to lead a major U.S. brokerage firm.

== History ==
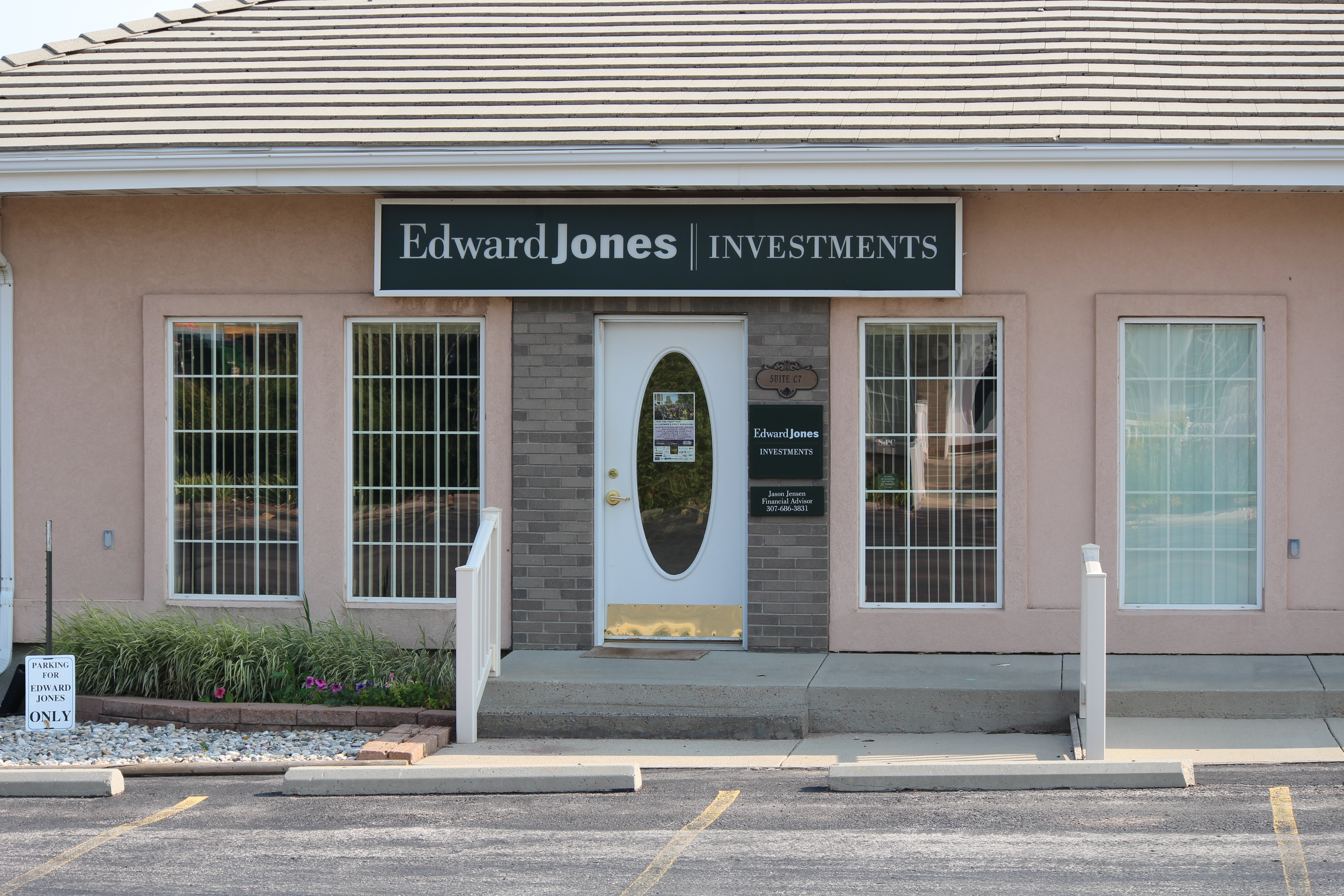
An Edward Jones Investments in Gillette, Wyoming

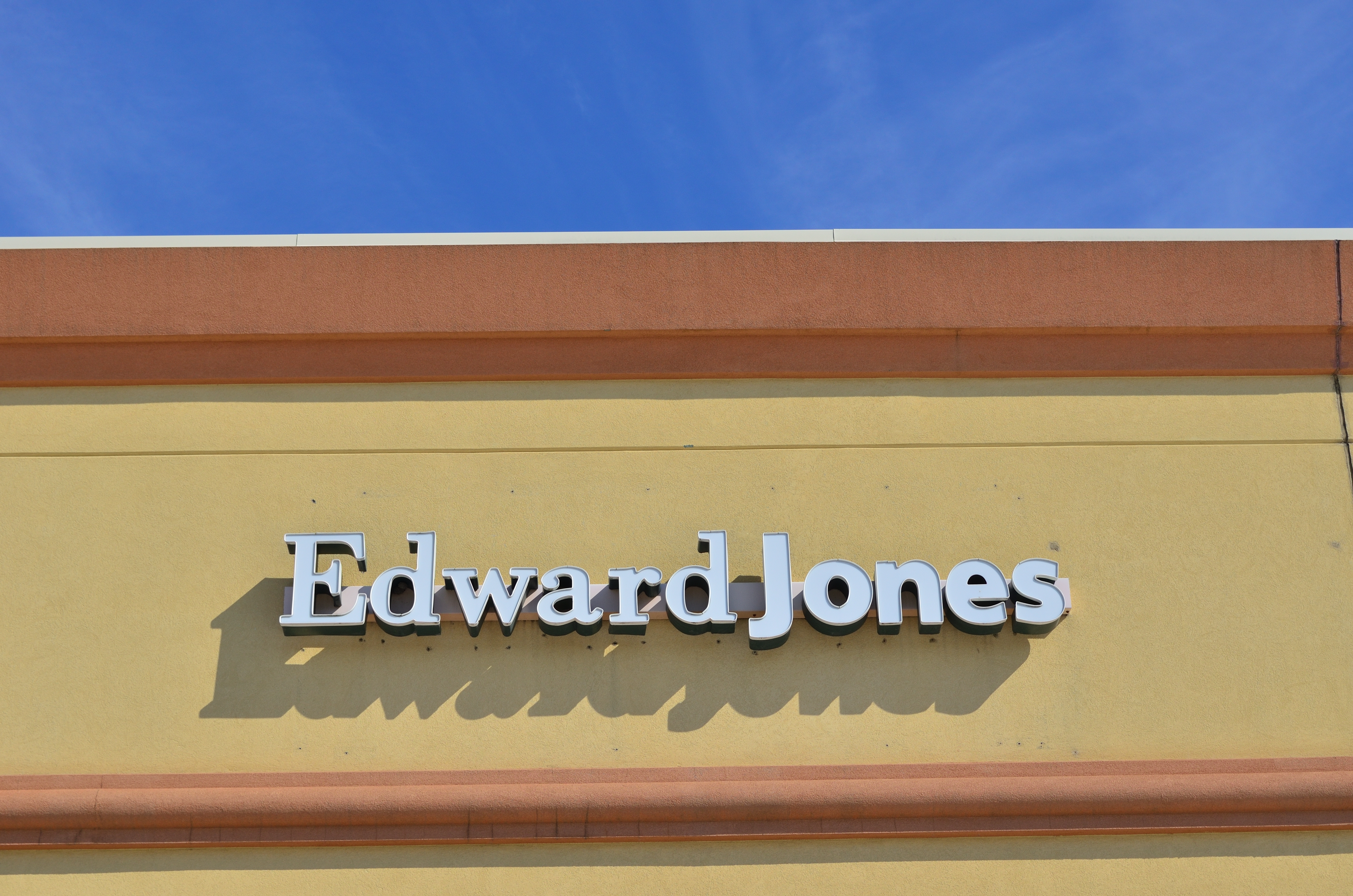
Edward Jones in Markham, Ontario

=== Founding and early years (1922–1960s) ===
Edward Jones was founded by Edward D. Jones in St. Louis, Missouri in 1922. (A different Edward D. Jones was a co-founder of Dow Jones.) Edward Jones' son Edward D. "Ted" Jones was responsible for the creation of the individual branch network, which has spread across rural communities, suburbs and metro cities throughout the US and Canada. The first single broker office was opened by Ted, and staffed by Zeke McIntyre, in Mexico, Missouri. Ted opened another branch office in Pueblo, Colorado, with his brother-in-law Bill Lloyd as manager of the multi-broker office. When Edward D. Jones Sr., found the teletypewriter line bill, he insisted Ted either shut the office down, or find some way to pay for it. Ted Jones paid for it by opening one-broker offices on either side of the teletypewriter line, stretching from St. Louis, Missouri, to Pueblo, Colorado. That is why some of the earliest Edward Jones offices were Dodge City, Hays, Great Bend, Manhattan in Kansas, and Jefferson City in Missouri. Small town branch operations took "Wall Street to Main Street" and created a high volume of sales for the company and its brokers. About 10% of its business in the 1960s was in commodity trading due to many clients being cattle farmers.

=== Expansion and branding (1970s–2000s) ===
Edward Jones Investments had the naming rights for the Edward Jones Dome in Saint Louis, Missouri. After the St. Louis Rams decided to move to Los Angeles, Edward Jones Investments exercised its right to terminate its sponsorship, and the facility is now known as The Dome at America's Center.

=== Regulatory actions (2000s–2010s) ===
On December 22, 2004, the Securities and Exchange Commission, NASD and the New York Stock Exchange settled enforcement proceedings against Edward Jones, related to allegations that Edward Jones failed to adequately disclose revenue sharing payments that it received from a select group of mutual fund families that Edward Jones recommended to its customers. The company paid a $75 million fine and disclosed the revenue sharing payments on its website.

On August 13, 2015, the Securities and Exchange Commission required Edward Jones to pay a $20 million fine for overcharging retail customers.

=== Political contributions and organizational developments (2018–2022) ===
The Edward Jones PAC made two contributions to Senator Josh Hawley since he was elected in November 2018 – a $2,500 contribution to a luncheon in April 2019 and a $1,000 contribution to a virtual event in 2020. In January 2021 Edward Jones paused all contributions to elected officials and political organizations.

The company had 18,796 advisors on staff at the end of 2022.

=== 2023–present ===
In late 2023, It piloted a program in which certain clients could receive financial plans prepared by home-office wealth strategists, and the firm introduced the MoneyGuide financial-planning platform across its branch network. During the same period the company expanded its separately managed account (SMA) offerings, adding new home-office-managed SMA options and additional third-party managed allocations; the firm said it planned to increase the total number of SMA options to more than 300 by 2025.

In April 2025, The Jones Financial Companies submitted applications to the Federal Deposit Insurance Corporation (FDIC) and the Utah Department of Financial Institutions for an industrial-bank (Edward Jones Bank), an application described by the firm as part of its effort to expand banking services to clients; the application was pending regulatory review. In parallel, Edward Jones announced an expanded partnership with U.S. Bank to provide co-branded checking accounts and credit-card services to U.S. people, with availability announced for late 2025.

Also in early 2025, the firm announced Edward Jones Ventures, an internal venture investing capability intended to invest in financial-technology and related businesses; early portfolio companies reported in the press included Porch Software and Waterlily.

In the second quarter of 2025, the firm also introduced a private-client service, Edward Jones Generations, targeted at investors with substantial investable assets, and it began piloting arrangements that allowed financial advisors to share client relationships rather than operate under the firm’s historical single-advisor office model. Where statements describe company plans or pilots, they are presented as company announcements or reported plans.

== Business model ==
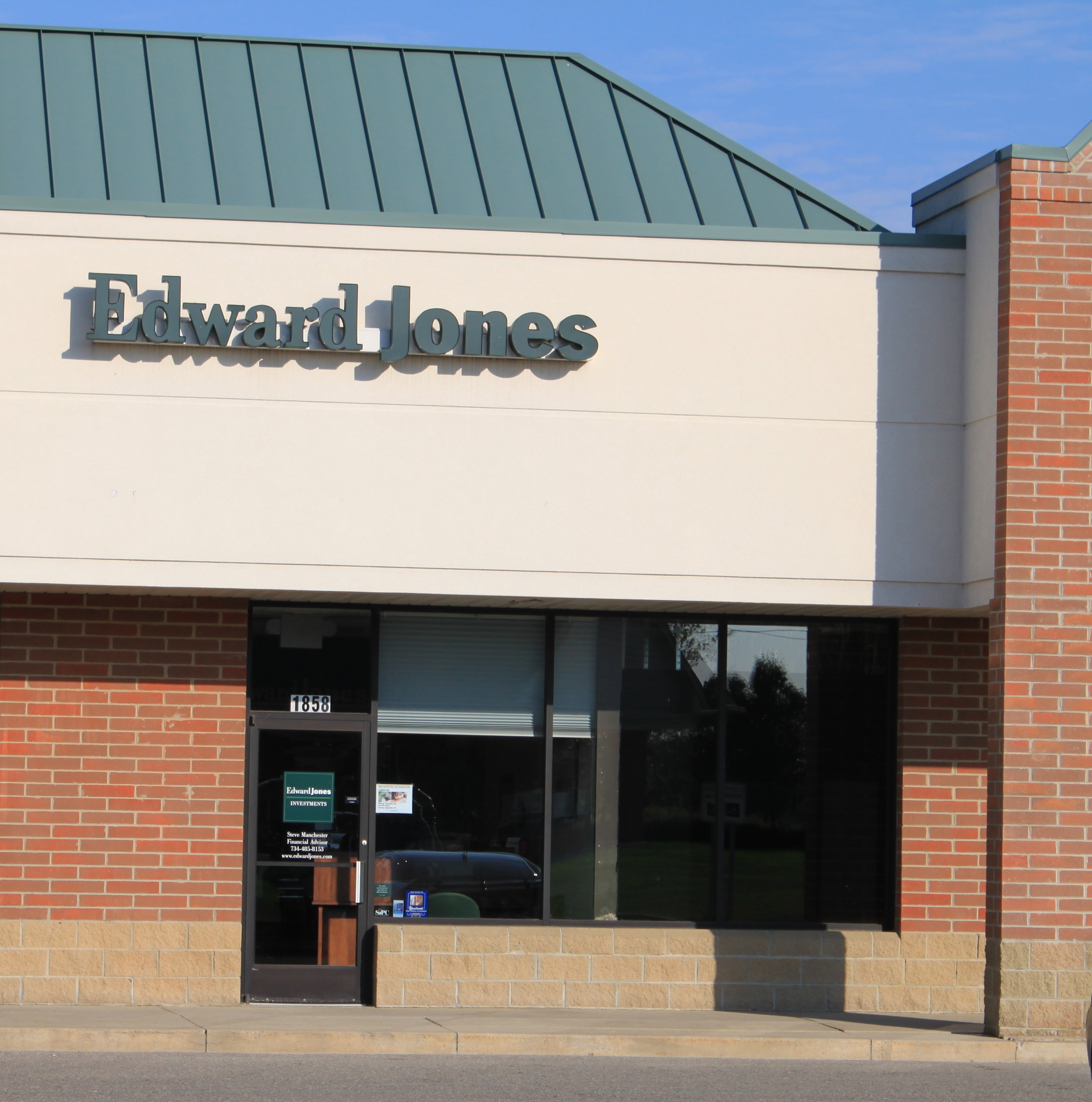
Edward Jones branch office in Ypsilanti Township, Michigan

Edward Jones financial advisors offer commission-based and fee-based financial products. Offices are usually staffed by a financial advisor (licensed broker) and one branch office administrator. The branch office administrator acts as an assistant to the financial advisor, filling the roles of a secretary, manager, and co-worker.

The one-broker-per-office model allows clients to choose their broker directly, and deal with that person exclusively. Edward Jones has 18,892 brokers on staff and more than 15,000 branch offices across the United States. In 2022, the company launched a teaming program that allowed multiple branches to service clients. Prior to its introduction, clients were directed to a single branch office.

In 2025, the company announced Edward Jones Generations, a private-client service for investors with $10 million or more in assets, which includes expanded planning, investment management, and access to select alternative investments.

== Corporate affairs ==
The company has its corporate headquarters in Des Peres, Missouri, part of St. Louis County, Missouri. Its South Campus is located at located at Ballas Road and Manchester Road. The Edward Jones North Campus is located on a zoned plot southeast of the intersection of Interstate 270 and Dorsett Road in the City of Maryland Heights in St. Louis County.

Edward Jones has locations in the United States and Canada. The company had offices in the United Kingdom for 10 years, before selling the division to British brokerage firm Towry Law in 2009.

== Controversy ==
Edward Jones was the subject of a successful anti-discrimination suit from its minority stock brokers. There was an allegation that Edward Jones did not allow minority brokers equal access to support programs and lucrative territories. The company settled the lawsuit in 2021 for 34 million dollars.

== Awards and rankings ==
In 2020, Fortune, in partnership with Great Place to Work, ranked Edward Jones seventh on its list of the 100 Best Companies to Work For, based on employee survey data. The firm was ranked twentieth on the same list in 2021. Edward Jones was ranked 303rd on the Fortune 500 list in 2024, based on 2023 revenue of more than $14 billion, and rose to 260th place in 2025, based on 2024 revenue of approximately $16.3 billion.

In 2025, the firm ranked fourth in the Securities and Asset Management category on Fortune’s World’s Most Admired Companies list. In the same year, the J.D. Power U.S. Investor Satisfaction Study ranked Edward Jones third among advised investors. Training magazine placed the firm seventeenth in its 2025 Training APEX Awards rankings,. Also in 2025, the Human Rights Campaign’s Corporate Equality Index awarded Edward Jones a score of 100 out of 100, designating it an Equality 100 company. That year, the firm was additionally included in Fortune magazine’s list of America’s Most Innovative Companies.

In March 2026, Edward Jones was ranked among the top firms in the advised-client category of the J.D. Power U.S. Investor Satisfaction Study.

== Sponsorship ==
In September 2026, Edward Jones was announced as the official private wealth management partner of McLaren Racing in a multi-year deal, supporting the McLaren Formula One and IndyCar teams.
