= Great Replacement conspiracy theory =

Conspiracy theory about race and culture

The Great Replacement (French: grand remplacement), also known as replacement theory or great replacement theory, is a debunked white nationalist far-right conspiracy theory coined by French author Renaud Camus. Camus's theory states that, with the complicity or cooperation of "replacist" elites, (Note: French: pouvoir/élite remplaciste) the ethnic French and white European populations are deliberately being replaced by non-white peoples—especially from Muslim-majority countries—through mass migration, demographic growth, and a drop in the birth rate of white Europeans. Similar claims have been advanced in other national contexts, notably in the United States. A consensus of academic scholars have dismissed these claims of a conspiracy of "replacist" elites as rooted in a misunderstanding of demographic statistics and premised upon an unscientific, racist worldview.

While similar themes have characterized various far-right theories since the late 19th century, the particular term was popularized by Camus in his 2011 book Le Grand Remplacement. The book associates the presence of Muslims in France with danger and destruction of French culture and civilization. Camus and other conspiracy theorists attribute recent demographic changes in Europe to intentional policies advanced by global and liberal elites (the "replacists") from within the Government of France, the European Union, or the United Nations; they describe it as a "genocide by substitution".

The conspiracy theory found support in Europe, and has also grown popular among anti-migrant and white nationalist movements from other parts of the West; many of their adherents maintain that "immigrants [are] flocking to predominantly white countries for the precise purpose of rendering the white population a minority within their own land or even causing the extinction of the native population". It aligns with (and is a part of) the larger white genocide conspiracy theory (Note: Rife in Western far-right movements since the late 20th century, notably through the efforts of American neo-Nazi activist David Lane.) except in the substitution of antisemitic tropes with Islamophobia. This substitution, along with a use of simple catch-all slogans, has been cited as one of the reasons for its broader appeal in a pan-European context, although the concept remains rooted in antisemitism in many white nationalist movements, especially (but not exclusively) in the United States.

Although Camus has publicly condemned white nationalist violence, scholars have argued that calls to violence are implicit in his depiction of non-white migrants as an existential threat to white populations. Several far-right terrorists, including the perpetrators of the 2019 Christchurch mosque shootings, the 2019 El Paso shooting, and the 2022 Buffalo shooting, have made reference to the "Great Replacement" conspiracy theory. American conservative media personalities, including Tucker Carlson and Laura Ingraham, have espoused ideas of a replacement.

== Background ==
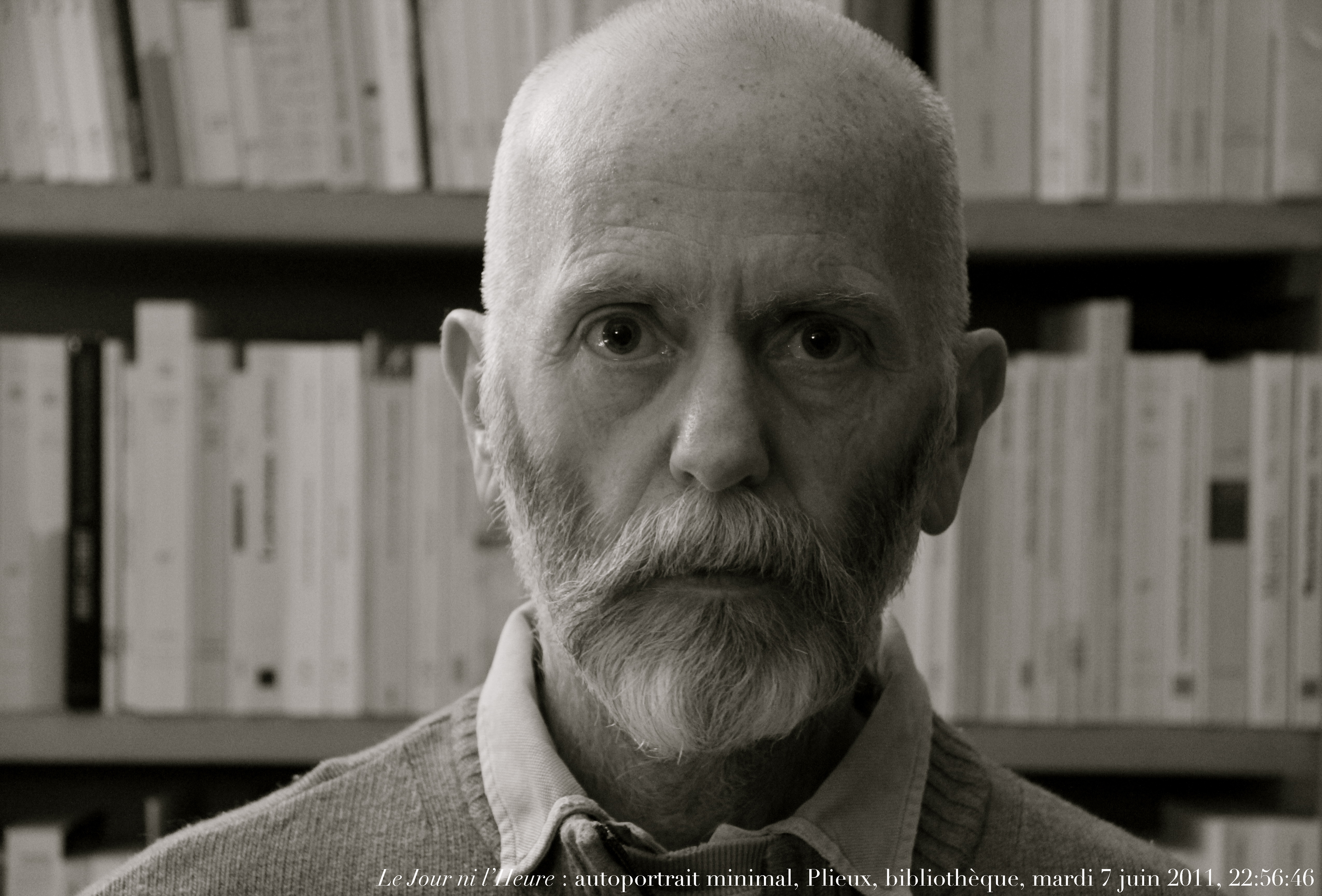
Camus in 2011

Renaud Camus developed his conspiracy theory in two books published in 2010 and 2011, in the context of an increase in anti-immigrant rhetoric in public discourse during the previous decade. Europe also experienced an escalation in Islamic terrorist attacks during the 2000s–2010s, and a migrant crisis in the years 2015–2016, which exacerbated tensions and prepared public opinion for the reception of Camus's conspiracy theory. As the latter depicts a population replacement said to occur in a short time lapse of one or two generations, the migrant crisis was particularly conducive to the spread of Camus's ideas while the terrorist attacks accelerated the construction of immigrants as an existential threat among those who shared such a worldview.

Camus's theme of a future demise of European culture and civilization also parallels a "cultural pessimistic" and anti-Islam trend among European intellectuals of the period, illustrated in several best-selling and straightforwardly titled books released during the 2010s: Thilo Sarrazin's Germany Abolishes Itself (2010), Éric Zemmour's The French Suicide (2014) or Michel Houellebecq's Submission (2015).

== Concept of Renaud Camus ==
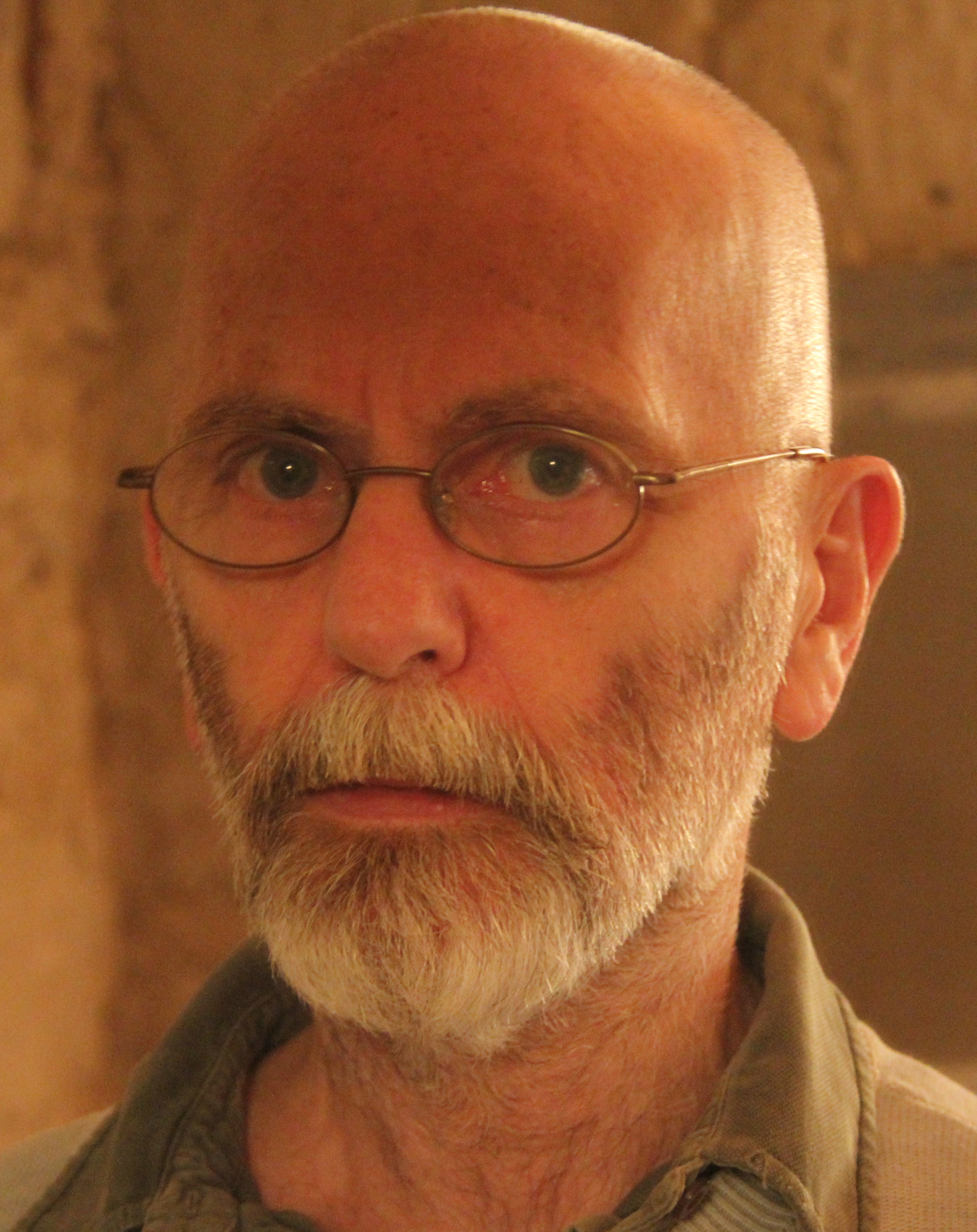
Author Renaud Camus, progenitor of the "Great Replacement" conspiracy theory, September 2013

The "Great Replacement" conspiracy theory was developed by French author Renaud Camus, initially in a 2010 book titled L'Abécédaire de l'in-nocence ("Abecedarium of no-harm"), (Note: In-nocence is a wordplay built on the archaic term nocence, originally meaning 'harm, nuisance, malice, guilt', and from which the modern French and English "innocence" derive.) and the following year in an eponymous book, Le Grand Remplacement (introduction au remplacisme global). (Note: English: The Great Replacement (introduction to global replacism)) Camus has claimed that the name Grand Remplacement "came to [him], almost by chance, perhaps in a more or less unconscious reference to the Grand Dérangement of the Acadians in the 18th century." As an epigraph to the later book, Camus chose Bertolt Brecht's quip from the satirical poem Die Lösung that the easiest thing to do for a government which had lost the confidence of its people would be to choose new people.

According to Camus, the "Great Replacement" has been nourished by "industrialisation", "despiritualisation" and "deculturation"; (Note: The French term déculturation can be translated as 'loss', 'disappearance' or 'erasure' of one's culture or national feeling.) the materialistic society and globalism having created a "replaceable human, without any national, ethnic, or cultural specificity", what he labels "global replacism". Camus claims that "the great replacement does not need a definition," as the term is not, in his views, a "concept" but rather a "phenomenon".

In Camus's theory, the indigenous French people ("the replaced") (Note: French: les remplacés) is described as being demographically replaced by non-white populations ("the replacing [peoples]") (Note: French: les remplaçants)—mainly coming from Africa or the Middle East—in a process of "peopling immigration" encouraged by a "replacist power".

Camus frequently uses terms and concepts related to the period of Nazi-occupied France (1940–1945). He for instance labels "colonizers" or "Occupiers" (Note: French: colonisateurs/colonisation and Occupants) people of non-European descent who reside in Europe, and dismisses what he calls the "replacist elites" as "collaborationist". In 2017 Camus founded an organization named the National Council of European Resistance, in a self-evident reference to the World War II National Council of the Resistance (1943–1945). This analogy to the French Resistance against Nazism has been described as an implicit call to hatred, direct action or even violence against what Camus labels the "Occupiers; i.e. the immigrants". Camus has also compared the Great Replacement and the so-called "genocide by substitution" of the European peoples to the Holocaust.

=== Claimed influences ===
Camus cites two influential figures in the epilogue of his 2011 book The Great Replacement: British politician Enoch Powell's apocalyptic vision of future race relations—expressed in his 1968 "Rivers of Blood" speech—and French author Jean Raspail's depiction of the collapse of the West from an overwhelming "tidal wave" of Third World immigration, featured in his 1973 novel The Camp of the Saints.

Camus also declared to The Spectator magazine in 2016 that a key to understanding the "Great Replacement" can be found in his 2002 book Du Sens. In the latter he wrote that the words "France" and "French" equal a natural and physical reality rather than a legal one, in a cratylism similar to Charles Maurras's distinction between the "legal" and the "real country". (Note: French: pays légal and pays réel) During the same interview, Camus mentioned that he began to imagine his conspiracy theory back in 1996, while editing a guidebook on the department of Hérault, in the South of France: "I suddenly realized that in very old villages [...] the population had totally changed too [...] this is when I began to write like that."

== Similar themes ==
=== White genocide conspiracy theory ===
Despite its own singularities and concepts, the "Great Replacement" is encompassed in a larger and older "white genocide" conspiracy theory, popularized in the US by neo-Nazi David Lane in his 1995 White Genocide Manifesto, where he asserted that governments in Western countries were intending to turn white people into "extinct species". Scholars generally agree that, although he did not father the theme, Camus indeed coined the term "Great Replacement" as a slogan and concept, and eventually led it to its fame in the 2010s.

The idea of "replacement" under the guidance of a hostile elite can be further traced back to pre-WWII antisemitic conspiracy theories which posited the existence of a Jewish plot to destroy Europe through miscegenation, especially in Édouard Drumont's antisemitic bestseller La France juive (1886). Commenting on this resemblance, historian Nicolas Lebourg and political scientist Jean-Yves Camus suggest that Renaud Camus's contribution was to replace the antisemitic elements with a clash of civilizations between Muslims and Europeans.

Also in the late 19th century, imperialist politicians invoked the Péril jaune (Yellow Peril) in their negative comparisons of France's low birth-rate and the high birth-rates of Asian countries. From that claim arose an artificial, cultural fear that immigrant-worker Asians soon would "flood" France. This danger supposedly could be successfully countered only by increased fecundity of French women. Then, France would possess enough soldiers to thwart the eventual flood of immigrants from Asia. Maurice Barrès's nationalist writings of that period have also been noted in the ideological genealogy of the "Great Replacement", Barrès contending both in 1889 and in 1900 that a replacement of the native population under the combined effect of immigration and a decline in the birth rate was happening in France.

Scholars also highlight a modern similarity to European neo-fascist and neo-Nazi thinkers from the immediate post-war, especially Maurice Bardèche, René Binet and Gaston-Armand Amaudruz, and to concepts advanced from the 1960s onward by the French Nouvelle Droite.

The associated and more recent conspiracy theory of "Eurabia", formulated by British author Bat Ye'or in her 2005 book Eurabia: The Euro‐Arab Axis, is often cited as a probable inspiration for Camus's "Great Replacement" theory. The Eurabia theory likewise involves supposed "globalist" entities that are led by both French and Arab powers, conspiring to bring about the Arabization and Islamization of Europe, with Arabs and Muslims submerging the continent through immigration and higher birth rates. Eurabia depicts immigrants as invaders or as a fifth column, invited to the continent by a corrupt political elite.

== Analysis ==
=== Refutation ===
While the ethnic demography of France has shifted as a result of post-WWII immigration, scholars have generally dismissed the claims of a "great replacement" as being rooted in an exaggeration of immigration statistics and unscientific, racially prejudiced views. Geographer Landis MacKellar criticized Camus's thesis for assuming "that third- and fourth- generation 'immigrants' are somehow not French."

=== Racial connotations ===
In the words of scholar Andrew Fergus Wilson, whereas the islamophobic Great Replacement theory can be distinguished from the parallel antisemitic white genocide conspiracy theory, "they share the same terms of reference and both are ideologically aligned with the so-called '14 words' of David Lane ["We must secure the existence of our people and a future for white children"]." In 2021, the Anti-Defamation League wrote that "since many white supremacists, particularly those in the United States, blame Jews for non-white immigration to the U.S.", the Great Replacement theory has been increasingly associated with antisemitism and conflated with the white genocide conspiracy theory. Scholar Kathleen Belew has argued that the Great Replacement theory "allows an opportunism in selecting enemies", but "also follows the central motivating logic, which is to protect the thing on the inside [i.e. the preservation and birth rate of the white race], regardless of the enemy on the outside."

According to Australian historian A. Dirk Moses, the great replacement theory is a form of psychological projection in which Europeans—who enacted settler-colonial projects entailing the elimination and replacement of native populations by settler societies—fear the reverse may happen to them.

In German discourse, Austrian political scientist Rainer Bauböck questioned the conspiracy theorists' use of the terms "population replacement" or "exchange" (Bevölkerungsaustausch). Using Ruth Wodak's analysis that the slogan needs to be viewed in its historical context, Bauböck has concluded that the conspiracy theory is a reemergence of the Nazi ideology of Umvolkung ("ethnicity inversion").

=== Popularity ===
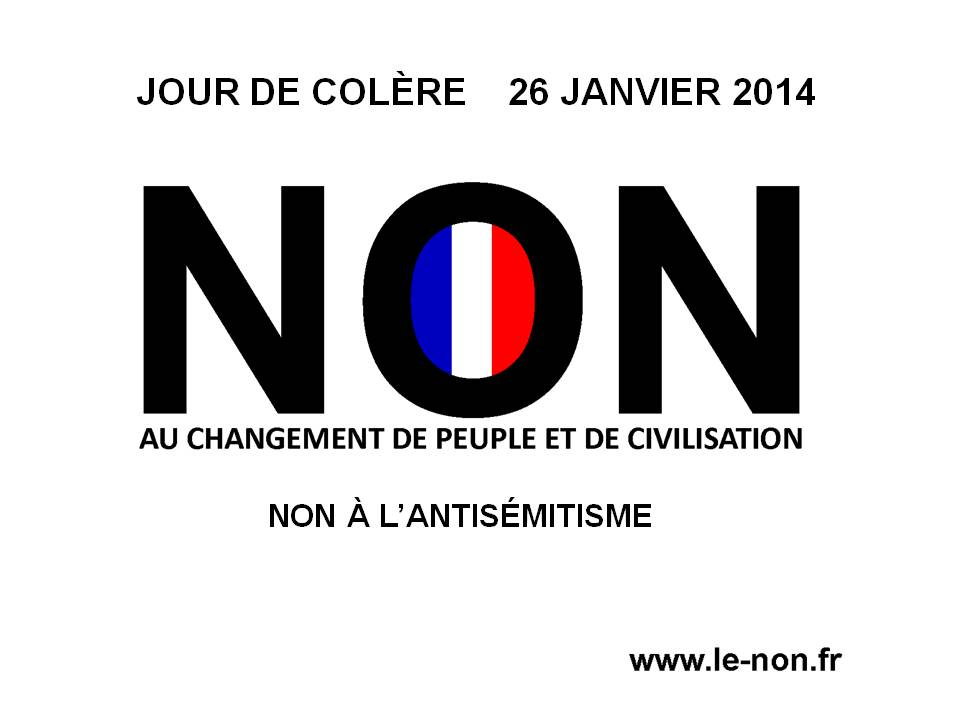
Camus's tract for his 2014 "day of anger" demonstration against the "great replacement": "No to the change of people and of civilization, no to antisemitism"

The simplicity and use of catch-all slogans in Camus's formulations—"you have one people, and in the space of a generation you have a different people"—as well as his removal of antisemitism from the original neo-Nazi "white genocide" conspiracy theory, have been cited as conducive to the popularity of the "Great Replacement" in Europe.

In a survey led by Ifop in December 2018, 25% of the French subscribed to the conspiracy theory; as well as 46% of the responders who defined themselves as "Gilets Jaunes" (Yellow Vest protesters). In another survey led by Harris Interactive in October 2021, 61% of the French believed that the "Great Replacement" will happen in France; 67% of the respondents were worried about it.

The theory has also become influential in far-right and white nationalist circles outside of France. The conspiracy theory has been cited by Canadian far-right political activist Lauren Southern in a YouTube video of the same name released in July 2017. Southern's video had attracted in 2020 more than 686,000 views and is credited with helping to popularize the conspiracy theory. Counter-jihad Norwegian blogger Fjordman has also participated in spreading the theory. It has also been promoted by the German edition of The Epoch Times, a far-right Falun Gong–associated newspaper.

Prominent right-wing extremist websites such as Gates of Vienna, Politically Incorrect, and Fdesouche have provided a platform for bloggers to diffuse and popularize the theory of the "Great Replacement". Among its main promoters are also a wide-ranging network of loosely connected white nationalist movements, especially the Identitarian movement in Europe, and other groups like PEGIDA in Germany.

== Political influence ==
=== Europe ===
==== France ====
Much of the European spread of the Great Replacement (French: Grand Remplacement) conspiracy theory rhetoric is due to its prevalence in French national discourse and media. Nationalist right-wing groups in France have asserted that there is an ongoing "Islamo-substitution" of the indigenous French population, associating the presence of Muslims in France with potential danger and destruction of French culture and civilization.

In 2011, Marine Le Pen evoked the theory, claiming that France's "adversaries" were waging a moral and economic war on the country, apparently "to deliver it to submersion by an organized replacement of our population". In 2013, historian Dominique Venner's suicide in Notre-Dame de Paris, in which he left a note outlining the "crime of the replacement of our people" is reported to have inspired the far-right Iliade Institute's main ideological tenet of the Great Replacement. Referring to the conspiracy theory, Marine Le Pen publicly praised Venner, claiming that his "last gesture, eminently political, was to try to awaken the French people".

In 2015, Guillaume Faye gave a speech at the Swedish Army Museum in Stockholm, in which he claimed there were three societal things being used against Europeans to carry out a supposed Great Replacement: abortion, homosexuality and immigration. He asserted that Muslims were replacing white people by using birthrates as a demographic weapon.

In June 2017, a BuzzFeed News investigation revealed three National Front candidates subscribing to the conspiracy theory ahead of the legislative elections. These included Senator Stéphane Ravier's personal assistant, who claimed the Great Replacement had already started in France. Publishing an image of blonde girl next to the caption "Say no to white genocide", Ravier's aide politically charged the concept further, writing "the National Front or the invasion".

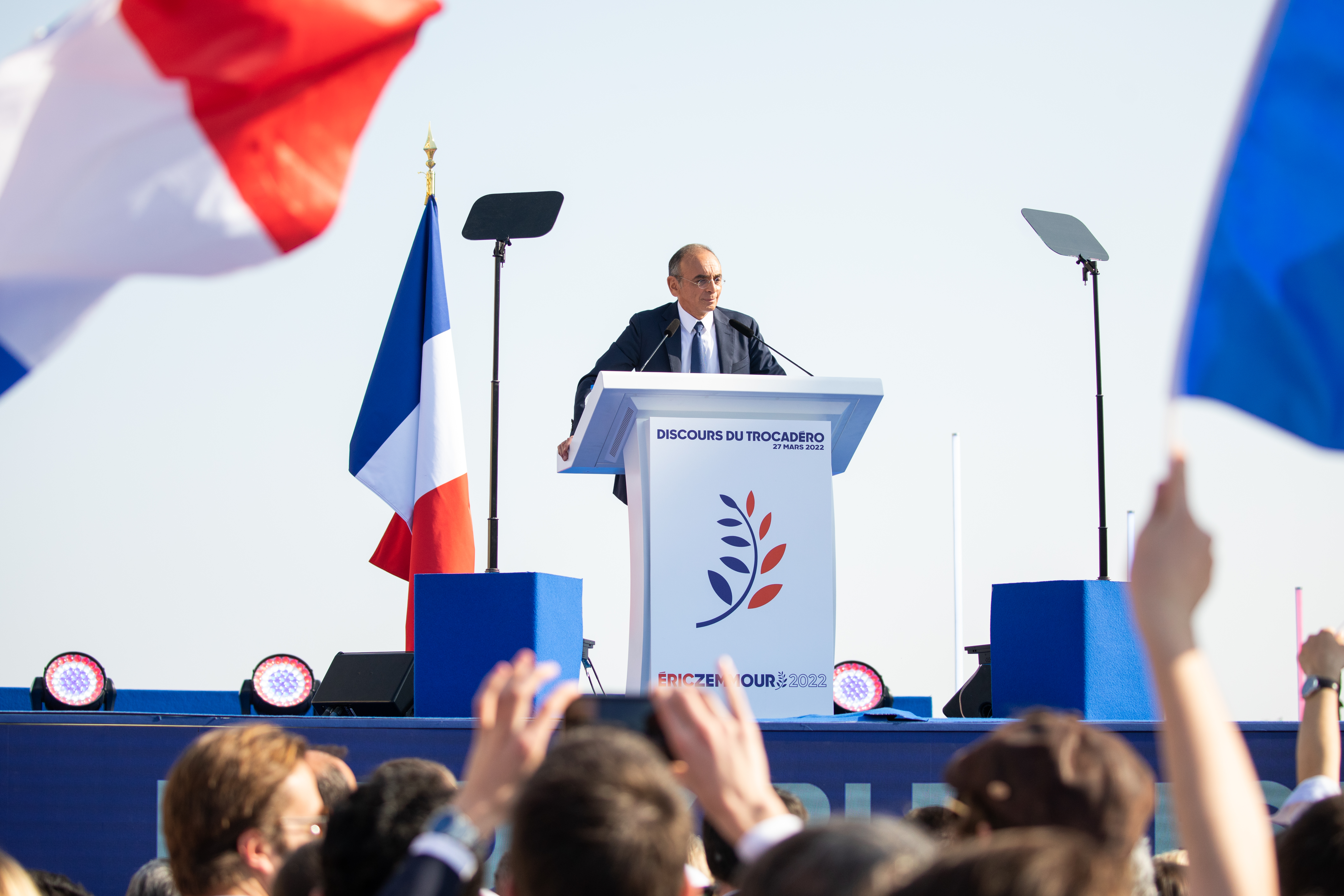
Journalist and author Éric Zemmour, who ran for President of France in the 2022 election, promoted extensively the Great Replacement concept.

By September 2018, in a meeting at Fréjus, Marine Le Pen closely echoed Great Replacement rhetoric. Speaking of France, she declared that "never in the history of mankind, have we seen a society that organizes an irreversible submersion" that would eventually cause French society to "disappear by dilution or substitution, its culture and way of life". Following the Christchurch mosque shootings, Le Pen falsely denied knowledge of the theory.

Former National Assembly delegate Marion Maréchal, who is a junior member of the political Le Pen family, is also a proponent of the theory. In March 2019, in a trip to the US, Maréchal evoked the theory, stating "I don't want France to become a land of Islam". Insisting that the Great Replacement was "not absurd", she declared the "indigenous French" people, apparently in danger of being a minority by 2040, now wanted their "country back".

National Rally's serving president Marine Le Pen, who is the aunt of Maréchal, has been heavily influenced by the Great Replacement. The Frankfurter Allgemeine Zeitung has described the conspiracy theory creator Renaud Camus as Le Pen's "whisperer". In May 2019, National Rally spokesman Jordan Bardella was reported to use the conspiracy theory during a televised debate with Nathalie Loiseau, after he argued that France must "turn off the tap" from the demographic bomb of African immigration into the country.

In June 2019, journalist and author Éric Zemmour pushed the concept in comparison to the Kosovo War, claiming "In 1900, there were 90% Serbs and 10% Muslims in Kosovo, in 1990 there were 90% Muslims and 10% Serbs, then there was war and the independence of Kosovo". Zemmour, author of The French Suicide, has repeatedly described "the progressive replacement, over a few decades, of the historic population of our country by immigrants, the vast majority of them non-European". Later that month, Marion Maréchal joined Zemmour in invoking the Great Replacement in relation to the Balkan region, stating "I do not want my France to become Kosovo" and declared that the changing demographics of France "threatens us" ("nous menace") and that this was increasingly clear. Zemmour ran for president in 2022 and continued to extensively promote the theory during his campaign. He finished in fourth place in the first round of the election, taking 7,07% of the vote.

==== Austria ====
Identitäre Bewegung Österreich (IBÖ), the Austrian branch of the Identitarian movement, promotes this theory, citing a "great exchange" (Note: German: (Der) Große Austausch) or replacement of the population that supposedly needs to be reversed. In April 2019, Heinz-Christian Strache campaigning for his FPÖ party ahead of the 2019 European Parliament election endorsed the conspiracy theory. Claiming that "population replacement" in Austria was a real threat, he stated that "We don't want to become a minority in our own country". Compatriot Martin Sellner, who also supports the theory, celebrated Strache's political use of the Great Replacement.

==== Belgium ====
In September 2018, Schild & Vrienden, an extremist Flemish youth organization, were reported to be endorsing the conspiracy theory. The group, claiming that native populations of Europe were being replaced by migrants; they proposed an end to all immigration, forced deportation of non-whites, and the founding of ethnostates. The following month, VRT detailed how the organization was discussing the Great Replacement on secretive chat channels, and using the conspiracy theory to promote Flemish ethnic identity.

In March 2019, Flemish nationalist Dries Van Langenhove of the Vlaams Belang party repeatedly stated that the Flemish people were "being replaced" in Belgium, posting claims on social media which endorsed the Great Replacement theory.

==== Croatia ====
In Croatia, Marin Miletić of right-wing populist Most party repeatedly spread "the great replacement" conspiracy theory. According to Croatian fact-checking news site Faktograf.hr, politicians like: Nikola Grmoja, Igor Peternel, Miro Bulj, Damir Biloglav, Krešimir Rotim and Mate Lukić distinguished themselves most in spreading of disinformation narratives about foreign workers and migrants in Croatia.

==== Denmark ====
Use of the Great Replacement (Danish: Store Udskiftning) conspiracy theory has become common in right-wing Danish political rhetoric. In April 2019, Rasmus Paludan, leader of the Hard Line party, which is widely associated with the Great Replacement, claimed that by the year 2040 ethnic Danish people would be approaching to be a minority in Denmark, having been outnumbered by Muslims and their descendants. During a debate for the 2019 European Parliament elections, Paludan used the concept to justify a proposal to ban Muslim immigration and deport all Islamic residents from the country, in what Le Monde described as Paludan "preaching the 'great replacement theory'".

In June 2019, Pia Kjærsgaard (Danish People's Party) invoked the conspiracy theory while serving as Speaker of the Danish Parliament. After the alleged encouragement of Muslim communities to "vote red", for the Social Democrats; Kjærsgaard asked "What will happen? A replacement of the Danish people?".

==== Finland ====
Far-right Finns Party representatives and ministers have used the word "great replacement" (Finnish: Väestönvaihto) in their writings. Finns Party Speaker of the Parliament Jussi Halla-aho and the party leader and deputy Prime Minister Riikka Purra have also promoted the theory. Halla-aho stated that it is "dishonest to say that the great replacement is not going on, that it would not be rapid, and that it would not continue just as long as it is allowed to continue." Riikka Purra wrote "In any case, I use the term great replacement myself, because that is what this is, as long as this is being actively perpetrated", Purra wrote. "As long as immigration policy is active and promotes immigration, the Finnish population will be exchanged for another". In October 2023 four men were convicted of offences committed with terrorist intent. According to the prosecutor, the defendants were motivated by the idea of a conspiracy of the government and Jewish people to replace the native population. Police said the potential targets of the attack were political decision-makers.

==== Germany ====
Ex-SPD politician Thilo Sarrazin is reported to be one of the most influential promoters of the Great Replacement, having published several books on the subject, some of which, such as Germany Abolishes Itself, are in high circulation. Sarrazin has proposed that there are too many immigrants in Germany, and that they supposedly have lower IQs than Germans. Regarding the demographics of Germany, he has claimed that in a century ethnic Germans will drop in number to 25 million, in 200 years to eight million and in 300 years: three million.

In May 2016, Alternative for Germany (German: Alternative für Deutschland, AfD) deputy leader Beatrix von Storch used a language reminiscent of the theory when she claimed that plans for a mass exchange of populations ("Massenaustausch der Bevölkerung") had long been made.

In April 2017, a few months before he assumed the leadership of the AfD, Alexander Gauland released a press statement regarding the issue of family reunification for refugees, in which he claimed that "Population exchange in Germany is running at full speed". In October 2018, following Beatrix von Storch's lead, Bundestag member Petr Bystron said the Global Compact for Migration was part of the conspiracy to bring about systemic population change in Germany.

In March 2019, Vice Germany reported how AfD MP Harald Laatsch attempted to justify and assign blame for the Christchurch mosque shootings, in relation to his "The Great Exchange" theory, by asserting that the shooter's actions were driven by "overpopulation" from immigrants and "climate protection" against them. Laatsch also claimed that the climate movement, who he labelled "climate panic propagators", had a "shared responsibility" for the massacre, and singled out activist Greta Thunberg.

Similarly, right-wing publicist Martin Lichtmesz denied that either Anders Behring Breivik's 2011 manifesto, which referred to the Eurabia variant of the "white genocide" narrative, or Brenton Tarrant's 2019 The Great Replacement manifesto, had any connection to the theory. Claiming that it was, in fact, not a conspiracy theory at all, Lichtmesz said both Breivik and Tarrant were reacting to a real phenomenon; a "historically unique experiment" of a "Great Exchange" of people.

==== Hungary ====
Prime Minister Viktor Orbán and his political party Fidesz in Hungary have been associated with the conspiracy theory over the course of several years. The Sydney Morning Herald detailed Orbán's belief in and promotion of the Great Replacement as being central to the modern right-wing politics of Europe. In December 2018, he claimed the "Christian identity of Europe" needed saving, and labelled refugees traveling to Europe as "Muslim invaders". In a speech, Orbán asserted: "If in the future Europe is to be populated by people other than Europeans, and we accept this as a fact and see it as natural, then we will effectively be consenting to population replacement: to a process in which the European population is replaced".

He has also stated: "In all of Europe there are fewer and fewer children, and the answer of the West is migration," concluding that "We Hungarians have a different way of thinking. Instead of just numbers, we want Hungarian children." ThinkProgress described the comments as pushing a version of the theory. In April 2019, Radio New Zealand published insight that Orban's plans to cut taxes for large Hungarian families could be linked with fears of the Great Replacement.

==== Iceland ====
In 2025, Centre Party MP Snorri Másson claimed that the Great Replacement Theory was a "statistical fact".

==== Ireland ====
A 2019 Lidl advertisement that featured a white Irish woman, her Afro-Brazilian partner and their mixed race son was targeted by former journalist Gemma O'Doherty as part of an attempt at a "Great Replacement". After facing online harassment the family decided to leave Ireland. The "Great Replacement" has also been used in Ireland in opposition to direct provision centres, used to house asylum seekers.

Writing in 2020, Richard Downes said that "Rather than seeing the increase in non-Irish people living and making their lives here as being a normal part of a modern European country, some of the new nationalists see it as a conspiracy to overwhelm Ireland with foreigners. For many of them the conspirators include the Irish government, NGOs, the EU and the UN. They believe that these organisations want to replace Irish people with brown and black people from abroad."

The term "great replacement" was also used when the RTÉ News featured the three first babies born in 2020, born to Polish, Black and Indian mothers; journalist Fergus Finlay saying "I don't care about the vulgar abuse, but I really do believe that these hatemongers should be prosecuted when they incite others to hatred and violence against people whose only crime is their skin colour or religion. I find it hard to understand why the State hasn't acted already against these cruel ideologues who think they can say whatever they like under the banner of free speech. They may be small in number now, and on the surface they may just seem bonkers, but we've been here before. Political movements have been built on hatred of the other, and we know the damage they have caused."

Garda Commissioner (national chief of police) Drew Harris spoke about far right groups in 2020, saying that "Irish groups [believing] in the great replacement theory" had plans "to disrupt key State institutions and infrastructure. This included Dublin Port, high profile shopping areas such as Grafton Street in Dublin, Dáil Éireann and Government departments."

Some participants in the 2022–2023 Irish anti-immigration protests such as Hermann Kelly and Derek Blighe support a Great Replacement theory, as well as referring to the influx of immigrants as an "invasion" and a "plantation".

In 2024, a Red C survey found that 22% believed the establishment is replacing white people with non-white immigrants and that elected officials wanted more immigration to bring in obedient voters. This is linked with the great replacement theory.

==== Italy ====
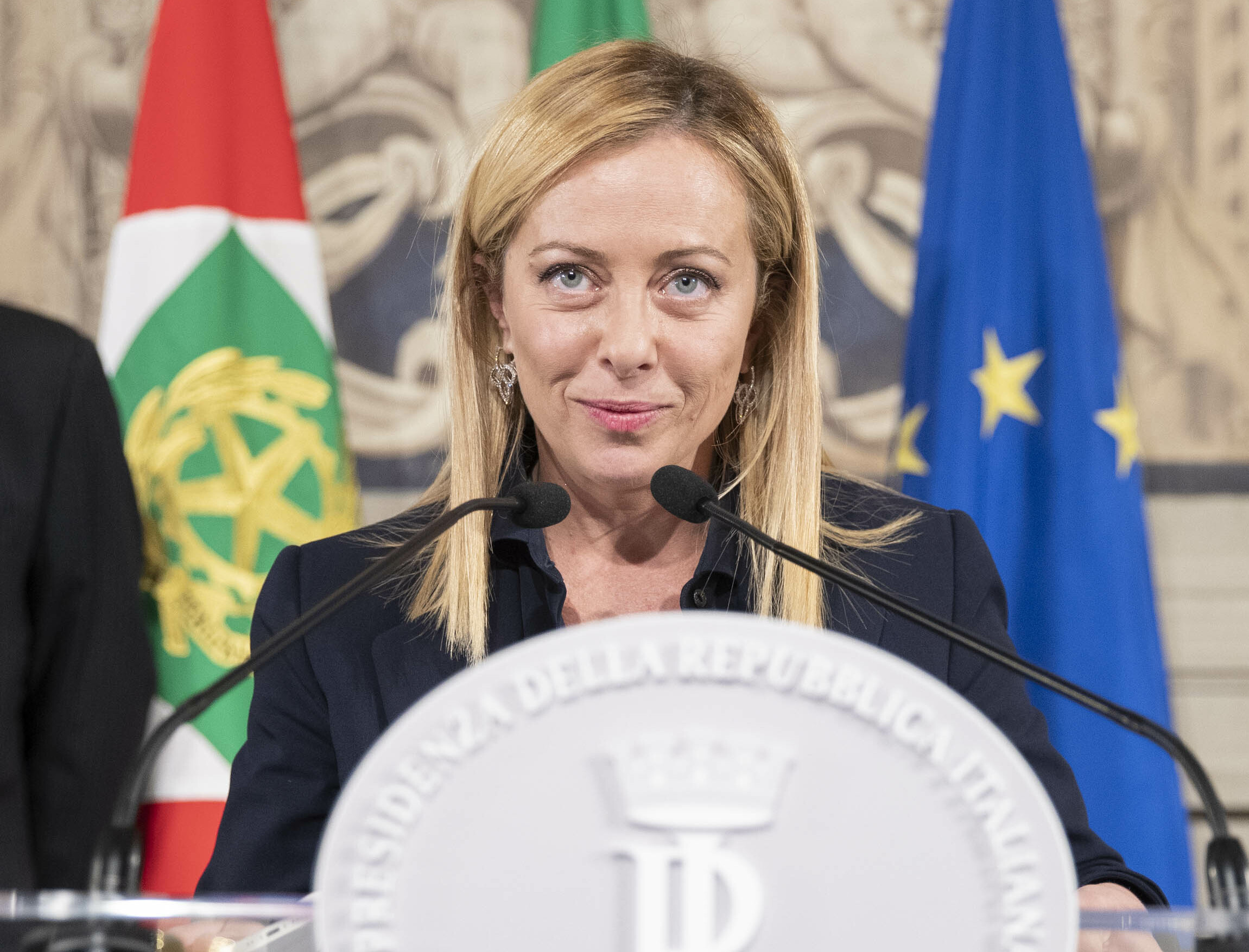
Meloni accepting the task of forming a new government

The current Italian Prime Minister Giorgia Meloni has endorsed the Great Replacement ideology. Deputy Prime Minister Matteo Salvini of Italy (2018–2019) has repeatedly adopted the theme of the Great Replacement. In May 2016, two years before his election to office, he claimed "ethnic replacement is underway" in Italy in an interview with Sky TG24. Accusing nameless, well-funded organizations for importing workers that he named "farm slaves", he stated that there was a "lucrative attempt at genocide" of Italians.

In April 2023, the Minister of Agriculture, Food Sovereignty and Forests Francesco Lollobrigida remarked to a trade union conference that "Italians are having fewer children, so we're replacing them with someone else. [We say] yes to helping births, no to ethnic replacement. That's not the way forward".

==== Netherlands ====
In April 2015, writing on the publishing website GeenStijl, scholar of Islam Hans Jansen used Great Replacement rhetoric, suggesting that it was an "undisputed" fact that among the European Union's governing elite there was a common consensus that Europeans were "no good and can be better replaced". In May 2015, Martin Bosma, a Dutch parliament Representative for the Party for Freedom (PVV), released his book Minority in their own land. Invoking the conspiracy theory, Bosma wrote about a growing 'a new population' of immigrants which lent itself to an apparently 'post-racial Multicultural State of Salvation'.

In March 2017, Thierry Baudet, leader of the right wing Forum for Democracy (FvD) party, promoted the theory after he claimed that the country's so-called elite were deliberately "homeopathically diluting" the Dutch population, in a speech about "national self-hatred". He said there was a plot to racially mix the ethnic Dutch with "all the people of the world", so that there would "never be a Dutchman again".

In January 2018, PVV Representative Martin Bosma endorsed the Great Replacement theory, and one of its key propagators, after meeting with Renaud Camus at a PVV demonstration in Rotterdam and tweeting his support. Filip Dewinter, a leading member of the Flemish secessionist Vlaams Belang party, who had traveled to the Netherlands on the day of the protest to meet with Camus, named him as a "visionary man" to the media.

Party for Freedom politician Geert Wilders of the Netherlands supports the notion of a Great Replacement occurring in Europe. In October 2018, Wilders invoked the conspiracy theory, claiming the Netherlands was "being replaced with mass immigration from non-western Islamic countries" and Rotterdam being "the port of Eurabia". He claimed 77 million, mainly Islamic immigrants would attempt to enter Europe over the course of half a century, and that white Europeans would cease to exist unless they were stopped. In 2019, The New York Times reported how Camus's demographic-based alarmist theories help fuel Wilders and his Party for Freedom's nativist campaigning.

In September 2018, Dutch author Paul Scheffer analyzed the Great Replacement and its political developments, suggesting that Forum for Democracy and Party for Freedom were forming policy regarding the demography of the Netherlands through the lens of the conspiracy theory.

==== Spain ====
The far-right party Vox has been described as circulating the theory for its discourse about low natality rates in Spaniards compared to migrants. According to journalist Antonio Maestre of El Diario, such an ideology is shared between Vox and some extreme strains of Catalan nationalism who fear replacement by Spanish-speakers.

==== United Kingdom ====
According to November 2018 research from the University of Cambridge, 31% of Brexit voters believe in the conspiracy theory compared to 6% of British people who oppose Brexit.

In July 2019, left-wing English musician and activist Billy Bragg released a public statement which accused fellow singer-songwriter Morrissey of endorsing the theory. Bragg suggested "that Morrissey is helping to spread this idea—which inspired the Christchurch mosque murderer—is beyond doubt".

Prior to the 2024 United Kingdom general election, videos of non-white people in London with captions such as "This is not Iran" spread on social media. Hope not Hate researcher Patrik Hermansson described the videos as prime examples of dog whistles due to using language and imagery that direct viewers to the conspiracy theory without explicitly referencing it. He said, "[The videos] are dangerous because they often avoid moderation and appear acceptable by seeming neutral in how they present reality".

==== Turkey ====
Leader of the Victory Party Ümit Özdağ uses a Turkish version of the theory. He previously argued that Turkey will be a "Migrantland" (Göçmenistan) unless Kemal Kılıçdaroğlu wins the 2023 Turkish presidential election.

=== North America ===
==== Canada ====
YouTuber Lauren Southern of Canada has helped amplify the conspiracy theory. In 2017, Southern dedicated a video to the Great Replacement, gaining over half a million views on her channel, before it was deleted. 2018 mayoral candidate for Toronto Faith Goldy has publicly embraced the replacement theory. In 2019, in the aftermath of the Christchurch mosque shootings in Christchurch, New Zealand, Vice accused Goldy of routinely pushing the same ideas of birthrate declines and the population replacement of whites, found in the gunman's The Great Replacement manifesto. When white nationalist Paul Fromm co-opted the pre-1967 Canadian national flag, the Canadian Red Ensign, he referred to it as "the flag of the true Canada, the European Canada before the treasonous European replacement schemes brought in by the 1965 immigration policies".

In June 2019, columnist Lindsay Shepherd claimed that "whites are becoming a minority" in the West, describing her assertion as "population replacement". She was criticized by Canadian MP Colin Fraser at a House of Commons justice committee for not denouncing the concept, while Nathaniel Erskine-Smith accused Shepherd of openly embracing the conspiracy theory.

The political commentator Mathieu Bock-Côté is known to frequently amplify the Great Replacement theory (French: Grand Remplacement) into mainstream media with his political ideologies.

==== United States ====
The Great replacement in the United States is the American version of a white nationalist far-right conspiracy theory that racial minorities are displacing the traditional white American population and taking control of the nation. Versions of the theory "have become commonplace" in the Republican Party of the United States, and have become a major issue of political debate. It also has stimulated violent responses including mass murders. It resembles the Great Replacement theory promoted in Europe, but has its origins in American nativism around 1900. According to Erika Lee, in 1894 the old stock Yankee upper-class founders of the Immigration Restriction League were, "convinced that Anglo-Saxon traditions, peoples, and culture were being drowned in a flood of racially inferior foreigners from Southern and Eastern Europe."

A May 2022 poll by Yahoo! News and YouGov found that 61% of people who voted for Donald Trump in the 2020 United States presidential election believe that "a group of people in this country are trying to replace native-born Americans with immigrants and people of color who share their political views."

=== Oceania ===
==== Australia ====
The media in Australia have covered former Senator Fraser Anning of Queensland and his endorsement of the Great Replacement conspiracy theory. In April 2019, Reuters reported how Anning was amplifying replacement theory by suggesting that Muslims would "out-breed us very quickly". In May 2019, Anning alleged that white Australians would "fast become a minority" if they did not defend their "ethno-cultural identity".

==== New Zealand ====
In 2019, an Australian man shot and killed 51 people in Christchurch. The attacker was motivated by the Great Replacement conspiracy theory and "white genocide" concept, as well as islamophobia. The attacker wrote a 74-page manifesto titled "The Great Replacement" and published it minutes before starting the attack.

The far right neo-Nazi youth group Action Zealandia has endorsed the Great Replacement theory, alleging that European identity in New Zealand is being threatened by economically driven non-white migration. In addition, the group has promoted the pseudohistorical notion that white people settled in New Zealand before the arrival of the indigenous Māori people. According to the journalist Marc Daalder, Action Zealandia is the successor to the Dominion Movement, a far right group that ceased its activities following the 2019 Christchurch mosque shootings.

=== Asia ===
==== India ====
Adherents of Hindutva, a Hindu nationalist ideology that emerged in the early 1920s and further serves as the ideology of the ruling Bharatiya Janata Party (BJP) in India, have frequently fuelled fears of the demographic erasure of Hindus by Muslims. They have alleged that Muslims have higher fertility rates compared to other Indian communities and forced religious conversions are reducing the number of Hindus. In 2022, Hindu nationalist Yati Narsinghanand was arrested on hate speech charges and spoke about the risk of a Muslim prime minister in 2029, which he said would lead to killings and forced conversions of Hindus. Members of India's parliament and Indian television channels have also mainstreamed the claim of a demographic threat to Hindus. India's former chief election commissioner, S.Y. Quraishi, said that fearmongering over the threat to a Hindu majority has increased since the 2014 general election, when the BJP was elected to power.

==== Japan ====
It has been argued that Sanseitō, a right-wing Japanese ultranationalist party, has drawn ideas from its rhetoric on immigration from the Western Great Replacement theory, as well as from the America First and Make America Great Again (MAGA) movements. While Japan's immigration rate is much lower than Western rates, Japan similarly has a declining birth rate, often lower than in much of the West.

==== Malaysia ====
Hard right conservatives in Malaysia have expressed fears that local Indian communities, often of Tamil descent, may oust Malay Muslims, who are the current majority in Malaysia. These fears were heightened due to the Sri Lankan Civil War, backlash against activities of the Hindu Rights Action Force, and Hindu nationalism in India. Political actors have exploited this to acquire votes in Malaysia's heartland and to rally opposition against ratifying the International Convention on the Elimination of All Forms of Racial Discrimination.

==== Singapore ====
On 6 June 2026, Singapore's Ministry of Home Affairs (MHA) ordered Facebook, Twitter (X) and YouTube to block 14 online posts targeting the Indian community with claims that they were replacing Singapore's ethnic Chinese majority. Investigations found that the posts had likely come from platforms based in China before spreading elsewhere.

=== Africa ===
==== Tunisia ====
In February 2023, the President of Tunisia Kais Saied made comments about sub-Saharan African immigration into Tunisia, saying that they were changing the demographic makeup of the country in order to make it a "purely African" nation. This was widely interpreted as a Tunisian (or Arabic) version of the great replacement conspiracy theory allegedly in an attempt to distract voters from the policy failures of his government.

== Influence on white nationalist terrorism ==
=== Implicit call to violence ===
Camus's use of strong terms like "colonization" and "Occupiers" to label non-European immigrants and their children have been described as implicit calls to violence. Scholars like Jean-Yves Camus have argued that the "Great Replacement" conspiracy theory closely parallels the concept of "remigration", a euphemistic term for the forced deportation of non-white immigrants. "We shall not leave Europe, we shall make Africa leave Europe," Camus wrote in 2019 to define his political agenda for the European parliament elections. He has also used another euphemism, the "Great Repatriation", to refer to remigration. (Note: French: Grand Rapatriement)

According to historians Nicolas Bancel and Pascal Blanchard, along with sociologist Ahmed Boubeker, "the announcement of a civil war is implicit in the theory of the 'great replacement' [...] This thesis is extreme—and so simplistic that it can be understood by anyone—because it validates a racial definition of the nation." Sceptical of Camus's description of second or third generation immigrants as being itself a contradiction in terms—"they do not migrate anymore, they are French"—demographer Hervé Le Bras is also critical of their designation as a fifth column in France or an "internal enemy".

Legal scholars Khaled A. Beydoun and Nura A. Sediqe argue that repurposing counterterrorism strategies created post-9/11 fails to stop white supremacist networks, because existing biases in local and federal police agencies keep them from dealing with the threat fairly or effectively.

=== Inspired attacks ===
Fears of the white race's extinction, and replacement theory in particular, have been cited by several accused perpetrators of mass shootings between 2018, 2019 and 2022. While Camus has stated his own philosophy is a nonviolent one, analysts including Heidi Beirich of the Southern Poverty Law Center say the idea of white genocide has "undoubtedly influenced" American white supremacists, potentially leading to violence.

In October 2018, a gunman killed 11 people and injured 6 in an attack on the Tree of Life synagogue in Pittsburgh, Pennsylvania. The gunman believed Jews were deliberately importing non-white immigrants into the United States as part of a conspiracy against the white race.

Brenton Harrison Tarrant, the Australian terrorist responsible for the mass shootings at Al Noor Mosque and Linwood Islamic Centre in Christchurch, New Zealand, on 15 March 2019, that killed 51 people and injured 49, named his manifesto The Great Replacement, a reference to Camus's book. In response, Camus condemned violence while reaffirming his desire for a "counter-revolt" against an increase in nonwhite populations.

In 2019, research by the Institute for Strategic Dialogue showed over 24,000 social media mentions of the Great Replacement in the month before the Christchurch shootings, in comparison to just 3,431 mentions in April 2012. The use of the term spiked in April 2019 after the Christchurch mosque shootings.

Patrick Crusius, the suspect in the 2019 El Paso shooting, posted an online manifesto titled The Inconvenient Truth alluding to the "great replacement" and expressing support for "the Christchurch shooter" minutes before the attack. It spoke of a "Hispanic invasion of Texas" leading to "cultural and ethnic replacement" (alluding to the Reconquista) as justifications for the shooting.

The suspect accused in the 2022 Buffalo shooting listed the Great Replacement in a manifesto he had published prior to the attack. The suspect described himself as a fascist, white supremacist, and antisemite.

== Proponents ==
- Elon Musk
- Charlie Kirk
- Tucker Carlson
- Davor Domazet-Lošo
- Mark Finchem
- Matt Gaetz
- Jussi Halla-aho
- Laura Ingraham
- Ron Johnson
- Hermann Kelly
- Steve King
- Blake Masters
- Giorgia Meloni, Prime Minister of Italy
- Robert Ménard
- Viktor Orbán, former Prime Minister of Hungary
- Riikka Purra
- Wendy Rogers
- Lauren Southern
- John Waters, Irish writer
- Éric Zemmour
- Kais Saïed, President of Tunisia
- Paul Golding

== See also ==
- Declinism – Belief that something is tending towards decline
- Demographic engineering – Deliberate efforts to shift the ethnic balance of an area
- Race suicide – Alarmist term used in eugenics
- Replacement migration – Theory of human migration
- The Protocols of the Elders of Zion – 1903 antisemitic text
- The Rising Tide of Color Against White World-Supremacy – Book by Lothrop Stoddard
- White demographic decline – Population decrease of Whites proportionate to the total population
