= Éric Zemmour =

French politician and writer (born 1958)

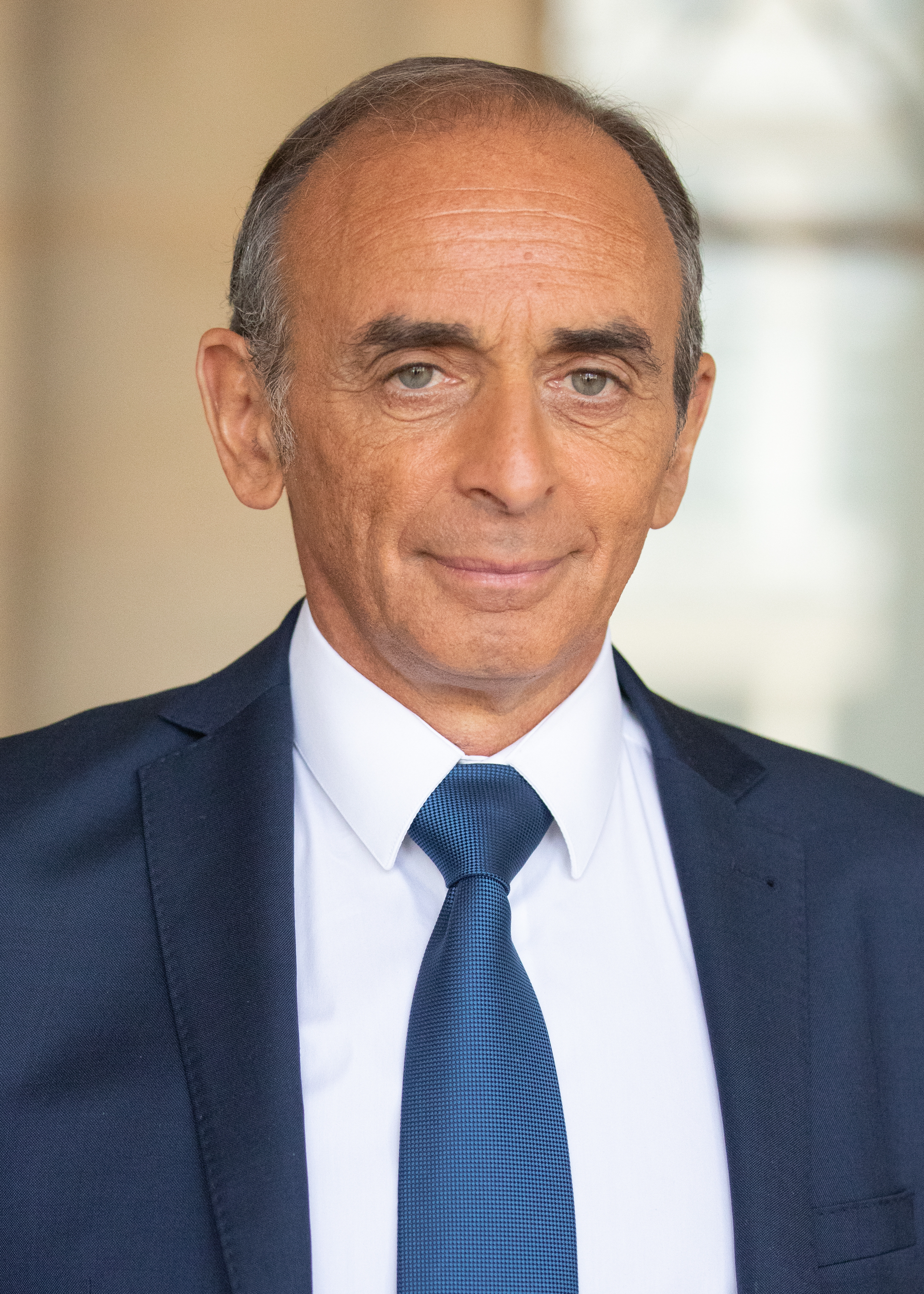
- Zemmour in 2022

President of Reconquête
- Incumbent
- Assumed office 5 December 2021
- Preceded by: Office established

Personal details
- Born: Éric Justin Léon Zemmour; 31 August 1958 (age 68) Montreuil, France
- Party: Reconquête (since 2021)
- Spouse: Mylène Chichportich (m. 1982; sep. 2021)
- Domestic partner: Sarah Knafo (2021–present)
- Children: 3
- Education: Sciences Po
- Occupation: Politician; essayist; political journalist
- Awards: Prix Richelieu, Prix Combourg-Chateaubriand
- Website: YouTube channel
- Nickname: "Le Z"
- Writing career
- Subjects: Political history, cultural evolution, opposition to immigration
- Notable works: L'homme qui ne s'aimait pas Le premier sexe Mélancolie française Le Suicide français Destin français La France n'a pas dit son dernier mot

Éric Justin Léon Zemmour (French: [erik zɛmur]; born 31 August 1958) is a French far-right (Note: Zemmour is commonly presented as a far-right pundit in news outlets in France.: "La Croix". La Croix. 26 July 2021. Archived from the original on 16 September 2021.; "Le Point". 3 September 2021. Archived from the original on 6 September 2021.; "Marianne". 21 June 2021. Archived from the original on 8 September 2021.; "Le Monde". Le Monde.fr. 4 June 2020. Archived from the original on 27 August 2021.; "Challenges". 9 October 2015. Archived from the original on 27 October 2021.; "Europe 1". 28 January 2020. Archived from the original on 25 May 2021.; "LCI". 27 January 2018. Archived from the original on 16 October 2021.; "France Bleu". 14 October 2016. Archived from the original on 25 May 2021.; "20 Minutes". 12 April 2019. Archived from the original on 6 September 2021.; "Le HuffPost". 8 February 2020. Archived from the original on 5 September 2021.; "Le Parisien". 25 September 2020. Archived from the original on 27 September 2021.; "La Voix du Nord". 29 October 2019. Archived from the original on 14 January 2021.; "Le Courrier picard". 29 October 2019. Archived from the original on 25 May 2021.; "La Provence". July 2020. Archived from the original on 8 September 2021.; "Libération". Libération. Archived from the original on 10 September 2021.; "Mediapart". 31 May 2020. Archived from the original on 25 May 2021.; "L'Obs". 14 October 2019. Archived from the original on 16 October 2021.; "Les Inrocks". Les Inrockuptibles. 21 September 2018. Archived from the original on 22 January 2021.; "L'Humanité". 29 October 2019. Archived from the original on 1 December 2020.; "Numerama". 12 January 2020. Archived from the original on 25 May 2021.; "Charlie Hebdo". 8 November 2019. Archived from the original on 8 October 2021.; "Acrimed". 8 November 2019. Archived from the original on 19 July 2021.; "Arrêt sur images". 6 October 2019. Archived from the original on 25 May 2021.; "Juriguide". 2 October 2019. Archived from the original on 25 May 2021.; "Le Courrier de l'Atlas". 18 September 2018. Archived from the original on 25 May 2021.; "Jeune Afrique". 12 October 2018. Archived from the original on 27 January 2021.; "Streetpress". Archived from the original on 25 May 2021.; Many British or American media outlets also present him as "far-right": Pineau, Elizabeth (21 September 2021). "Right-wing chat-show celebrity may alter France's election dynamics". Reuters. Archived from the original on 8 October 2021.; "Eric Zemmour: A French Trump or a French Farage?". Politico. 16 September 2021. Archived from the original on 11 October 2021.; Norimitsu, Onishi (21 September 2021). "From TV to the French Presidency? A Right-Wing Star Is Inspired by Trump". The New York Times. Archived from the original on 21 September 2021.; Murray, Douglas (8 October 2021). "The technocrats of the European Union won't be able to survive the next French revolution". Telegraph. Archived from the original on 17 October 2021.; Keiger, John (6 October 2021). "Eric Zemmour has already revolutionised the French Right". Telegraph. Archived from the original on 25 October 2021.) (Note: Many French media outlets present him "on the right", on the "conservative right", as "Gaullist", on the "sovereignist right", on the "radical right", or on the "radical and identitary right".: "L'Express". 16 July 2021.; "Libération".; "La Presse.ca". La Presse. 28 June 2021.; "Entreprendre". 5 December 2020. Archived from the original on 24 January 2022.; "Le JDD". 16 December 2018.; "Midi Libre".; "Nice-Presse". 4 September 2021. Archived from the original on 6 October 2021.; "Ouest-France". 10 February 2021.; "France inter". 24 November 2019.; "Courrier international – Il Foglio". 9 July 2019.; "Vanity Fair". 7 February 2019.; "Le Parisien". 28 February 2019.; "L'Obs". 17 February 2021.; "L'Opinion". August 2019.; "LCI". 7 June 2021.; "Le Soir.be". 29 July 2021.) politician, essayist, writer, political journalist and pundit. He was an editor and panelist on Face à l'Info, a daily show broadcast on CNews, from 2019 to 2021. He ran in the 2022 French presidential election, in which he placed fourth in the first round.

Born in the Parisian suburb of Montreuil, Zemmour studied at Sciences Po. He worked as a reporter for Le Quotidien de Paris from 1986 to 1996. He then joined Le Figaro, where he worked until 2021. (Note: Between 2010 and 2013, Zemmour was reassigned to Le Figaro Magazine. Some sources say the move was caused by an insufficient production in comparison to his salary, while other sources contend that the move followed his conviction for incitement to racial discrimination and fine of €2,000.) Zemmour also became known as a television personality, appearing as a pundit or co-host on shows such as On n'est pas couché on France 2 (2006–2011) and Ça se dispute on I-Télé (2003–2014), as well as Zemmour et Naulleau (2011–2021), a weekly evening talk show on Paris Première, together with literary critic Éric Naulleau. Zemmour also worked for RTL from 2010 until 2019, first hosting the daily radio show, Z comme Zemmour, prior to joining Yves Calvi's morning news show as an analyst. His book The Suicide of France sold more than 500,000 copies in 2014.

Zemmour is well known for his controversial views regarding immigration and Islam in France. He is a proponent of the Great Replacement theory contending that white people in France are being deliberately replaced by Muslims. Zemmour was fined for incitement to racial discrimination in 2011 and for incitement of hate against Muslims in 2018. He appealed the conviction before the European Court of Human Rights but he lost the appeal. He was acquitted six times of similar charges, in 2008, 2014 (twice), 2016, 2017 and 2019. Convictions in 2015 and 2020 were overturned on appeal.

Zemmour announced his candidacy for the 2022 French presidential election on 30 November 2021. On 5 December 2021, he launched Reconquête, a nationalist political party. In 2021, a New York Times article described Zemmour's views as "hard-line... on immigration, Islam's place in France and national identity", while he self-identifies as Gaullist and Bonapartist. During his presidential campaign, Zemmour advocated vast changes in France's political system. He endorsed Marine Le Pen for the second round.

Zemmour was a candidate for a parliamentary seat in the Saint-Tropez-centred 4th constituency of the Var department in the 2022 legislative election but was eliminated in the first round, placing third.

== Life and career ==
=== Early life and family ===
Zemmour was born on 31 August 1958 in the Seine department, now part of Seine-Saint-Denis. According to Zemmour himself, his parents were Berber Jews, whose last name means olive tree in Berber. Although Arabic-speaking from French Algeria, they held French citizenship in accordance with the Crémieux Decree of 1870. They had moved to metropolitan France in 1952, before the Algerian War, alongside their parents and siblings. Upon their arrival in France, Zemmour's paternal grandparents, born Liaou and Messouka, took the names Justin and Rachel, and maternal grandmother, born Ourida, took her middle name Claire. Zemmour's maternal grandfather—who served as his namesake—was named Léon.

Zemmour's parents were Roger Zemmour, a paramedic, and Lucette, a housewife. His father was often absent and so he was principally raised by his mother and grandmother; he has since said that this helped him to forge his character, and that it was his mother who instilled in him drive and ambition for excellence. He has one younger brother, Jean-Luc.

Zemmour grew up first in Drancy and later in the Paris Château Rouge quarter. He was brought up in the Jewish faith. Although private about his faith, he follows the directions of the Halakha and attended synagogues frequently until the death of his father in 2013. He has stated that his Jewish name is "Moïse".

=== Education ===
Zemmour attended Jewish private schools, École Lucien-de-Hirsh and École Yabné. He graduated from the Institut d'études politiques de Paris in 1979. He subsequently failed twice (in 1980 and 1981) to gain admission to the École nationale d'administration (ÉNA). However, he later became member of the admissions committee of the school in 2006.

=== Personal life ===
Zemmour has been married to Mylène Chichportich, a bankruptcy lawyer of Tunisian Jewish descent, since 1982. Chichportich maintains a low media profile and never comments on her husband's controversies. The couple has two sons and a daughter.

In 2021, Zemmour was alleged by French gossip magazines to have impregnated his chief campaign advisor, Sarah Knafo. He recognised her as his partner in January 2022. Knafo later denied ever having been pregnant.

In a 2014 interview with Le Point, Zemmour stated that although he does not believe in God, he keeps a kosher home and occasionally attends synagogue services on High Holy Days.

=== Political journalist ===
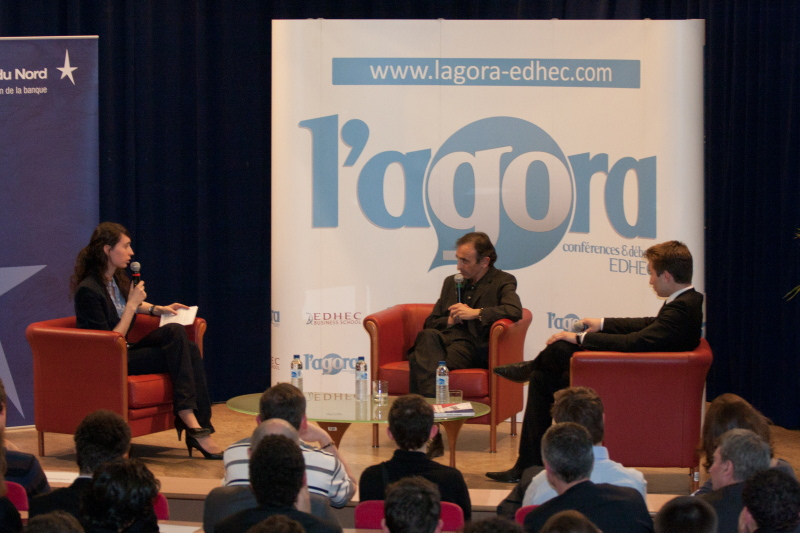
Zemmour in 2011

Zemmour began his career in 1986 on the politics desk at Le Quotidien de Paris, under the editorship of Philippe Tesson. After the newspaper went out of business in 1994, he became a lead writer at Info-Matin, where he stayed for a year. He joined Le Figaro in 1996 as a political journalist. During this period, Zemmour was also a freelancer for Marianne (1997) and for Valeurs actuelles (1999).

According to Libération, Zemmour had called for a political union of the French right-wing parties during the 1990s, cultivating contacts with the founder and president of the National Front Jean-Marie Le Pen ("who Zemmour was unique amongst journalists in addressing as president"), as well as his rival, Bruno Mégret.

In 2009, Zemmour was moved by Le Figaro to Le Figaro Magazine, allegedly after making controversial statements in other media, but in fact, due to his salary being considered too high for his modest weekly output. He was moved back to Le Figaro as a permanent journalist in 2013, where he wrote regularly, including as a literary reviewer, until he took time off in September 2021 to promote his new book.

Zemmour was a political columnist at Le Spectacle du Monde, a monthly publication by the Valeurs Actuelles group, from 2013 until it ceased publication in July 2014.

=== Author ===
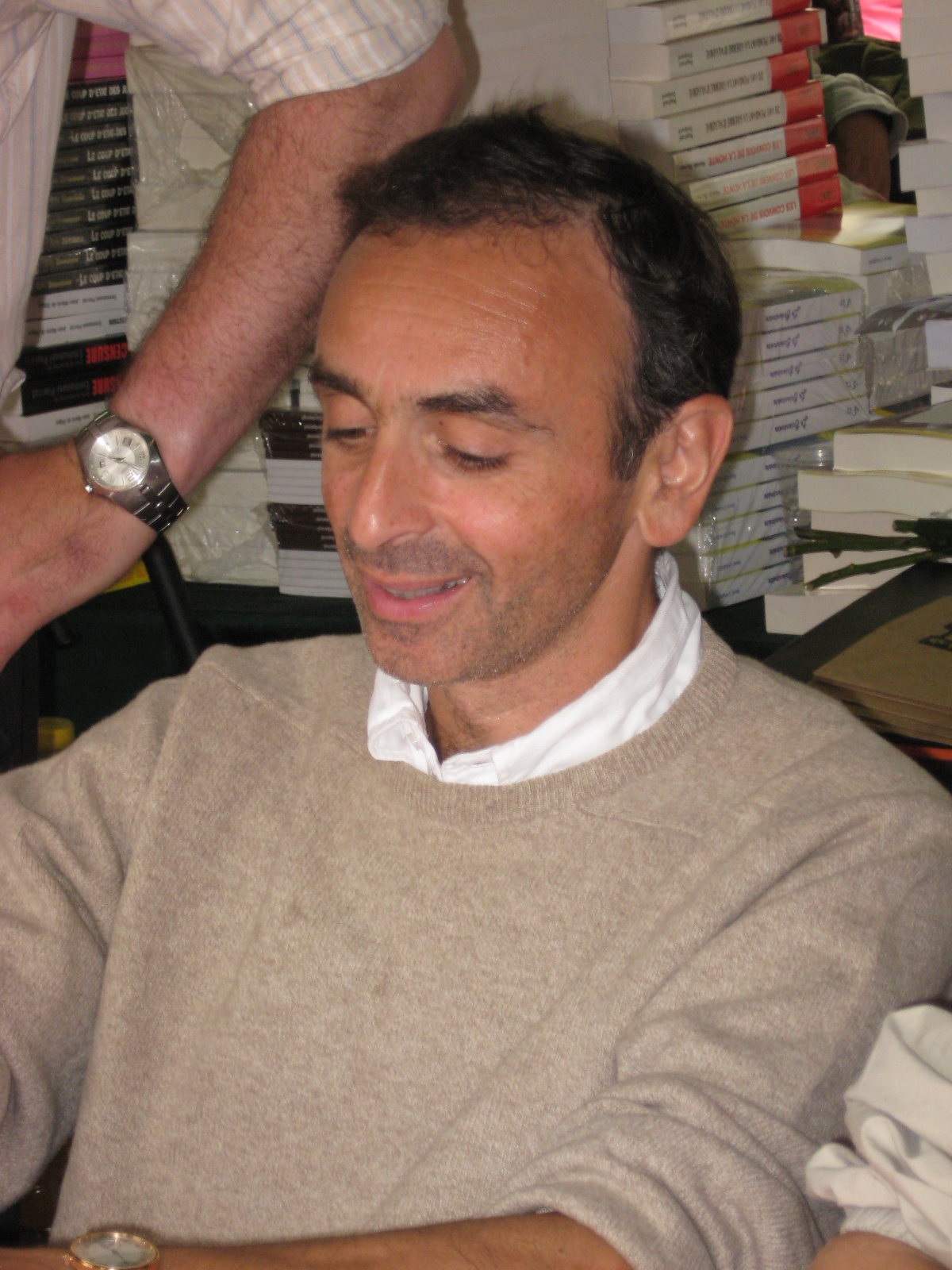
Zemmour at a book signing in 2008

Zemmour has written biographies of Prime Minister Édouard Balladur (Balladur, immobile à grands pas, or "Balladur, Motionless With Great Strides") and President Jacques Chirac (L'Homme qui ne s'aimait pas, or "The Man Who Did Not Like Himself") along with political essays. Notably, in 2006 he published Le premier sexe ("The First Sex"), a book on what he considers to be the feminisation of society. He worked on the screenplay for the film Dans la peau de Jacques Chirac by Michel Royer and Karl Zéro, although the latter stated that Zemmour's writing was only used to a limited extent.

In 2008, he published Petit Frère, in a limited run of 63,000 copies, in which he criticised "antiracist angelism". In March 2010, with his book Mélancolie française ("French Melancholy"), which won the Prix du livre incorrect (lit. 'Inappropriate Book Award'), he considers alternate histories of France, that imagines if some events had not happened.

In 2014, Zemmour published The Suicide of France, which sold over half a million copies and remains his best literary success to date. In it, he defends his thesis that the French nation-state has weakened since the 1970s, which he most notably attributes to the influence of the "May '68 generation".

In Destin français ("French Destiny"), published in 2018, he put events from his own life story in the context of various historical events. He once again addressed the history of France, as well as discussing the influence of Islam in France, which he sees as growing generally in French society.

His book La France n'a pas dit son dernier mot ("France Has Not Spoken Its Last Word"), released on 15 September 2021, made Zemmour an estimated €1.3 million in three weeks, according to Le Parisien, selling over 80,000 copies in the first four days and 165,000 copies in the first 3 weeks.

=== Television and radio personality ===
Beginning in September 2003, he participated weekly on the show Ça se dispute on the 24-hour news channel i>Télé first alongside Christophe Barbier and later Nicolas Domenach. The channel decided to cancel the programme in December 2014, after Zemmour's comments on Islam in the Italian newspaper Corriere della Sera. The channel was later ordered to pay Zemmour €50,000 for wrongful breach of contract.

Zemmour also appeared on Vendredi pétantes on Canal+ until June 2006, and starting September 2006, he rejoined France 2 to participate on the show On n'est pas couché, hosted by Laurent Ruquier, accompanied by Michel Polac and then Éric Naulleau, where they were responsible for presenting honest criticism of films, books or most notably musical albums. During the show, their exchanges with cultural figures sometimes ended in clashes. On 27 May 2011, Ruquier announced in Le Parisien that he was replacing Zemmour and Naulleau with new contributors for the next season of On n'est pas couché.

Éric Zemmour was also a participant on the show L'Hebdo as an editorialist on Tempo, a channel for the overseas departments and territories; he was accompanied by, among others, sociologist Dominique Wolton. Finally, he was on the cable network Histoire on the show Le grand débat, hosted by Michel Field. Since 4 January 2010, he has presented a short piece on RTL entitled Z comme Zemmour every Monday and Friday, during which he presents topical news analysis. Since September 2011, he has hosted Zemmour et Naulleau alongside Éric Naulleau, an evening talk show on Paris Première. In 2021, Zemmour's show was receiving about 900,000 nightly viewers, ten times higher than in 2019.

In 2015, following the Charlie Hebdo shooting, Zemmour was temporarily placed under armed police protection. On 30 April 2020, Zemmour was insulted and threatened in Paris as he was walking by himself carrying bags of groceries. The incident was recorded by the perpetrator himself who posted the video on social media, boasting about his act as Zemmour was filmed ignoring the man and trying to walk away.

Shortly thereafter, Zemmour received a phone call from President Emmanuel Macron in which they discussed the incident. The perpetrator, who later also recorded himself saying Zemmour is "too good at debate, what do you want to do except insult him", received a suspended prison sentence of three months on 8 September 2020. On 27 September 2021, Zemmour was again threatened in Paris, when a man shouted a death threat in the name of Islam. Since October 2020, he has again been under permanent armed police protection.

In 2025, he appeared in London for Tommy Robinson's Unite The Kingdom rally.

== Candidacy in the 2022 presidential election ==
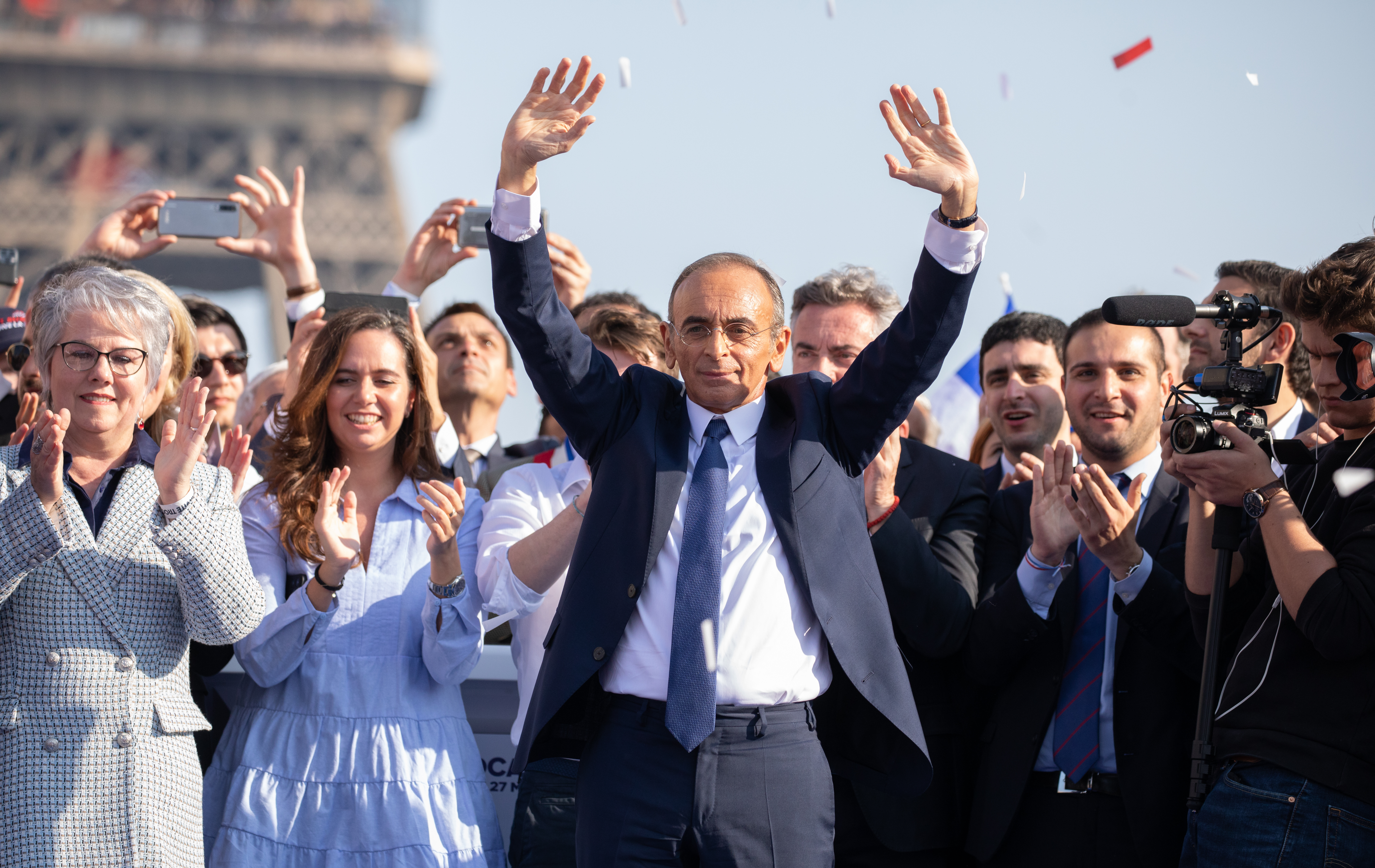
Zemmour at a meeting next to the Trocadéro, 27 March 2022

Zemmour's potential candidacy for the French presidency was first discussed in 2019 as no clear candidate from the traditional right-wing parties had emerged in advance of the 2022 French presidential election. Zemmour then announced that he was thinking about "a platform of ideas for the right". The media also took notice of the presence in his entourage of Sarah Knafo, a political campaigner.

In 2021, he engaged in a national tour of France to promote of his new book, La France n'a pas dit son dernier mot. Appearing as a guest on France 2 on 11 September in Laurent Ruquier's On est en direct programme, Zemmour would not confirm whether he would announce his candidacy. He reiterated this position throughout September on RTL, BFMTV, CNews, and LCI. On 28 September, Le Parisien revealed that Zemmour already had at his disposal a large office space, in the 8th arrondissement of Paris, rented by the association "The Friends of Éric Zemmour".

On 24 September, Zemmour engaged in a widely publicized two-hour-long televised debate with left-wing presidential candidate Jean-Luc Mélenchon, attracting over 3.8 million viewers. On 30 November Eric Zemmour declared himself a candidate for the 2022 presidential election. On 5 December, he revealed his political party would be called "Reconquête". On 9 December 2021, Zemmour debated Bruno Le Maire on Elysée 2022, a presidential debate which was aired on France 2. During the debate, he said that the #MeToo is a movement of "eradication of men". Zemmour finished in fourth place during the first round of the 2022 election and was eliminated. He subsequently endorsed Marine Le Pen ahead of the second round.

=== Polls for the 2022 presidential election ===
Zemmour's candidacy has been tested in several polls since June 2021. The first time he appeared in a poll, in June 2021, the Institut français d'opinion publique (IFOP) credited him with 5.5% of the vote. In August 2021, he was credited with 7% of voting intentions according to Ipsos. On 14 September he was credited by Harris Interactive with 10% of voting intentions.

On 1 October 2021, with opinion polls showing him with 15% of voting intentions, putting him in third place overall, only 1 point behind National Rally candidate Marine Le Pen. Hence, he was in a potentially competitive position to reach the second round of the election. On 6 October, Zemmour reached 17% of voting intentions, in second place among all of the candidates for the first time, which, if realized, would have seen him reach the second voting round. Throughout October and November, before the confirmation of The Republicans' candidate, Le Pen and Zemmour were close in polls to come second behind Macron in the first round.

In December 2021, polls credited him with 12–14% of the vote, placing him fourth in the race, behind Macron, Valérie Pécresse (who had won the primary for The Republicans on 4 December) and Le Pen. In mid-January 2022, BBC correspondent Hugh Schofield commented following Zemmour's hate speech conviction that "in the last few weeks, Zemmour's star, which shone so brightly in the autumn, has shown distinct signs of fading. This verdict will entrench some in their support for the man. But it may also convince others that he is indeed beyond the pale".

Zemmour received notable endorsements from Philippe de Villiers, Jean-Marie Le Pen, Jacques Bompard, Jean-Frédéric Poisson, Jacline Mouraud, Paul-Marie Coûteaux, Jérôme Rivière, Guillaume Peltier, Joachim Son-Forget and Christine Boutin in the early stages of his campaign. In February 2022, Zemmour saw a resurgence in the polls, as he again rose to second place behind Macron.

== Positions ==
=== Political orientation ===
Zemmour in 2012

Zemmour identifies his political leanings as "Gaullo-Bonapartiste", a set of views inspired by Gaullism and Bonapartism. This has been defined in more concrete terms by the historian Nicolas Lebourg, who wrote that Zemmour's politics are defined by four elements. Firstly, Bonapartism: Zemmour believes in the importance of "great men" in the fate of a country. Secondly, unitarism, a great importance is given to the unity of a nation state.

Thirdly, "complete sovereignty": Zemmour believes that all of a nation's problems can be solved by the sovereignty of the nation state. The fourth element of Zemmour's ideas is a "nationalism obsessed with decadence" which would take the form of a sort of Darwinism: if the French people don't change, they will be "swept away by history".

Zemmour has been commonly presented as a "far-right pundit" in French and international media. Historian Laurent Joly wrote in 2015 that "since Barrès and Maurras, no other intellectual, journalist or writer has had this status as a broker of far-right ideas with a very large readership".

On the contrary, political scientist Jean-Yves Camus has opposed designating Zemmour as far-right, claiming that Zemmour was not a fascist or a Nazi. Asked in October 2021 on the positioning of Eric Zemmour in relation to Marine Le Pen, Camus ranks him "on the right", more precisely in the "radical conservative right". Some French media outlets also present him "on the right", in the "conservative right", or as Gaullist, or in the "sovereignist right", or in the "radical right", or in the "radical and identitary right".

=== Social issues ===
Zemmour takes a conservative stance on social issues and has identified as a reactionary.

He regrets that France abolished the death penalty and has expressed philosophical views in favour of it.

==== French decline ====
Zemmour has expressed the view that the French nation-state has been in a state of decline since the 1970s, which he has attributed to the rise of immigration, feminism, left-wing politics and the erosion of traditional values. He presented these views at length in his 2014 essay The Suicide of France. Zemmour has therefore been associated with declinism.

In a review of The Suicide of France in The New Yorker, Alexander Stille argued that Zemmour significantly overstates the decline of France which, while no longer a great power, "remains among the top twenty countries by virtually all measures of the World Bank's Human Development Index."

==== Immigration and assimilation ====
Zemmour is a proponent of the Great Replacement conspiracy theory, contending that white people in France are being replaced by Muslims.

Interviewed in August 2021 on his views on immigration in France, Zemmour declared: "We have to stop the flow. I'm not just talking about the illegals; I am thinking first of legal immigration. ... There is a process of replacing the population from the moment there are too many immigrants who no longer assimilate. It's inevitable."

A member of the French assimilationist tradition, Zemmour has strongly opposed mass immigration, and the current model of integrating immigrants which he considers to have been too lenient, for a long time. In November 2008, he gave an interview to the monthly Le Choc du mois where he compared immigration to a "demographic tsunami". In 2007 he also came out in favour of the Thierry Mariani amendment, which would require genetic tests in order to qualify for family reunification.

At a public meeting in Lille in October 2021, Zemmour reiterated his position on migrants, calling for an end to illegal and legal immigration in France.

==== Race and anti-racism issues ====
Zemmour says he would like to put on trial the anti-racism of the 1980s, which he considers, along with feminism, to be a "bien-pensant cause" derived from the "milieu of French and Western pseudo-elites" that the people will not follow in the least. He says that it was especially after having "read Pierre-André Taguieff" who is known for his positions and work on the Nouvelle Droite and anti-racism that he "understood that anti-racist progressivism was the successor of communism, with the same totalitarian methods developed by the Comintern during the 1930s".

According to him, anti-racism is a tactic initiated by François Mitterrand to make people forget the left's turn to economic liberalism in 1983. He claims that anti-racism is an ideology implemented by former leftists who had had to give up their illusions. With immigrants, these people had found a kind of alternative revolutionary people.

==== Feminism, women and homosexuality ====
Zemmour has expressed criticism of feminism and homosexuality, and has claimed that France's decline had partly been caused by the erosion of virility, and the "feminization" of society, themes he has explored at length in Le Premier Sexe and The Suicide of France. Zemmour called the legalization of abortion a "collective suicide" and has argued that women were unsuited to positions of political power. In The Suicide of France, he expressed criticism of birth control, women's rights, and gender studies. He has also defended Dominique Strauss-Kahn and Tariq Ramadan in relation to accusations of sexual assault levelled against them.

A number of op-ed pieces have labelled his positions as misogynistic.

Zemmour defends himself from such allegations, stating that he instead believes himself to be "the greatest defender of women". In televised debates and during his presidential campaign he has often taken this position, arguing that he is the sole candidate to defend women from Islam, especially from the compulsion to wear veils under many modern interpretations of Sharia law.

=== Economic policy ===
Zemmour's diagnosis of the current economic state of France precedes his positions on various economic issues, and in particular questions of fiscal policy and free trade. He says that France is "world champion in everything" in this regard, with 30% of GDP for social protection, 56% for public spending and 47% for compulsory contributions, such as direct taxes and various other social contributions. He also says that France's budget massively helps foreigners and immigrants, who benefit for example from 42% of the social redistribution of the national Family Allowance Fund.

Zemmour declared in that regard that he will stop all kind of aid and subsidies to foreigners, and claims that this will bring 20 to 30 billion euros yearly savings to the French budget. In particular, he also advocates abolishing state medical aid for foreigners, which costs 1 billion euros per year to the state budget. Zemmour has called the French state a "bureaucratic hell" and advocates administrative simplification.

Rather anti-liberal with regards to free trade, he opposes European federalism and the European Union, which he considers to be clearly in favour of the free movement of goods and in deep conflict with the French social model. According to him, because of the European Union, the left, like the right, must apply "the same economic policy, social liberalism or liberal socialism" because, in the words of Philippe Séguin, "right and left are retailers of the same wholesaler, Europe". Zemmour supports protectionism. He proposes the retirement age be raised to 64.

==== Taxes and social contributions ====
Zemmour wants to lower corporate taxes. He has proposed to reduce the CSG (general social contribution) from 9% to 2.5%, for employees who have a modest salary, from the minimum wage up to 2,000 euros. Eric Zemmour thus judges that this would make a salary increase of a monthly minimum wage over the year.

In order both not to reduce the social protection model of the French and to finance this tax cut, he wants "national solidarity to become national again", and has proposed that non-contributory social expenditure (family allowances, housing allowances, minimum old-age allowance, minimum living allowance) be withdrawn from foreigners and are reserved for the French. According to him, this represents 20 billion savings for the national budget.

==== Euro and free trade issues ====
While Zemmour has advocated France dropping the Euro currency, he no longer supports this idea, which he believes would have more disadvantages than advantages at this stage. He rather prefers to concentrate on free trade issues, in order to stop free trade treaties, and introduce import taxes on strategic products where France needs to defend its national interest, local production, and social model.

=== International relations ===
Zemmour has argued for a distancing of France from the United States, a closer relationship with Russia, as well as an increased independence from the European Union and its foreign policy. He has stated that the Normandy landings during World War II had been a liberation, but also a "colonization", of France by the United States. Zemmour has also called for a strengthening of the French Armed Forces, arguing that the only influence that France has retained on the international scene was due to the strength of its armed forces and its nuclear defense capabilities. He supports a withdrawal from the NATO's integrated military command.

Zemmour supported Brexit and Britain's vote to leave the European Union, describing the EU as a "pure technostructure that has got rid of the people," but has said that he would not seek to fully withdraw France from the EU if elected president, arguing that France's war record made it harder for the country to follow Britain's example. Instead, Zemmour has summed up his position as "I want France to be in Europe, but I want France to come before Europe," and pledged to withdraw France from the EU's immigration and asylum policies, put French law above EU law and halt accession talks with Eastern European countries aiming to join the bloc.

Zemmour has expressed support for Rattachism, the integration of Wallonia, the French-speaking part of Belgium, into France, pointing to a 2010 opinion poll in which 49 per cent of Walloons were ready for such a move. He described Belgium as having become largely a fiction, and likened its separation from France to that of East Germany from West Germany, calling it "France's GDR".

Zemmour condemned Russia's 2022 invasion of Ukraine despite his previous pro-Russia stance.

After the 2023 Israel-Gaza War, Zemmour described the conflict as the "fight of our civilisation", called for a ban on Hamas's parent organisation, the Muslim Brotherhood, in France, and visited Israel in support for the war efforts against the designated terrorist group Hamas. Following the June 2025 Israeli strikes on Iran, Zemmour opposed calls for a ceasefire.

== Electoral history ==
=== 2022 French presidential election ===
Summary of the 10 April and 24 April 2022 French presidential election results
Candidate	Party		1st round 10 April 2022		2nd round 24 April 2022	
Candidate	Party		Votes	%	Votes	%
Emmanuel Macron	La République En Marche!	LREM	9,783,058	27.85	18,768,639	58.55
Marine Le Pen	National Rally	RN	8,133,828	23.15	13,288,686	41.45
Jean-Luc Mélenchon	La France Insoumise	LFI	7,712,520	21.95		
Éric Zemmour	Reconquête	R!	2,485,226	7.07		
Valérie Pécresse	The Republicans	LR	1,679,001	4.78		
Yannick Jadot	Europe Ecology – The Greens	EELV	1,627,853	4.63		
Jean Lassalle	Résistons!	RES	1,101,387	3.13		
Fabien Roussel	French Communist Party	PCF	802,422	2.28		
Nicolas Dupont-Aignan	Debout la France	DLF	725,176	2.06		
Anne Hidalgo	Socialist Party	PS	616,478	1.75		
Philippe Poutou	New Anticapitalist Party	NPA	268,904	0.77		
Nathalie Arthaud	Lutte Ouvrière	LO	197,094	0.56		
Total			35,132,947	100.00	32,057,325	100.00
Valid votes			35,132,947	97.80	32,057,325	91.34
Blank ballots			543,609	1.51	2,233,904	6.37
Invalid ballots			247,151	0.69	805,249	2.29
Turnout			35,923,707	73.69	35,096,478	71.99
Not voted			12,824,169	26.31	13,655,861	28.01
Registered voters			48,747,876		48,752,339	
Source: Minister of the Interior

Vote share – 1st round
Emmanuel Macron	27.85%
Marine Le Pen	23.15%
Jean-Luc Mélenchon	21.95%
Éric Zemmour	7.07%
Valérie Pécresse	4.78%
Yannick Jadot	4.63%
Jean Lassalle	3.13%
Fabien Roussel	2.28%
Nicolas Dupont-Aignan	2.06%
Anne Hidalgo	1.75%
Philippe Poutou	0.77%
Nathalie Arthaud	0.56%

=== 2022 French legislative elections ===
2022 French legislative election: Var's 4th constituency
Party	Candidate	Votes	%	±%
LREM (Ensemble)	Sereine Mauborgne	14,735	28.51	-3.79
RN	Philippe Lottiaux	12,784	24.74	−0.02
REC	Eric Zemmour	11,983	23.19	N/A
LFI (NUPÉS)	Sabine Cristofani-Viglione	6,649	12.87	+0.88
LR (UDC)	Marie-Christine Hamel	2,454	4.75	−13.12
DIV	Chantal Sarrut	1,205	2.33	
Others	N/A	1,671	3.62	N/A
Turnout		51,681	46.66	+3.87
2nd round result
RN	Philippe Lottiaux	25,581	53.65	+8.30
LREM (Ensemble)	Sereine Mauborgne	22,098	46.35	−8.30
Turnout		47,679	44.89	+7.89
RN gain from LREM				

== Controversies and conflicts with opponents ==
The subjects Zemmour addresses, as well as the positions he defends, have earned him some strong opponents and equally strong supporters. According to an article by François Dufay, La fronde des intellos (literal translation: "The upheaval of the intellectuals"), in the June 2002 edition of Le Point, Jean-Marie Le Pen reportedly said that "[the] only three journalists who behave properly with respect to [him]" are Élisabeth Lévy, Éric Zemmour and Serge Moati. Zemmour noted during an interview: "I think he meant that with an ironic wink: it refers to his famous declaration fifteen years ago that caused such a scandal when he criticised Elkabbach, Levaï, who were all Jewish, and you will note that the three who he noted treat him well are also all Jewish. [...] And he knows that quite well, and everyone knows that quite well".

Following a number of controversies after a talk show on Arte dedicated to miscegenation on 13 November 2008, as a result of his comments on races (that blacks and whites belonged to two different races and that this difference was discernible by skin colour, without ranking them hierarchically), Zemmour also published a reply in the magazine Vendredi. Faced with the criticism caused by the views expressed by Éric Zemmour during the show, the deputy manager of programmes for the Arte channel distanced himself from these words but explained that nothing said was illegal. (Note: "I did not think he would express himself in such a clumsy way! Our channel, of course, is not associated with Zemmour's views. We checked with our legal services to see if these statements fell within the scope of the law. This does not seem to be the case. The important thing is that these words were disputed on set.... we will think twice before inviting him again!")

On 25 March 2009, he filed a complaint against the French rapper Youssoupha for "criminal threats and public abuse" after the uploading of the song "Because of saying it" in which Zemmour was attacked ad hominem: "Because of judging our faces, people know, that talking heads often demonise the ghetto-dwellers, each time it blows up they say it's us, I put a price on the head of the one who silences this asshole Éric Zemmour". The rapper had clarified in a previous interview in the newspaper Le Parisien that he was not advocating silencing Zemmour by force, but rather by argument. (Note: "Silencing, it means putting him in his place. (...) The words do not refer to murder, or aggression, or injuries... I did not want to either have him killed or to deprive him of his freedom of expression. Silencing, it means to put him in his place, to expose him to his own contradictions".) The album was released on 12 October 2009, with an expurgated version of the controversial track in which Zemmour's name is scrambled out. On 26 October 2011, Zemmour won his suit against the rapper and the director general of EMI Music France, Valérie Queinnec.

On 5 March 2011, some voices were raised against Zemmour and called for Rémy Pflimlin, the CEO of France Télévisions, to suspend Zemmour's collaboration with France 2, (Note: The president of SOS Racisme, Dominique Sopo, wrote him a letter and demanded sanctions, after which it was the turn of the General Confederation of Labour to demand a reaction from Pfimlin.) which he refused to do, explaining: ""The public service is attached to humanist and republican values, but it is also the place where the diversity of opinions is expressed within the legal framework", he reminds those around him urging him to suspend Éric Zemmour's collaboration with France 2".

On 17 November 2015, four days after the 13 November 2015 Paris terrorist attacks, Zemmour stated on RTL: "Instead of bombing Raqqa, France should bomb Molenbeek from which the Friday 13 commandos came". This caused outrage in Belgium. In a 24 March 2016 column, Zemmour added: "Molenbeeks, France is full of them. France creates them in abundance".

On 18 September 2018, controversy arose over his opinion about the first name of columnist Hapsatou Sy on the TV programme Les terriens du dimanche hosted by Thierry Ardisson. His words "It's your first name that is an insult to France", adding "first names embody the history of France" were cut at the editing of the show but rebroadcast by Sy. She then asked him "What would you like my name to be?" to which he answered "Corinne, that would suit you very well". She decided to file a complaint against Zemmour.

In 2020, whilst commenting on footage that showed four policemen hitting a black man in Paris, Zemmour responded to accusations of racism levelled at the involved policemen by saying "I can hardly see [them] getting up in the morning and telling themselves: 'Here, I'm going to endanger my career and I'm going to hit a black guy'", although he recognised "that does not mean that they were right" to do what they did. He also questioned the victim's judicial history.

In September 2021, in his book La France n'a pas dit son dernier mot, Zemmour states Seine-Saint-Denis—the northern suburbs of Paris known for their large Muslim population—has become a "foreign enclave under the reign of Allah", a remark which angered local politicians.

On 11 September 2021, Zemmour's declaration about the 2012 Toulouse and Montauban shootings (Note: "The family of Mohammed Merah asked to bury him on the land of his ancestors in Algeria. It was also known that the Jewish children murdered in front of the denominational school in Toulouse would be buried in Israel. Anthropologists have taught us that we are from the country where we are buried. Assassins or innocents, executioners or victims, enemies or friends, they wanted to live in France, (...) but when it comes to leaving their bones, they especially did not choose France, foreigners above all".) caused controversy among Jewish communities in France.

=== Remarks about Vichy France and the Holocaust ===
Zemmour generated controversy by claiming that "Vichy [France] protected French Jews and gave the foreign Jews [to the Nazis]" in a 2021 interview with CNews. His statements in the interview polarized the French Jewish community, and were criticized by many Jewish leaders and intellectuals. In response to Zemmour's comment, the chief rabbi of France, Haïm Korsia, called Zemmour an antisemite and a racist. On 2 April 2025, Zemmour was fined 10,000 Euros for repeating the claim. In 2022, Zemmour claimed that French homosexuals were not imprisoned and sent to concentration camps, resulting in a lawsuit by gay rights groups.

=== Accusations of sexual harassment ===
In May 2021, Zemmour was publicly accused of inappropriate sexual behaviour by several women, but no judicial proceedings followed.

=== Wikipedia page manipulation ===
In February 2022, a shadow group working covertly within the digital division of Zemmour's campaign team was organized to alter articles at French Wikipedia in order to promote his profile. The "WikiZedia" team attempted to repeatedly rewrite Zemmour's Wikipedia article, made him "as visible as possible" by inserting links and quotations from him on other articles, and engaged in historical negationism to promote Zemmour's discredited assertion that the Vichy government had tried to rescue French Jews from the Nazis.

After they were discovered, and Zemmour's director of digital strategy confirmed his team's efforts, administrators at French Wikipedia banned seven editors, including a 15-year veteran who was a respected contributor.

=== "Francicised names" website controversy ===
During his campaign for the 2022 presidential elections, a website where people could type in their name and get an allegedly "French" version of it assigned to them was created. This was made to mock Zemmour's views on the idea of France gradually losing its "real" French roots.

== Legal cases ==
As of 2022, Zemmour has been convicted once in France for provoking racial discrimination in 2011, and once for hatred against Muslims in 2018 as well as once for inciting racial hatred for 2022. He did not appeal his 2011 conviction, but appealed on 5 December 2019 the 2018 conviction to the European Court of Human Rights on the basis of article 10 of the European Convention on Human Rights protecting freedom of expression. The ECHR upheld his conviction.

=== Convictions ===
==== 2010: Incitement of racial discrimination ====
The International League against Racism and Anti-Semitism (LICRA) decided to launch legal proceedings against Éric Zemmour for his views after the 6 March 2010 broadcast of Salut les Terriens presented by Thierry Ardisson, where he promoted his book Mélancolie française. He declared during the show that: "French people with an immigrant background were profiled because most traffickers are Blacks and Arabs. ... It is a fact." The same day, he asserted on France Ô that employers "had the right to refuse Arabs or blacks". (Note: The Club Averroes and the MRAP submitted the case to the Conseil supérieur de l'audiovisuel after the legal proceedings brought by the LICRA. Éric Zemmour was supported by several personalities, including the founder of Reporters Without Borders, journalist and right-wing Mayor of Béziers, Robert Ménard.)

On 23 March 2010, he wrote a letter to the LICRA explaining his views. In this letter he particularly observed the views of Christian Delorme before a parliamentary commission of the Senate. He cited the book L'Islam dans les prisons by Farhad Khosrokhavar, who confirmed the figure of 70 or 80% of "Muslims in prison" estimated in a survey commissioned by the Ministry of Justice. Following this letter, the International League against Racism and Anti-Semitism (LICRA) decided to withdraw its legal proceedings against Éric Zemmour.

On 30 March 2010, Éric Zemmour was summoned by SOS Racisme to appear in court on 29 June 2010, where he "will have to answer for the offense of racial defamation and incitement to racial hatred." (Note: Meanwhile, these views and the trial were given international scope by an article devoted to them and to Zemmour in The New York Times in February 2011.) During the trial, Zemmour received testimony in his favour from journalist Robert Ménard, his fellow columnist Éric Naulleau, writer Denis Tillinac, politician Claude Goasguen and essayist Xavier Raufer.

On 18 February 2011, in a first judgment, the 17th chamber of the court of Paris acquitted Zemmour of the offense of defamation for the remarks on the traffickers. These words may be "shocking", writes the court, but they are not "defamatory". He was given a 1,000 euros fine, suspended for having, on France Ô, "justified an illegal discriminatory practice – discrimination in hiring – by presenting it as lawful". (Note: Moreover, in addition to the fine, the first judgment sentenced him to pay €1,000 in damages and interest and €2,000 in legal costs to each of the three organisations (totalling €9,000) and the second sentenced him to pay one euro to each of the civil parties and €750 in legal costs (totalling €1,502)) In a second judgment, the 17th chamber only retained the offense of incitement of racial discrimination and sentenced Zemmour to a suspended fine of 1,000 euros. (Note: He must also pay 1 euro to each of the civil parties, plus 750 euros in legal costs, for a total of 1,502 euros. The two judgments will finally have to be published in the press.)

On 2 March 2011, invited by Hervé Novelli and given an ovation by the members of Parliament from the Union for a Popular Movement at the national convention of The Reformers, Zemmour suggested doing away with the laws on racial discrimination, the memorial laws, prosecutions by anti-racist organisations and subsidies to them in a speech to UMP members of Parliament.

==== 2018: Incitement of religious hatred towards Muslims ====
In the 6 September 2016 episode of the programme C à vous on France 5, while promoting the launch of his book Un quinquennat pour rien, Zemmour stated that Muslims should be given the choice "between Islam and France" and that "all Muslims, whether they say it or not", consider jihadists to be "good Muslims".

On the 3 May 2018, the Court of appeal reckoned that these passages do not contain "any exhortation, even implicit, to incitement of hatred". The court gave him a 5,000 euro fine for incitement to religious hatred, and one euro in damages to the association Coordination des appels pour une paix juste au Proche-Orient - EuroPalestine and 3,000 euros for the legal costs. The court considered Zemmour's statements to "aim at Muslims in their entirety and constituted an implicit exhortation to discrimination", when he claimed that France had been experiencing "an invasion for thirty years" and that a "struggle to Islamise a territory" was taking place "in the countless French banlieus where many young women are veiled", "a jihad".

On 17 September 2019, the Cour de cassation, bringing against him the charges of "an implicit exhortation to discrimination" and "a call for discrimination", rejected his appeal, making his condamnation on appeal definitive in domestic law.

On 5 December 2019, Zemmour complained to the European Court of Human Rights (ECHR) on the basis of article 10 of the European Convention on Human Rights which protects freedom of expression. His appeal was rejected by the ECHR in December 2022. In its ruling the court said that Zemmour had "duties and responsibilities" as a journalist and was aware of the scope and consequences of his words on a television program. It also said that he sought to "stoke a rift between the French and the Muslim community as a whole,"

==== 2022: Inciting racial hatred ====
On 17 January 2022, Zemmour was found guilty by a Paris court for inciting racial hatred during a TV programme on the French channel CNews in September 2020. He was fined €10,000 for comments about child migrants.

=== Acquittals ===
He was acquitted six times of similar charges, in 2008, 2014 (twice), 2016, 2017 and 2019. Convictions in 2015 and 2020 were overturned on appeal.

==== 2008: Legal case related to his novel ====
In 2008, following the publication of his novel Petit Frère, in which a Jew is attacked by a young North African in a parking lot, Zemmour admits to having been inspired by a news item that occurred five years earlier: the murder of Sébastien Selam by Adel Amastaibou. Selam was a childhood friend and next door neighbour of Amastaibou. Zemmour was sued by the family of Selam who demanded the book be banned. According to the family lawyer, in the novel, the victim is described as a "bad Jew, his mother defamed and his grandfather accused of the worst evils". Zemmour won the case.

==== 2014: Alleged Incitement of racial hatred ====
The Representative Council of Black Associations (CRAN) filed a complaint with the Superior Audiovisual Council (CSA) about a column by Zemmour aired on 6 May 2014 on RTL. As a result, CSA "strongly warned" RTL on 17 June, judging that Zemmour's remarks "were likely to encourage discriminatory behavior towards the population groups specifically named, and to be capable of inciting hatred or violence against them". The comments by Zemmour that were the subject of the complaint were these:

Our territory, deprived of the protection of its ancient frontiers, is now seeing a revival in the cities, but also in the countryside, of the great raids and pillaging of the past. The Normans, the Huns, the Arabs, the great invasions after the fall of Rome have now been replaced by bands of Chechens, Roma, Kosovars, Maghrebis, Africans, who rob, assault, or steal. (Note: Notre territoire, privé de la protection de ses anciennes frontières, renoue dans les villes, mais aussi dans les campagnes, avec les grandes razzias, les pillages d'autrefois. Les Normands, les Huns, les Arabes, les grandes invasions d'après la chute de Rome sont désormais remplacées par des bandes de Tchétchènes, de Roms, de Kosovars, de Maghrébins, d'Africains, qui dévalisent, violentent ou dépouillent.)

— Eric Zemmour, via RTL

The CSA also considered that RTL, "by allowing the broadcasting of these remarks, had failed in their obligation to maintain control of the broadcast", recalling that the column had been communicated to station managers beforehand by its author. Prosecuted for "incitement to racial hatred" for these comments, Zemmour was released in September 2015 by the Correctional tribunal (Note: In France, the correctional tribunal is a specialized chamber of the judicial court ruling in first instance (as a lower court) in criminal matters on offences defined as felonies (Délit pénal) and for which the prison sentence may not exceed ten years.) in Paris, which ruled that "as excessive, shocking or provocative as these comments may seem", they apply "only to a fraction of the targeted communities and not to them as a whole". The Court of Appeal confirmed the acquittal on 22 June 2016.

==== 2014: Remarks about Muslims ====
On 30 October 2014, he told the Italian newspaper Corriere della Sera: "Muslims have their civil code, it is the Koran. They live among themselves, in the outskirts. The French were forced to leave". The journalist then asks him: "But don't you think that it is unrealistic to think that we take millions of people, we put them on planes to get rid of them?" Zemmour replied, "I know, it's unrealistic, but the story is surprising. Who would have said in 1940 that a million pieds-noirs, twenty years later, would have left Algeria to return to France? Or that after the war five or six million Germans would have abandoned central and eastern Europe where they had lived for centuries?" On 17 December 2015, Zemmour was sentenced at first instance to a fine of €3,000, for inciting hatred against Muslims.

The conviction was confirmed by the Paris Court of Appeal on 17 November. In January 2018, the Cour de Cassation overturned the conviction. Zemmour was released on 29 November 2018, by the Paris Court of Appeal, the judges considering that "it is not proven that Eric Zemmour, prosecuted as an interviewee, knew that this newspaper was published in France".

==== 2016: Defamation on Cécile Duflot ====
On 12 May 2016, Zemmour declared on RTL that by publishing Denis Baupin's telephone exchanges, "Mediapart violated all the rules of respect for private life" and that these journalists are "also and above all the consenting instruments of Cécile Duflot's political revenge against Emmanuelle Cosse, Denis Baupin's companion, who betrayed her for a ministerial dish of lentils". Zemmour was sued for defamation by Duflot, but on 6 February 2018, the Paris Criminal Court released him, finding that his allegations against Cécile Duflot were not defamatory.

==== 2017: Sanctions imposed by media watchdog agency canceled ====
On 2 February 2017, Zemmour declared on RTL: "Non-discrimination is misrepresented as a synonym of equality whereas over time it has become a machine to disintegrate the Nation, the family, society in the name of the rights of an individual king". On 14 June 2017, RTL was put on formal notice by the High Audiovisual Council (CSA), France's media watchdog agency, for having broadcast "praise of discrimination" without any "contradiction or putting into perspective". On 15 October 2018, the Conseil d'Etat cancelled the decision of the CSA.

=== Pending court ruling ===
==== 2019: Alleged Incitement to hatred of Muslims ====
On 25 September 2020, the Paris court sentenced Zemmour to a fine of 10,000 euros for "insult and incitement to hatred", because of the comments he had made in September 2019 during a speech to the against Muslims and immigration, at the opening of the right-wing convention organised by relatives of Marion Maréchal. In its judgment, the court said that, "by distinguishing among the French all the Muslims opposed to the 'ethnic French' and by designating them, as well as the Muslim immigrants living in France, not only as criminals perpetrators of the terrorist attacks of 2015 but like former colonized people who became colonizers", the remarks made "constitute an exhortation, sometimes implicit and sometimes explicit, to discrimination and hatred towards the Muslim community and its religion". (Note: Éric Zemmour was also ordered to pay one euro in damages and 1,500 euros for legal costs to eight civil party associations, including the Human Rights League (LDH) and SOS Racisme.)

Zemmour appealed. The appeal hearing took place on 2 June 2021. The Paris Court of Appeal acquitted him on 8 September 2021. In the reasons for its judgment, the court of appeal ruled that "none of the statements pursued target all Africans, immigrants or Muslims but only fractions of these groups". "There is no justification for remarks targeting a group of people as a whole because of their origin or their belonging or not belonging to a particular ethnicity, nation, race or religion," the court added, "from where it follows that the prosecuted offenses are not constituted." The general prosecutor's office has filed a cassation appeal, which is pending.

== Prizes ==
- 2010 Prix de la Liberté d'expression (Enquête & Débat)
- 2010 Prix du livre incorrect
- 2011 Prix Richelieu (Association de Défense de la langue française)
- 2015 Prix Combourg-Chateaubriand (Académie Chateaubriand), for The French Suicide

== Publications ==
=== Non-fiction ===
- 1995: Balladur, immobile à grands pas, Grasset ISBN 978-2-246-48971-9
- 1998: Le Livre noir de la droite, Grasset et Fasquelle ISBN 978-2-246-56251-1
- 1998: Le Coup d'État des juges, Grasset et Fasquelle ISBN 978-2-246-52551-6
- 1998: Une certaine idée de la France, collectif, France-Empire ISBN 978-2-7048-0872-4
- 2000: Les Rats de garde, in collaboration with Patrick Poivre d'Arvor, Stock ISBN 978-2-234-05217-8
- 2002: L'Homme qui ne s'aimait pas, Balland ISBN 978-2-7158-1408-0
- 2006: Le premier sexe, Denoël, ISBN 978-2-207-25744-9 – republished J'ai lu, 2009
- 2010: Mélancolie française, Fayard /Denoël ISBN 978-2-213-65450-8 – republished Le Livre de Poche, 2011.
- 2011: Z comme Zemmour, Le Cherche midi ISBN 978-2-7491-1865-9
- 2012: Le Bûcher des vaniteux, Albin Michel ISBN 9782226240248
- 2013: Le Bûcher des vaniteux 2, Albin Michel ISBN 9782226245410
- 2014: Le Suicide français, Albin Michel ISBN 9782226254757
- 2016: Un quinquennat pour rien, Albin Michel ISBN 9782226320087
- 2018: Destin français, Albin Michel ISBN 9782226320070
- 2021: La France n'a pas dit son dernier mot, Rubempré ISBN 9782957930500 (translation of title: France has not said its last word)
- 2023: Je n'ai pas dit mon dernier mot, Rubempré ISBN 9782957930524
- 2025: La messe n'est pas dite : Pour un sursaut judéo-chrétien, Fayard ISBN 9782213734224

=== Novels ===
- 1999: Le Dandy rouge, Plon ISBN 978-2-259-19058-9
- 2004: L'Autre, Denoël ISBN 978-2-207-25496-7
- 2008: Petit Frère, Denoël ISBN 978-2-207-25668-8 – republished J'ai lu, 2009

== See also ==
- Björn Höcke
- Le Premier Sexe (2006)
  - Sexe et Dévoiement (2006)
- The Suicide of France (2014)
  - The Death of the West (2001)
  - Germany Abolishes Itself (2010)
