= Feminization (sociology) =

Shift in cultural norms

In sociology, feminization is the shift in gender roles and sex roles in a society, group, or organization towards a focus upon the feminine. It can also mean the incorporation of women into a group or a profession that was once dominated by men.

== Examples of feminization in society ==
- Feminization of education – Majority female teachers, a female majority of students in higher education and a curriculum which is better suited to the learning process of women.
- Feminization of the workplace – Lower paying female-dominated occupations such as (1) food preparation, food-serving and other food-related occupations, and (2) personal care and service.
- Feminization of smoking – The phrase torches of freedom is emblematic of the phenomenon of tobacco shifting from being seen as a male activity to also a feminine one. See women and smoking for a comprehensive treatment of this topic.

== Definition of feminization ==
Feminization has two basic meanings. The first concerns a person who was not initially feminine but becomes feminine later in their life through the perceptions of both the individual and those around them. According to gender theorist Judith Butler, a person's gender is not solely an act of will or self-description, as it is also shaped by the people who describe, categorize, and treat the person according to their own perceptions of their gender.

The second meaning of the term feminization describes when a person who originally had feminine qualities begins to incorporate more feminine attributes into their personality in some way, shape, or form. The term has often been used to describe females. Over time, it shifted to where the term can be used to describe the process of someone or something becoming more feminine, by adopting feminine qualities.

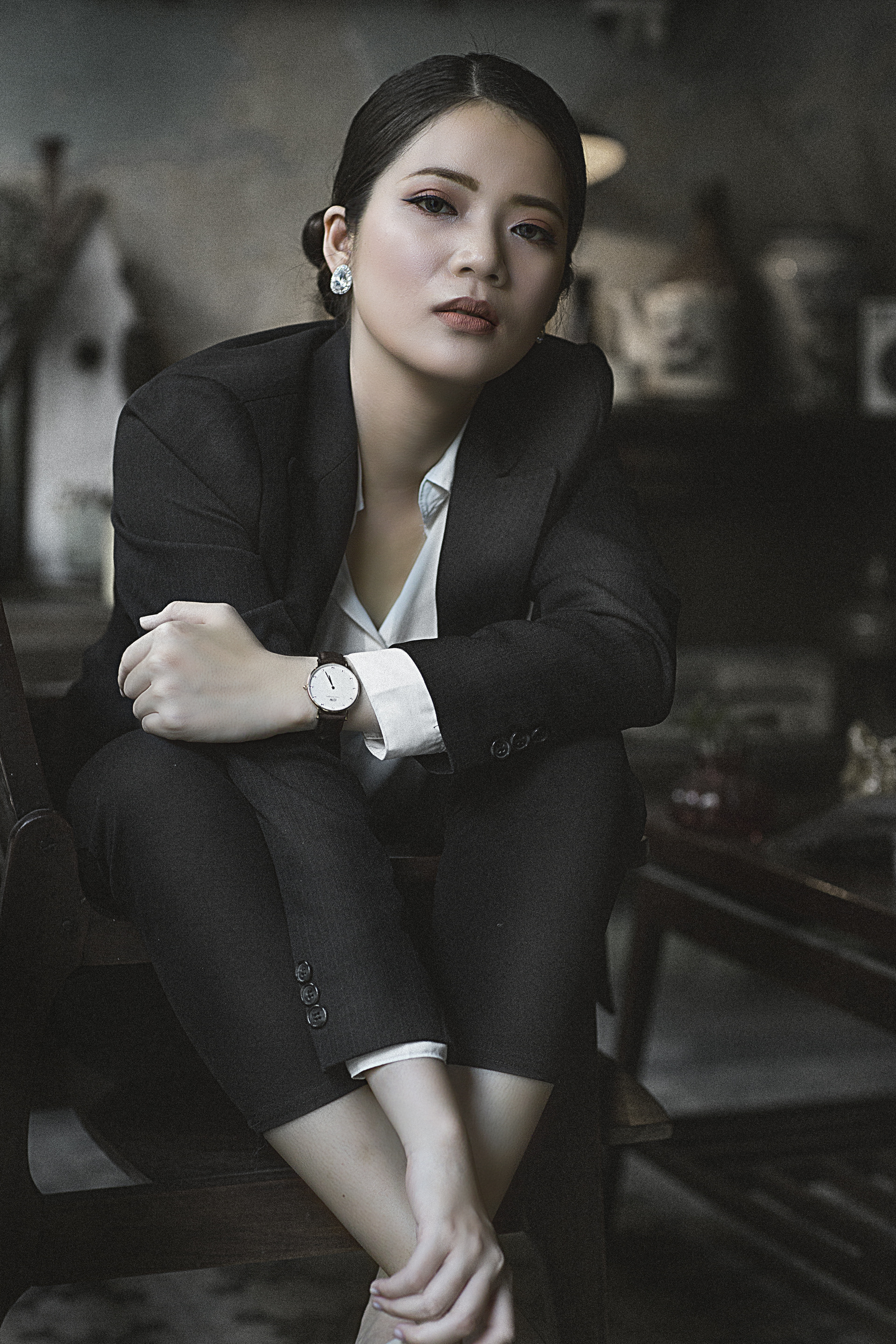
A woman in a suit

== Feminization of poverty ==
Women are more likely than men to live below the poverty line, a phenomenon known as the feminization of poverty. The 2015 poverty rates for men and women in the U.S. were 10% and 15% respectively. Women are less likely to pursue advanced degrees (this is outdated, women are now a growing majority) and tend to have low paying jobs. There is a gender pay gap: even with the same level of education and occupational role, women earn much less than men, though research suggests this is largely due to women working fewer hours than men overall for reasons such as caring for children or lifestyle factors, rather than direct discrimination.

== Feminization of the labor force ==
Feminization of the labor force in present-day associations is inescapable in that females make up half of the labor force and the revelation of them as a potential profitable asset. Post-war, there have been considerable advances in balancing the workforce when comparing women and men's job status and pay rates in the North America and Europe economies.

== Works ==
- Le Premier Sexe (The First Sex), a 2006 book from French writer, journalist and essayist Éric Zemmour.
