= Declinism =

Belief that something is tending towards decline

Declinism is the belief that a society or institution is tending towards decline. Particularly, it is the predisposition, caused by cognitive biases such as rosy retrospection, to view the past more favourably and the future more negatively.

"The great summit of declinism" according to Adam Gopnik, "was established in 1918, in the book that gave decline its good name in publishing: the German historian Oswald Spengler's best-selling, thousand-page work The Decline of the West."

== History ==
The belief has been traced back to Edward Gibbon's work The History of the Decline and Fall of the Roman Empire, published between 1776 and 1788, which argues that the Roman Empire collapsed because of the gradual loss of civic virtue among its citizens, who became lazy, spoiled and inclined to hire foreign mercenaries to handle the defence of state. He believed that reason must triumph over superstition to save Europe's great powers from a similar fate to the Roman Empire.

Spengler's book The Decline of the West, which gave declinism its popular name, was released in the aftermath of World War I and captured the pessimistic spirit of the times. Spengler wrote that history had seen the rise and fall of several "civilizations" (including the Egyptian, the Classical, the Chinese and the Mesoamerican). He claimed that they go in cycles, typically spanning 1,000 years. Spengler believed that Western civilization is in a decline that is inevitable.

The idea that Western civilization is declining has been a common historical constant, often repeating variations on the same themes. Historian Arthur L. Herman, in the introduction to his book The Idea of Decline in Western History, wrote that:

... intellectuals have been predicting the imminent collapse of Western civilization for more than one hundred and fifty years ... Yet when I point this out as evidence that, to paraphrase Mark Twain, reports of the demise of the West might be greatly exaggerated, I usually meet with strong skepticism.

== Cause ==
Declinism has been described as "a trick of the mind" and as "an emotional strategy, something comforting to snuggle up to when the present day seems intolerably bleak."

One factor in declinism is the reminiscence bump in which older people tend "to best remember events that happened to them at around the ages of 10-30." As one source puts it, "[t]he vibrancy of youth, and the thrill of experiencing things for the first time, creates a 'memory bump' compared with which later life does seem a bit drab." Gopnik suggests that "the idea of our decline is emotionally magnetic, because life is a long slide down, and the plateau just passed is easier to love than the one coming up." Citing the widespread love of "old songs," he writes: "The long look back is part of the long ride home. We all believe in yesterday."

Another factor is the positivity effect in which "as people get older, they tend to experience fewer negative emotions, and they're more likely to remember positive things over negative things."

Both factors can lead people to experience declinism but so, contrarily, can negativity bias in which "emotionally negative events are likely to have more impact on your thoughts and behaviours than a similar, but positive, event."

== Function ==
Alan W. Dowd quotes Samuel P. Huntington as saying that declinism "performs a useful historical function" in that it "provides a warning and a goad to action in order to head off and reverse the decline that it says is taking place." Dowd himself agrees, saying that declinism at its best "is an expression of the American tendency toward self-criticism and continual improvement."

Josef Joffe, on the contrary, emphasizes the fact "that obsessively fretting about your possible decline can be a good way to produce it." Similarly, Robert Kagan has expressed concern that Americans are "in danger of committing pre-emptive superpower suicide out of a misplaced fear of their own declining power."

Barbara MacQuade argues that declinism is a central tactic of authoritarians, who spread disinformation about a bleak future to then appeal to nostalgia and tradition to build support.

== Late 1800s ==
The late 1800s (also called the fin de siècle) has been described as the time when "the image of Western decline first took decisive shape". It was widely thought to be a period of social degeneracy, with people hoping for a new beginning. The "spirit" of fin de siècle often refers to the cultural hallmarks that were recognized as prominent in the 1880s and 1890s, including ennui, cynicism, pessimism, and "a widespread belief that civilization leads to decadence". In Britain, this triggered the "first serious burst of declinism" in governmental economic policy.

The major political theme of the era was that of revolt against materialism, rationalism, positivism, bourgeois society, and liberal democracy. The fin-de-siècle generation supported emotionalism, irrationalism, subjectivism, and vitalism, while the mindset of the age saw civilization as being in a crisis that required a massive and total solution. The themes of fin de siècle political culture were very controversial and have been cited as a major influence on fascism and as a generator of the science of geopolitics, including the theory of Lebensraum.

== American declinism ==
The United States, in particular, has a history of predicting its own downfall, beginning with European settlement. The so-called "American declinism" has been a recurring topic in the politics of the United States since the 1950s.

"America is prone to bouts of 'declinism,'" The Economist has noted.

In their 2011 book That Used to Be Us, Thomas L. Friedman and Michael Mandelbaum argued that the United States was in the midst of "its fifth wave of Declinism." The first had come "with the 'Sputnik Shock' of 1957," the second with the Vietnam War, the third with President Jimmy Carter's "malaise" and the rise of Japan, the fourth with the ascendancy of China.

American declinism can suddenly overtake commentators who had previously taken a sanguine view of the country's prospects. Robert Kagan has noted, for example, that the pundit Fareed Zakaria, who in 2004 "described the United States as enjoying a 'comprehensive uni-polarity' unlike anything seen since Rome", had by 2008 begun "writing about the 'post-American world' and 'the rise of the rest.'"

In a piece which appeared in The Nation on 13 June 2017, the author Tom Engelhardt claimed that Donald Trump was America's "first declinist candidate for president".

== European declinism ==
The theory of declinism had been noted in the United Kingdom. In a 2015 survey, 70% of Britons surveyed agreed with the statement that "things are worse than they used to be," even though at the time Britons were in fact "richer, healthier and longer-living than ever before". However, it was also noted in the survey that many of the things that older people mourned from their youths were no longer existent in modern society.

The British historian Robert Tombs suggested that the United Kingdom has faced several 'bouts' of declinism from as far back as the 1880s, when German competition in manufactured goods was first felt, and then again in the 1960s and 1970s, with economic worries, the rapid dissolution of the British Empire and a perception of dwindling power and influence in every field. Tombs however, concluded that "Declinism is at best a distortion of reality" and noted that Britain is still considered a great power by modern standards, even with the dissolution of empire. In the 1960s, social commentators interpreted The Beatles as a manifestation of social decline.

According to Alexander Stille, France has had a long tradition of books declaring its decline or death as early as the 18th century. Declinism has been described as a "booming industry" with popular authors such as Michel Onfray writing books and articles exploring failings of France and the West. French declinism has been related to the counter-Enlightenment of the early 19th century and to the late 1970s with the end of three decades of economic growth after World War II. In modern times, the phenomenon has picked up velocity and cut across the political spectrum with several variations of "déclinisme" emerging from Catholic reactionaries to nonreligious thinkers questioning national identity and political corruption.

Éric Zemmour's 2014 essay The French Suicide, which sold 500,000 copies in France, chronicles the supposed decline of the French nation-state and so has been associated with declinist literature.

== Declinist literature ==
Declinist literature includes:

- Oswald Spengler (1918). The Decline of the West. Oxford UP. ISBN 978-0-19-506751-4.
- Paul Kennedy (1987). The Rise and Fall of the Great Powers. Penguin Random. ISBN 0-394-54674-1.
- Fareed Zakaria (2008). The Post American World. W. W. Norton & Company. ISBN 9780393062359.
- Thilo Sarrazin (2010). Deutschland schafft sich ab. ISBN 978-3-7844-3592-3.
- Thomas L. Friedman; Michael Mandelbaum (2011). That Used to Be Us: How America Fell Behind in the World It Invented and How We Can Come Back. Macmillan. ISBN 9781429995115.
- Edward Luce (2012). Time to Start Thinking: America in the Age of Descent. Grove Press. ISBN 9780802194619.
- Éric Zemmour (2014). The French Suicide. Hachette. ISBN 978-2-226-25475-7.

== See also ==
- Ages of Man – Stages of human existence according to Greco-Roman mythology
- Chronological snobbery – View of past as inferior to the present
- Collapsology – Study of the risks of collapse of industrial civilization
- Conservatism – Political philosophy based on tradition
- Counter-Enlightenment – Intellectual stance against mainstream attitudes of the 18th-century Enlightenment
- Degeneration theory – Concept from the 18th and 19th centuries
- Democratic backsliding – Drift towards authoritarianism
- Dysgenics – Decrease in genetic traits deemed desirable
- Enshittification – Decline in online platform quality
- Historic recurrence – Repetition of similar events in history
- Misinformation – Incorrect or misleading information
- Palingenetic ultranationalism – Concept concerning generic fascism
- Renewalism
- Sensationalism – Type of editorial tactic used in mass media
- Social cycle theory – Type of social theories
- Societal collapse – Fall of a complex human society
- Yeridat ha-dorot – Concept in Rabbinic and Orthodox Judaism
