= The Suicide of France =

2014 essay by Éric Zemmour

- Author: Éric Zemmour
- Original title: Le Suicide français
- Language: French
- Genre: Non-fiction, politics
- Published: 1 October 2014
- Publisher: Éditions Albin Michel
- Publication place: France
- Pages: 534
- ISBN: 978-2-226-25475-7
- Text: The Suicide of France at Internet Archive (French)

The Suicide of France (French: Le Suicide français) is a 2014 essay by French far-right journalist Éric Zemmour. It argues that the French nation state has suffered a gradual decline since the 1970s, which Zemmour mainly attributes to the rise of immigration, feminism and egalitarianism, as well as the erosion of traditional values.

The book also contends that Vichy France attempted to protect French Jews during World War II, a theory that attracted widespread criticism. It has been associated with declinist literature by critics.

The book was a commercial success, selling more than 500,000 copies. It was translated into English by Nathan Pinkoski for American book publisher Encounter Books.

== Contents ==
The book is divided into seventy-nine short chapters. Each chapter is centered around a specific date and chronicles an individual episode (Note: According to Mark Lilla, "Zemmour does not transform them into a continuous narrative or even try to explain how they are connected.") of France's supposed decline, which serve as a backdrop for Zemmour's arguments. The first chapter centers on 9 November 1970, the date of Charles de Gaulle's death. Zemmour discusses a wide array of topics.

He expresses criticism of many developments that have affected French society and the French economy since the 1970s, including birth control, sexual liberation, women's right, gay rights, abortion, Muslim communitarianism, gender studies, monetary policy, the European Union, no-fault divorce, deconstruction and poststructuralism, privatization, the euro, American consumer capitalism, immigration from Africa, halal foods in schools, neoliberalism, and the end of conscription.

== Vichy France ==
In a series of chapters about Vichy France, Zemmour—who is Jewish—argued that Marshal Philippe Pétain's government attempted to save the French Jews during World War II, by choosing to sacrifice foreign Jews to the Nazi occupying power instead. Zemmour specifically attacked the work of historian Robert Paxton, whose scholarship, he claims, instilled a sense of collective guilt among the French people.

This theory attracted widespread criticism: critics noted that Zemmour's argument contradicted the mainstream scholarly understanding of Vichy France and was generally regarded as a fringe theory. The New York Times noted that Vichy France had sent more than 72,500 to their death and that "from 1942 onward, there is no evidence that the Vichy regime tried to protect French Jews. It collaborated with the Nazis to round up Jews, whether foreign or French." According to the BBC, Zemmour's ideas echoed the post-War illusory belief, now commonly referred to as the "sword and shield" theory, that Pétain and De Gaulle had been tacitly acting in concert to protect France.

Robert Paxton responded to Zemmour in an op-ed published in Le Monde.

== Reception ==
In a review for The New Yorker, Alexander Stille stated that "the central theme of Zemmour's argument is the death of the father, the end of a traditional, hierarchical, authoritarian society in which men were men, women were subordinate, gays were in the closet, and France was a world power". He criticized the book for repeating tropes of French declinist literature, and for using a structure that gives the illusion of causality between different events, without effectively proving it.

Stille also noted "an unsettling streak of misogyny" and an obsession with virility. He concluded that Zemmour overstates the decline of France, noting "France is no longer an empire, but it is a prosperous medium-sized country with an extremely high standard of living. ... France remains among the top twenty countries by virtually all measures of the World Bank's Human Development Index."

In the New York Review of Books, Mark Lilla called Zemmour a "demagogue", stirring proponents of right-wing politics "to an outraged hopelessness." He criticized the book for not establishing a clear connection between its different themes and only insinuating that the different topics are connected, as well as relying on affect. Lilla nevertheless explained the book's success, against the backdrop of terrorist attacks in France and reports of French youths leaving France to join ISIS. He also noted that some of Zemmour's ideas were "simply too eclectic to be labeled": for instance, The Suicide of France criticizes the corporate world for outsourcing jobs abroad and "pushing for full European integration", arguments that are similar to those of the left-wing antiglobalization movement.

In Le Monde, Luc Bronner argued that the book's commercial success was not so much a reflection of its quality, but of changes within French society, whose fears of "déclassement" and feelings of defeat were reflected in Zemmour's work. He also contended that the book's success rested on its ability to provide a clear and global explanation for France's woes, in a society that has trouble coming to terms with the world's complexity, and which lacks a collective project. Bronner also blamed the failures of the French educational system for the rising inequalities and the lack of opportunity experienced by a large part of the French population.

The book was the subject of a heated hour-long televised debate between Zemmour and journalists Aymeric Caron and Léa Salamé on the talk show On n'est pas couché on 6 October 2014. The debate has garnered 6.4 million views on YouTube as of 26 October 2024.

The accuracy of some of Zemmour's figures on immigration has been questioned. The book has been described by historian Michael Burleigh as a dramatization of Bat Ye'or's Eurabia thesis.

== See also ==
- The Death of the West (2001)
- Germany Abolishes Itself (2010)
- Traditionalist conservatism
- Opposition to immigration
- The Holocaust in France
