= Rolf Peter Sieferle =

German historian (1949–2016)

- Born: August 5, 1949; Stuttgart, West Germany
- Died: September 17, 2016 (aged 67); Heidelberg, Germany
- Occupation: Historian
- Known for: Finis Germania, The Underground Forest

Rolf Peter Sieferle (1949–2016) was a German historian known for applying the methodology of the social sciences to contemporary topics including ecological sustainability and social capital. He was a pioneer scholar of German environmental history. His work was wide ranging, addressing German conservatism around the period of the First World War, Karl Marx, and the fall of Communism. He was an advisor on climate change to the Angela Merkel government.

Sieferle came of age with the generation of 1968 as a youthful Socialist. By the 1990s, he was increasingly critical of what he viewed as naïve idealism. During the 2015 European migrant crisis, Sieferle wrote, "A society that can no longer distinguish between itself and the forces that would dissolve it is living morally beyond its means," causing the Frankfurter Allgemeine Zeitung to describe him as "embittered, humorless, ever more isolated". He committed suicide on 17 September 2016.

His Finis Germania became a bestseller following his death despite the fact that it has been denounced as an "extremist tract" and deemed antisemitic by the literary establishment.
