= Le Premier Sexe =

2006 book by Éric Zemmour

- Author: Éric Zemmour
- Publication date: 2006

Le Premier Sexe (The First Sex) is a book from writer, journalist and essayist Éric Zemmour published in 2006.

== Overview ==
In this book, Zemmour analyses what he considers to be the feminisation of society, or rather its devirilisation. Based on an array of examples from various fields, he denounces the movement from a patriarchal and traditional society to a modern and feminised one. Zemmour also examines economic and social consequences of this movement, before building upon this analysis to explain what founded the newly immigrated's behaviour.

Its title is a reference to the book The Second Sex (Le Deuxième Sexe) by Simone de Beauvoir.

== Publications ==
- 2006: Le Premier Sexe, Denoël, ISBN 978-2-207-25744-9
- 2009: Le Premier Sexe, J'ai lu, ISBN 978-2-207-25744-9
