= Finis Germania =

2017 book by Rolf Peter Sieferle

First edition (publ. Verlag Antaios)

Finis Germania is a collection of writings about German political culture by the German historian Rolf Peter Sieferle that was published posthumously in 2017. The book was, according to the American writer Christopher Caldwell, by the "German literary establishment unanimously denounced" as "an extremist tract", but it became a bestseller.

== Synopsis ==
Sieferle argues that Germans seem to want their nation to disappear. He asserts that the post-World War II Allied occupation by the Western Allies (Britain, France and the United States) saddled Germany with a false image of Germany as a pre-modern culture fundamentally different from the West. He denies this, writing that although this image may fit Russia, and although other Western nations may find it difficult to face the truth, which is that “If Germany belonged to the most progressive, civilized, cultivated countries,” he writes, “then ‘Auschwitz’ means that, at any moment, the human ‘progress’ of modernity can go into reverse.” He argues that Germans are saddled with the conviction that German sins are unique and absolute, beyond comparison and beyond redemption, and that this conviction has become a hereditary burden, a self-demonisation that meant Germany felt obliged to accept an unsustainable number of migrants in 2015.

Christopher Caldwell remarks that the wild popularity of Finis Germania is "odd," considering that the book consists of "little more than a collection of notes on various subjects" made in the 1990s, most of which were previously published in a more finished form. Caldwell notes that "Finis Germaniae" is a widely used phrase in German history, that captures a fear or paranoia about national decline.

== See also ==
- German collective guilt
- Wiedergutmachung
