= Virility =

Traits of masculinity viewed in a positive light

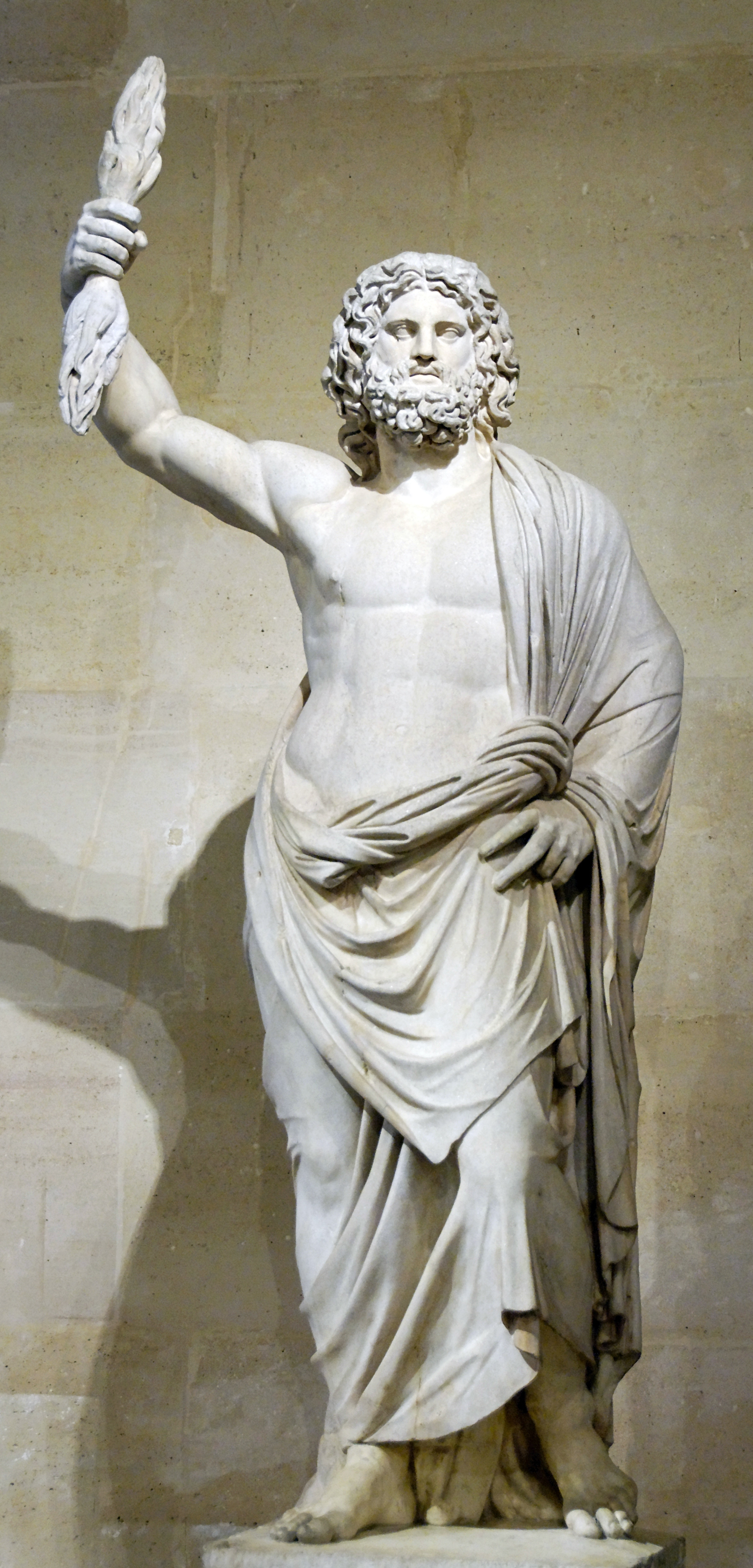
Historically, masculine attributes such as beard growth have been seen as signs of virility and leadership (for example, in ancient Egypt and Greece).

Virility (from the Latin virilitas, manhood or virility, derived from Latin vir, man) refers to any of a wide range of masculine characteristics viewed positively. Virile means "marked by strength or force". Virility is commonly associated with vigour, health, sturdiness, and constitution, especially in the fathering of children. Virile has become obsolete in referring to a "nubile" young woman, or "a maid that is Marriageable or ripe for a Husband, or Virill".

Historically, masculine attributes such as beard growth have been seen as signs of virility and leadership (for example in ancient Egypt and Greece).

== Male virility ==
Evidence shows that increased male age is associated with a decline in semen volume, sperm motility, and sperm morphology. In studies that controlled for female age, comparisons between men under 30 and men over 50 found relative decreases in pregnancy rates between 23% and 38%.

Older men have lower semen parameters resulting in lower fertility potential. The effects of aging on semen quality are summarized below based on a study of 1,219 subjects:

| Age group (years) | Number of subjects (n) | Volume (ml) [min–max] | Total Sperm count (million) [min–max] | Motility (grades a + b) (%) [min–max] | Morphology (%) [min–max] |
|---|---|---|---|---|---|
| 21–28 | 57 | 2.9±1.3 [1.0–6.0] | 144.3±138.0 [0.2–414] | 47.5±25.4 [0–88] | 26.1±13.3 [0–49] |
| 29–35 | 450 | 2.7±1.5 [0.2–8.0] | 149.5±173.7 [0.1–1358] | 48.1±30.4 [0–95] | 24.8±15.7 [0–55] |
| 36–42 | 532 | 2.5±1.5 [0.4–10.5] | 120.4±156.7 [0.2–949] | 40.0±27.1 [0–83] | 23.1±15.9 [0–56] |
| 43–49 | 165 | 2.4±1.4 [0.1–8.0] | 112.3±142.7 [0.2–776] | 33.1±25.1 [0–84] | 23.0±16.5 [0–60] |
| 50–60 | 15 | 1.7±1.1 [0.5–4.5] | 61.0±91.1 [0.1–329] | 31.3±23.9 [0–59] | 19.7±14.5 [0–37] |

Sperm count declines with age, with men aged 50–80 years producing sperm at an average rate of 75% compared with men aged 20–50 years. However, an even larger difference is seen in how many of the seminiferous tubules in the testes contain mature sperm:

- In males 20–39 years old, 90% of the seminiferous tubules contain mature sperm.
- In males 40–69 years old, 50% of the seminiferous tubules contain mature sperm.
- In males 80 years old and older, 10% of the seminiferous tubules contain mature sperm.

Research shows increased risks for health problems for children of older fathers. A large-scale Israeli study found that the children of men who were 40 or older were 5.75 times more likely than children of men under 30 to have an autism spectrum disorder, controlling for year of birth, socioeconomic status, and maternal age. Increased paternal age has also been correlated to schizophrenia in numerous studies.

Researchers have found evidence to suggest overweight and obesity may cause subtle damage to sperm and prevent healthy pregnancy. They say fertilization was 40% less likely to succeed when the father was overweight.

The American Fertility Society recommends an age limit for sperm donors of 50 years or less, and many fertility clinics in the United Kingdom will not accept donations from men over 40 or 45 years of age.

== See also ==
- Fertility
- Muliebrity
- Machismo
- Masculinity
- Physical strength
- Virilization
- Virtus
- Vīrya (Hinduism) (Sanskrit term for the same)
