= Germany Abolishes Itself =

2010 non-fiction book by Thilo Sarrazin

Germany Abolishes Itself: How We're Putting Our Country in Jeopardy
- German-language book cover
- Author: Thilo Sarrazin
- Original title: Deutschland schafft sich ab: Wie wir unser Land aufs Spiel setzen
- Language: German
- Subject: Dysgenics; Cultural criticism Opposition to immigration
- Genre: Non-fiction
- Publisher: Deutsche Verlags-Anstalt
- Publication date: 2010
- Publication place: Germany
- ISBN: 978-3-421-04430-3

Germany Abolishes Itself: How We're Putting Our Country in Jeopardy (German title: Deutschland schafft sich ab: Wie wir unser Land aufs Spiel setzen) is a 2010 book by Thilo Sarrazin. The book deals with the impacts on Germany that, in the view of Sarrazin, an economist and SPD politician, will result from the combination of declining birth rates, a growing underclass, and immigration from predominantly Muslim countries. Following its publication Sarrazin left his position at the Deutsche Bundesbank and was eventually expelled from the SPD in 2020.

== Themes ==
According to the American journalist John Judis, Sarrazin argued for restricting Muslim immigration to Germany on the grounds that Muslims who had immigrated to Germany from Turkey and other Muslim countries had failed to assimilate into German society, lived culturally separate lives in densely Muslim neighborhoods, and that two thirds of Germany's Muslim immigrants were on welfare.

Sarrazin argued that if immigration continued, Germany would, over time, become a predominantly Muslim country.

== Publication and reaction ==
The book was released on 30 August 2010. It "shot to the top of the bestseller list;" It held the #1 spot on the German bestseller list for 21 weeks, selling 1.5 million copies by 2012, and becoming "Germany's best selling political nonfiction book, by a German author, of the decade."

The Bundesbank accused Sarrazin of repeatedly violating political moderation with his provocative and discriminatory statements on migration, damaging the institution's reputation and disrupting workplace harmony. Sarrazin initially refused to resign. On September 2, 2010, the Bundesbank's Executive Board requested his dismissal, and his responsibilities were immediately withdrawn. Two days later, Sarrazin warned President Wulff against a 'political show trial' and threatened legal action.

On September 9, 2010, negotiations led to the Bundesbank dropping the allegations, Sarrazin requesting his release, and the bank withdrawing its dismissal request. Sarrazin received a pension as if he had served until 2014, with an additional thousand euros per month compared to the initial offer.

== Reception ==
The book sparked heated debate. Turkish-born social scientist Necla Kelek argued that Sarrazin's ideas on education and immigration should be debated, without condemning him, and that the political class declines to engage with his arguments.

Journalist Simon Kuper has argued that, with over 1 million copies sold, Sarrazin had done more to publicize the concept of Eurabia than anybody else in Europe.

The Abendzeitung noted that Sarrazin's theses are "not explicitly false, but statistically or verbally manipulated in such a way that the truth has at least been distorted." His claim that "the proportion of congenital disabilities among Turkish and Kurdish migrants is far above average [and] entire clans [...] have a tradition of inbreeding" cannot be substantiated because disabilities resulting from inbreeding are not statistically recorded. Furthermore, he points out that Turks marry a German partner in only 8% of cases, while ethnic Germans from Russia do so in 67% of cases, without considering that 'most ethnic Germans from Russia already have a German passport' and can marry each other without being excluded from this statistic. Sarrazin's assertion that Sharia law is gaining ground in Germany is not substantiated, and his thesis that male Turkish family heads are "largely unemployed" is incorrect, as the unemployment rate among Turks is indeed above average but still only 25%.

== See also ==
- The Death of the West (2001)
- Le Suicide français (2014)
- Finis Germania (2017)
