= Blanche Ostertag =

American artist (1872–1915)

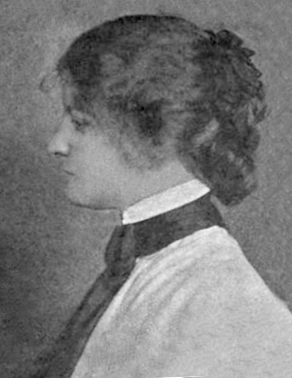
- Born: August 27, 1872; Saint Louis, Missouri
- Died: November 13, 1915 (aged 43); New York, New York
- Education: Académie Julian; St. Louis Museum of Fine Arts

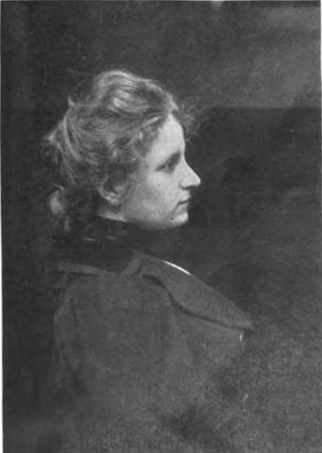
Blanche Ostertag

Blanche Adele Ostertag (August 27, 1872 – November 13, 1915) was an American decorative artist. She is best remembered for her decorative painting and delight in children as subjects. Born in St. Louis, Missouri, she first studied for one month at the St. Louis Museum of Fine Arts in 1892 and then moved to Paris. At the Académie Julian, she was a pupil of Rodolphe Julian, Jean-Paul Laurens, Constant, and also studied with Raphael Collin, Léon-Augustin Lhermitte, and Delance. Her awards include the Revell prize, for school room decoration, St. Louis. Her work includes mural decorations: "Sailing of the Claremont," New Amsterdam Theatre, New York; "Old Indian Fort," Northwestern Railway Station, Green Bay, Wisconsin; "Everlasting Covenant" (5 panels), "The Songs of David" (3 panels), and mosaics, Husser House, Chicago; Illustrations for "Old Songs for Young America." She exhibited in Champ de Mars Salons (1895, 1896) and was a member of the Society of Western Artists.

== Biography ==
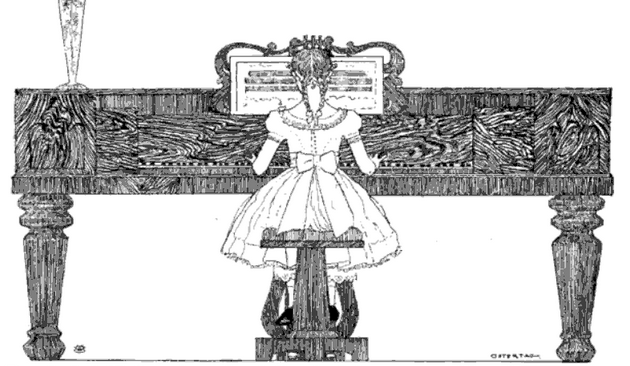
Drawing by Blanche Ostertag in "Old Songs for Young America"

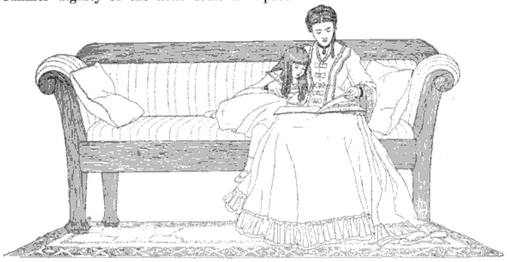
Drawing in "Old Songs for Young America"

Ostertag was born in St. Louis and became a resident of Chicago. She was born to a German father Dr. Albert Ostertag from Württemberg and Swiss mother Annette Baudy. In Paris, she exhibited at both Salons, where she may have been the youngest contributor, and also showed pictures at several American exhibitions before she found her true vein of decorative work. She produced covers, calendars, and posters, which were in demand among collectors. She also designed some elaborate chimney-pieces carried out in glass and gold mosaic. Her later work and first essay in book illustration was “Old Songs for Young America," done in collaboration with the musician, Clarence Forsythe. Her droll and dainty decorations in delicate colors were quite frankly inspired by Boutet de Monvel’s treatment of the nursery songs of France.

She spent four years in Paris, after a brief month's preliminary study at the Saint Louis Art Museum. After a few weeks at the St. Louis Museum and a little supplementary study at home, Ostertag studied at Julien's and Delecluse's, summered in Dutch hamlets, and sketched, between times, many phases. She learned much from Jules Guerin, the illustrator; not as his pupil —he had no pupils— but from his untrammelled criticism and from watching him work. "He taught me the value of values," she said.

Her knowledge of languages gave her an advantage over too many transatlantic pilgrims. Of mixed French and German parentage, she learned both languages from childhood. Speaking French like a native won her the interest of such diversely useful personages as the painter Jean-Charles Cazin and the maid-of-allwork Henriette the bonne, who looked after Ostertag and wrote to her affectionately as "her Mademoiselle Blanche."

From Paris, she went to Chicago. She took a studio and exhibited at the Art Institute of Chicago: Holland spinners, French boulevards, an occasional portrait, notable for tone and balance. These the critics praised and the public knew not of. She also exhibited at the Pennsylvania Academy of Fine Arts, including Boulevard Raspail (oil) and Portrait of Miss U. (watercolor), both in 1898. She also served on the advisory sub-committee for the Universal Exposition, St. Louis, in 1904. Inevitably she experimented in many means of expression: etchings, monotypes, pastels. One of these went into Hamilton McCormick's collection. Twelve small designs were included in a calendar zinc-etched in colors. The pictures were about the size, shape, and style of tiles. Five-inch squares with romantic subjects heavily outlined and colored in flat washes. They had nothing to do with the seasons and the holidays beyond a certain feeling for the appropriate. Thus March was a knight-errant riding a white charger over bare brown hills; April was a green-mantled Elizabethan dame beating her way against a shower in a narrow street of half-timbered houses; July showed two lovers floating in a gondola past the marble steps of an Italian garden, the swain singing rapturously to his lute. And so on. No special Christmas or Valentine's Day or Fourth of July business. Perhaps the absence of these timeworn themes was welcome. Perhaps the public really recognized a fresh and individual touch. Anyhow that calendar had "an immense little success." From a few leaflets sent across the ocean to la bonne Henriette in her cremerie certain rising French artists even wrote to America for more. Max Liebermann, the leader of the German Secession, praised them. Actually they were the turning-point for their creator from pictorial to decorative art.

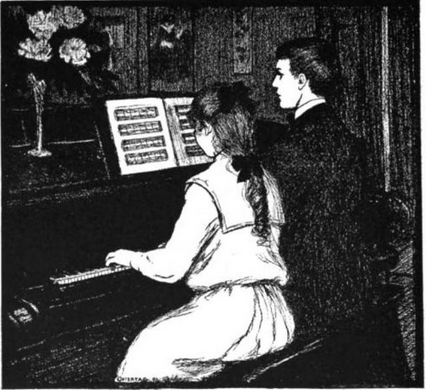
Poster drawing for "Piano Study"

On them followed other calendars, other title - pages, other covers, and posters. One advertising a piano course was a charcoal drawing of a demurely attentive boy and girl. Another for a linen sale set forth, in a notable combination of a few colors, a mother in a white morning robe buttoning her little girl's starched frock beside an open bureau drawer wherein piles of embroidered garments could be seen. The two dainty figures were in themselves winning, but gathered artistic force from the child's carroty tresses against the pink-striped wall-paper, the flowered tester and hangings, the rich red brown of the old mahogany furniture. As usual in Ostertag's pictures, the furniture was of correct design. Another calendar that took like wildfire displayed in a harmony of greens and chromes a small Velasquez-like princess with spreading hoop and parrot on fist. Still another shows a pale boy dreaming by the side of a lily-covered pond while his mother reads a book; on one of the lily-pads a palpable fairyland creature has appeared, a fat frog wearing a golden crown. This is a symphony in sunny green and lemon yellow, with touches of faint lilac in the flowers and the mother's gown. The backgrounds were always architecturally sound. "Yankee Doodle" rides his pony through the quaintest of step-gabled streets and across a toll-bridge of the real old type. The pretty maid waits for Johnny to come home from the fair" in front of a genuine Colonial mansion, buff and white, with a fan-light over its columned portico.

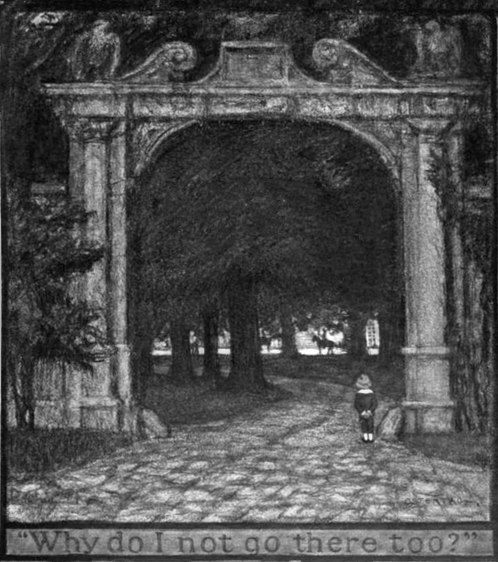
Illustration for Max Muller's "Memories"

Such chronological details were noted only as proving conscientious research even in childish matters. For the most part, the artist chose the early Victorian fashions—men in peg-top plaid trousers; women in crinolines, angel sleeves, lockets, and hair-nets; little girls in pig-tails and pantalettes. Here were delectable and varied decorations breathing a sort of innocent drollery, what M. de Monvel called "a precious quality of naivete". Her illustrations for Max Müller's "Memories," were stamped with unusual breadth and proportion.

Not unnaturally, Ostertag was associated with some of the leading Western architects; with Frank Lloyd Wright, for instance, in a characteristic residence called the Husser House at Buena Park in Chicago built in 1899. Although the house was demolished around 1923, a description of the mosaic she designed was published in 1902: "From the spacious central hall one sees, through doorways to left and right, two remarkable fireplaces. That in the drawing-room is carried out from her design in glass and gold mosaic— heavily hanging wisteria in creamy white shading to yellowish and greenish hues of opalescent glass on a band of burnished gold. One of its peculiarities is the clever use of a sort of gold crackle in the green leaves, simulating veins, and binding the whole together. The dining-room mantelpiece is painted on oak. The tablet over the fireplace has some verses from the 143rd Psalm in gold and colors set in a thick pattern of grapes. The side panels bear each a mediaeval lady in brocade carrying a dish of fruit, with the motto, "O give thanks unto the Lord, for He is good." These vibrate with orange, blue, and green, the pigments laid on pure as the impressionists use it, and the natural golden brown of the wood cunningly planned as part of the color scheme."

Among later, more serious work, there were portraits of children, and a series of watercolors setting forth the funny bashfulness or funnier dignity of children in a deep glow of color. In "When Love is Young", the lad in brown Holland and the blue-frocked lassie stand hand in hand on green turf gemmed with marigolds, and gaze out most seriously from a background of warm yellow leaves.

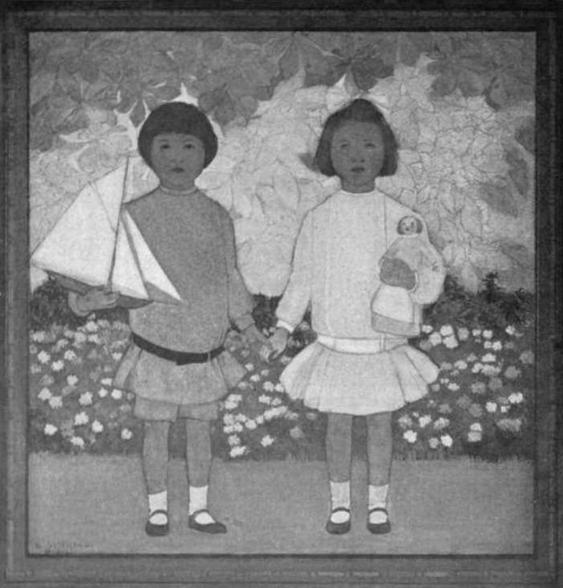
Drawing of 19th-century children

Ostertag had a rare feeling for color. She loved costume; her pictures were constantly enriched with the interweavings of Persian embroideries, or the splendid pomegranates of Venetian brocade, or the often piquant and humorous plaids, dots, and stripes. She loved architecture, so that balance and mass were in the very structure of her compositions, and she lost no chance of introducing a background of buildings or the fine lines of 18-century cabinet-makers. She loved children and she lifted them out of the commercial into the artistic plane.

== Bibliography ==
- Bowker, R.R. (1913). American Art Directory (Public domain ed.). R.R. Bowker.
- Charles Scribner's Sons (1903). "Blanche Ostertag by Isabel McDougall". The Book Buyer (Public domain ed.). Charles Scribner's Sons. p. 309.
- Good Literature Publishing Company (1902). The Critic (Public domain ed.). Good Literature Publishing Company.
- Leonard, John William; Marquis, Albert Nelson (1901). Who's who in America (Public domain ed.). Marquis Who's Who.
