= Amélie Beaury-Saurel =

French painter (1849–1924)

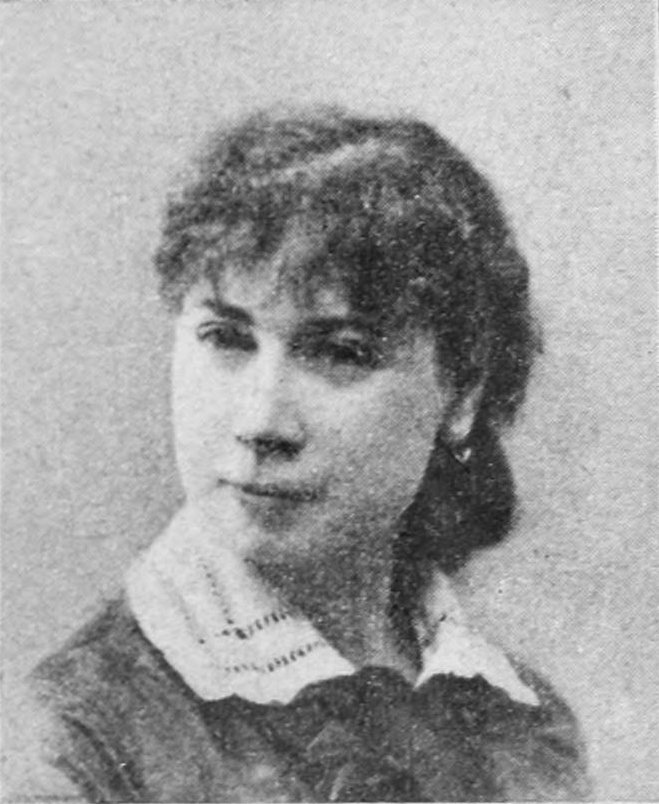
- Born: Amélie Beaury; 1849; Barcelona, Spain
- Died: May 30, 1924 (aged 74–75); Paris, France
- Known for: Painting

Signature
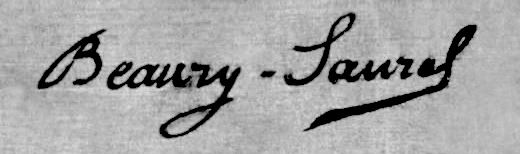

Amélie Beaury-Saurel (1849 – May 30, 1924) was a French painter noted for portraiture.

== Life and career ==
Born in Barcelona as Amélie Beaury, she added "Saurel" to her name in recognition of her mother's family who could trace their lineage to the Byzantine emperors of the 11th century. Her family lived in Spain and Corsica, but eventually settled in France where she enrolled in the Academie Julian and paid for her studies by carrying out administrative duties and managing the finances.

At various times, she was a pupil of J. Lefebvre, T. Robert-Fleury and J.P. Laurens in Académie Julian, and became a very popular portrait painter, thanks to Léon Bonnat. She married Rodolphe Julian in 1895 and took on charge a women's atelier. In her publications, Marie Bashkirtseff (also a Julian pupil) talked distrustfully about "l'espagnole" (the Spanish woman). She made her début in the Salon de Paris in 1874, where she was considered one of the most important artists of the Salon in 1880.

Amélie Beaury-Saurel provided generously most of her mother and sister's necessities. After Julian's death, she bought and laid out "Château Julian", in Lapalud, a village in Provence, in memory of her husband, who had been born there. She died in Paris.

== Awards and recognition ==
She was awarded with a Third Medal in the Salon in 1885 and a bronze medal in 1889 World's Fair. Mlle Amélie Beaury-Saurel also exhibited a self-portrait, a drawing, at the Salon of 1887, a work which received superlative praise. Like Anna Bilinska she was admired for the "virility" of her technique.

Beaury-Saurel was included in the 2018 exhibit Women in Paris 1850–1900.

== Gallery ==
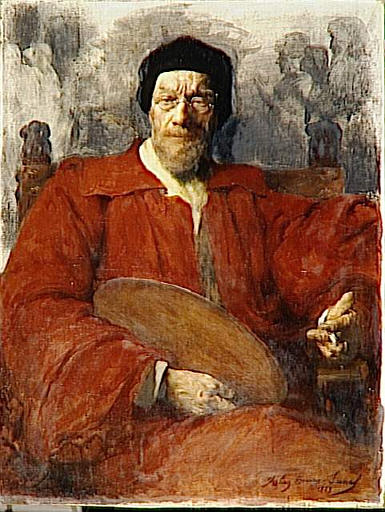
Portrait of Jean Paul Laurens (1838-1921), French painter, 1919

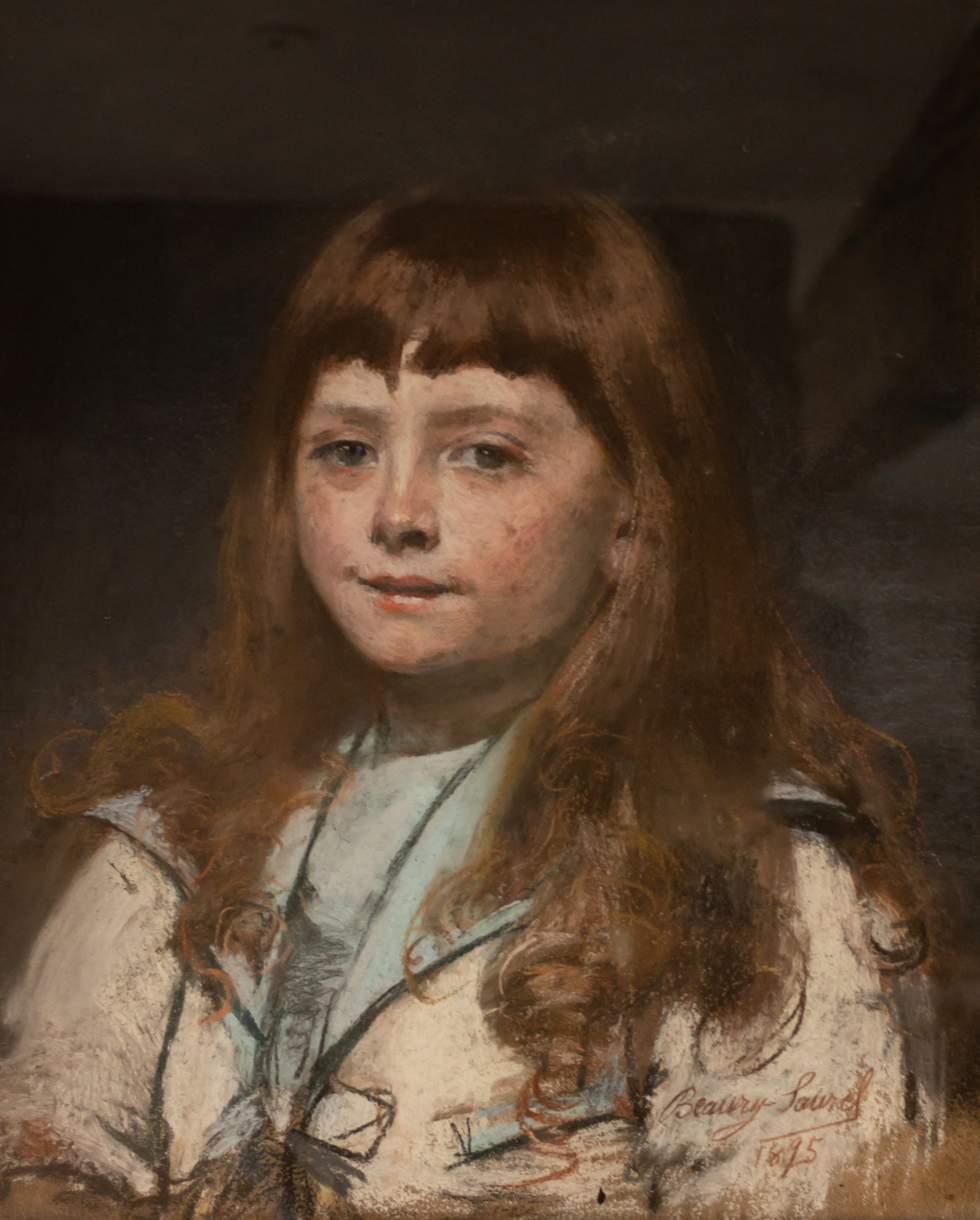
Portrait of a Girl, 1895

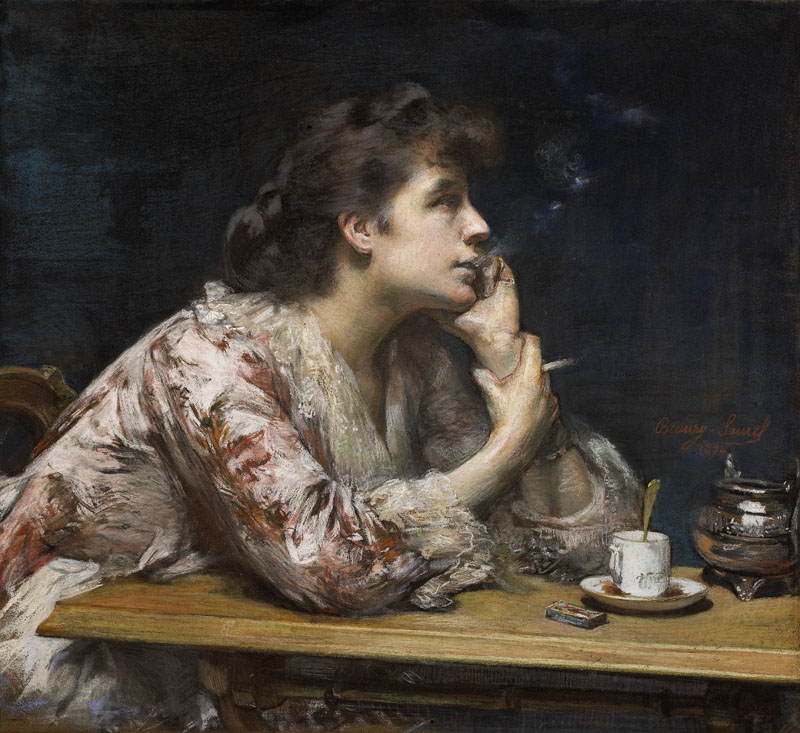
Dans le bleu, 1894

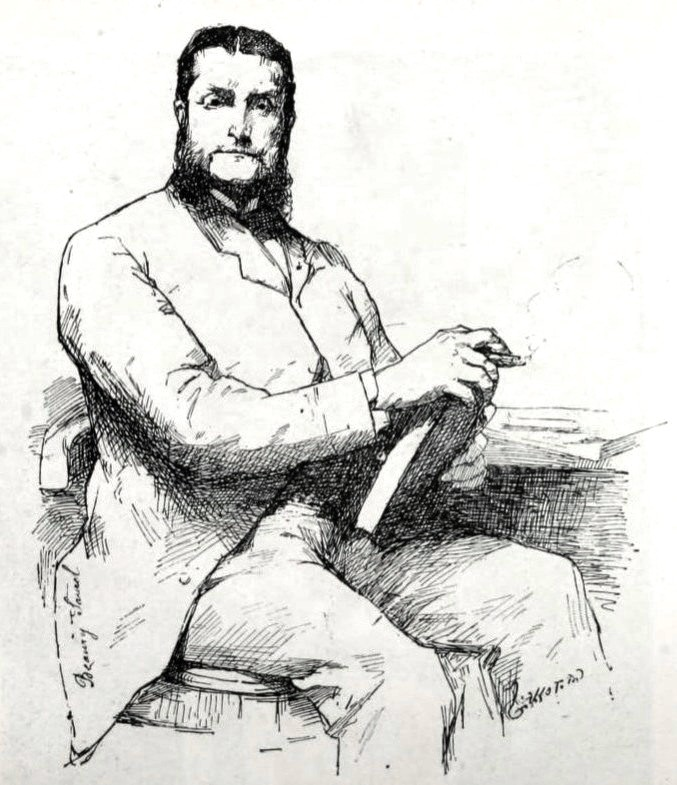
Portrait of M Felix Voisin, 1898

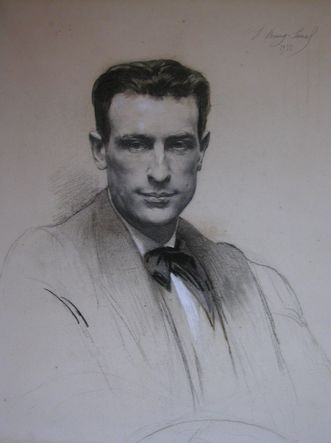
Portrait of Gilbert Dupuis

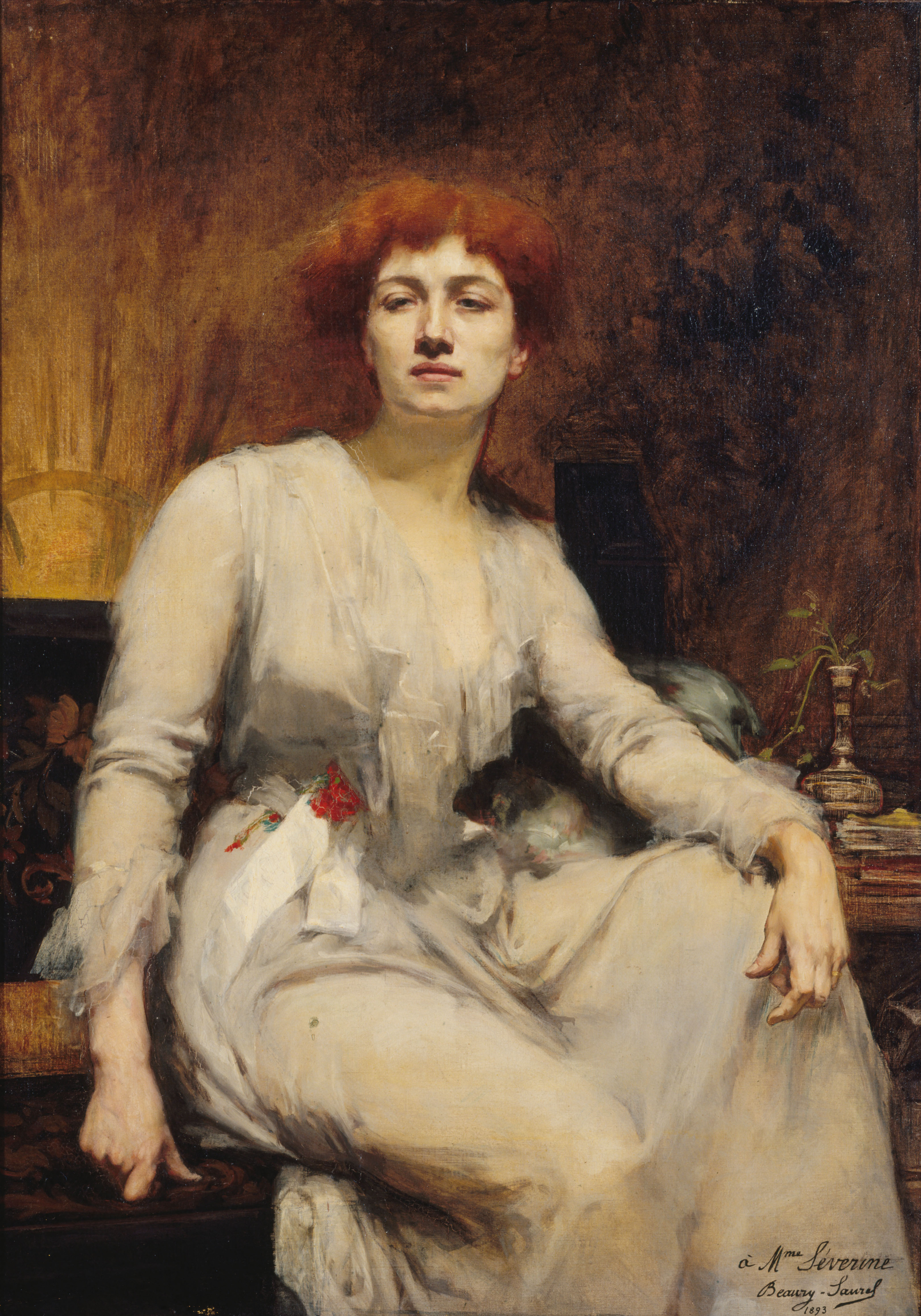
Portrait of Séverine, 1893

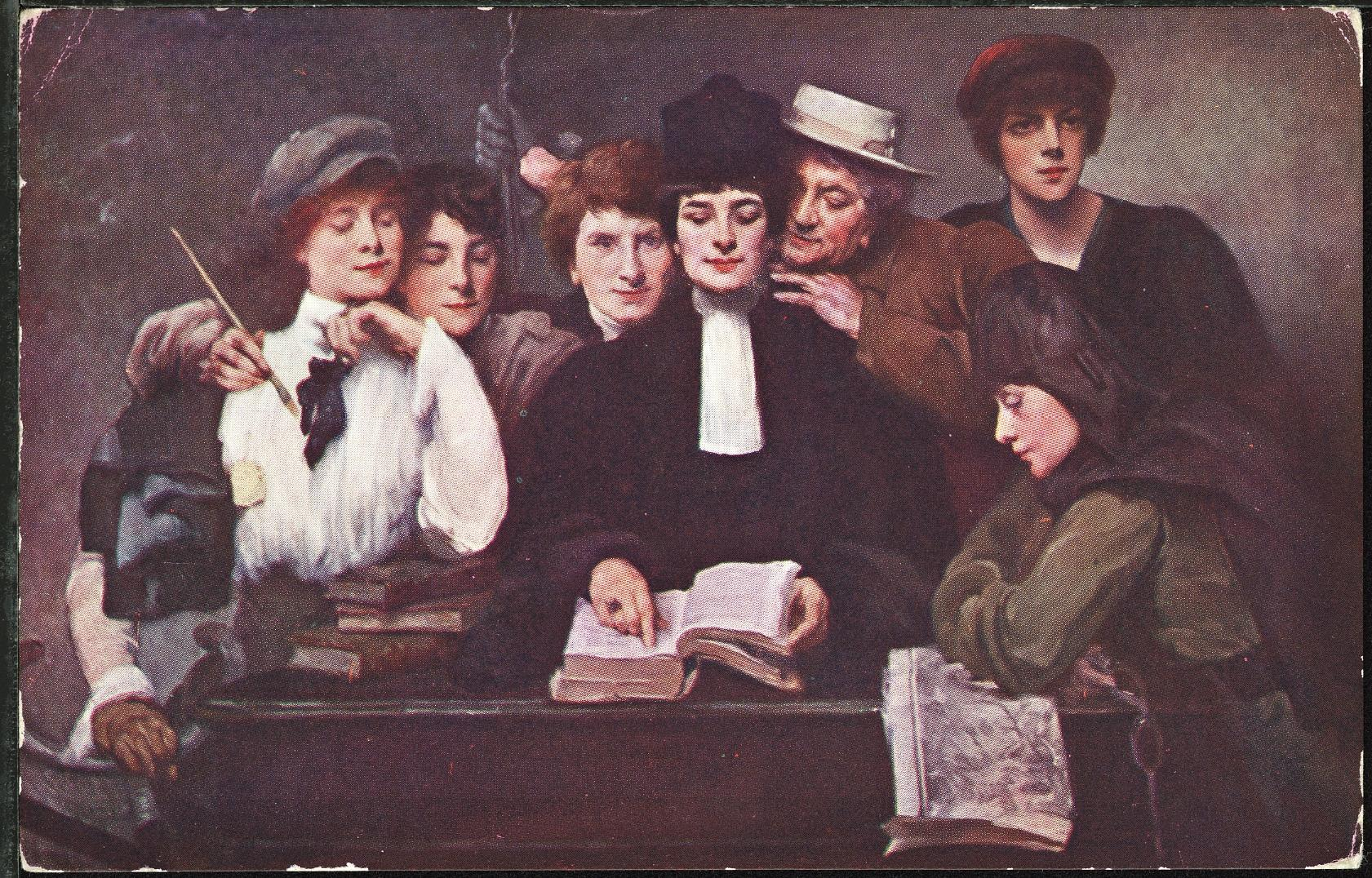
Postcard reproduction of a painting by Beaury-Saurel exhibited at the Paris Salon in 1914, representing seven pioneers

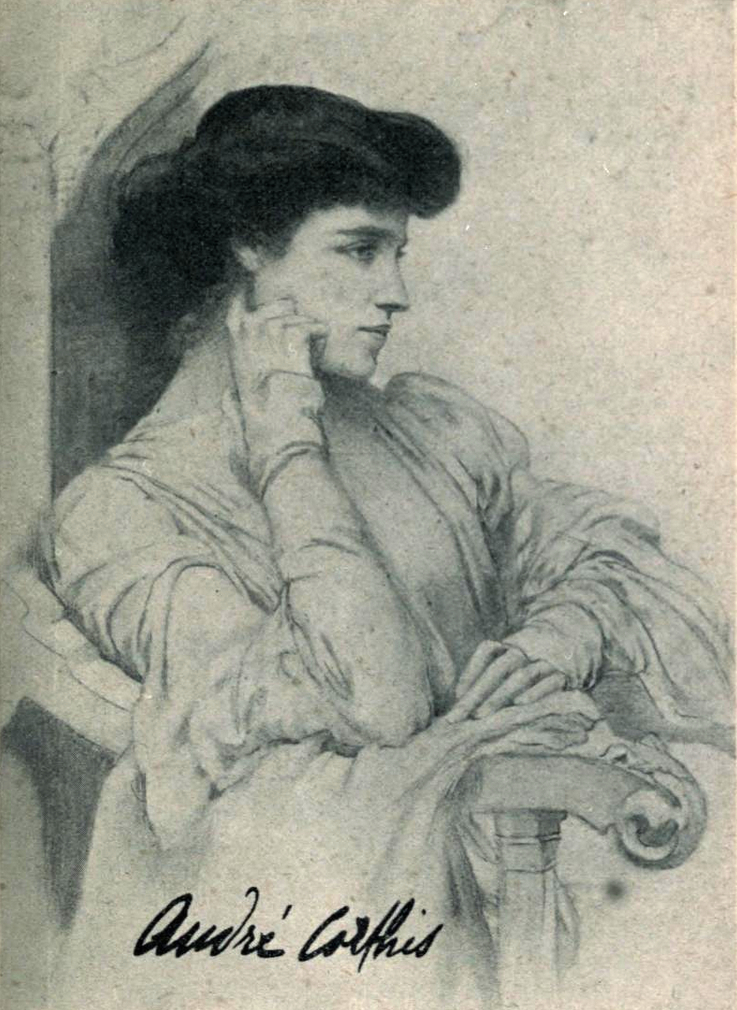
Portrait of the French writer André Corthis, circa 1908

== Selected works ==
- "Christ en croix" de l'Église Saint-Etienne, Issy-les-moulineaux, 1873.
- "Portrait d'une femme noire", 1884
- "Le travail de M. Frey, Maître d'armes", prix d'honneur à l'exposition Blanc et Noir de 1891.
- "Portrait de Séverine", 1893.
- "Dans le bleu", 1894.
- "Le repos du modèle" (Musée d'Amiens)
- "Portrait de Mme G. C..."
- "Jean-Paul Laurens (1838-1921) peintre", 1919.
- "Portrait of Gilbert Dupuis", 1922.
- "Portrait de Léonce Bénédite (1859-1925) conservateur du musée du Luxembourg", 1923 (Musée d'Orsay).
- "Portrait d'Alexis Ballot-Beaupré (1836-1917)"
