= Dominique Barbéris =

French writer

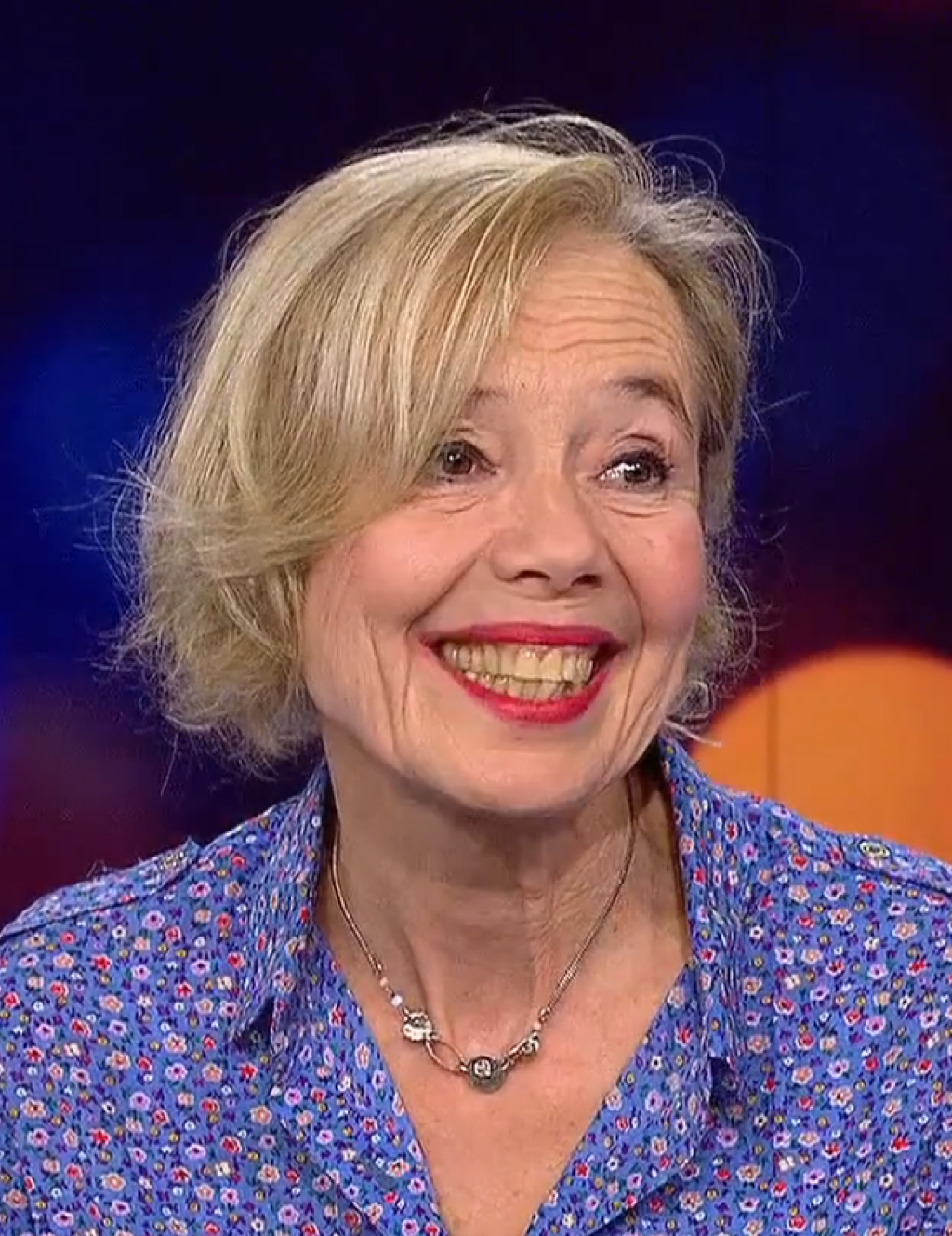
- 23/11/2023
- Born: 1958 (age 67–68); Cameroon
- Occupations: writer, novelist, essayist, professor
- Writing career
- Movement: French literature

Dominique Barbéris (born 1958) is a French novelist, author of literary studies and university professor, specializing in stylistics and writing workshops.

== Biography ==
Born in 1958 in Cameroon to a French family from Nantes. Dominique Barberis studied at the Ecole Normale Supérieure and Sorbonne University in Paris after her childhood in Nantes, then in Brussels. She began teaching literature at a high school in Boulogne-Billancourt before joining an insurance company as head of communications. She later taught in several other schools. She was then appointed professor at the University of Paris IV (now Sorbonne University) in the foreign languages and applied foreign languages department, and then at the French language department in which she runs stylistic courses and novel writing workshops.

== Novelist ==
Author of 11 novels and stories, she devotes a large part of her activity to writing. Her writing has been widely praised by the French press, including in Le Monde, Le Figaro, and various press reviews.

Her eleventh novel, Une façon d'aimer (A way of loving) received in 2023 the Grand Prix du roman de l'Académie française, one of the major French literary prizes. It tells the story of Madeleine, a discreet and melancholic beauty from the 1950s who resembles the French actress Michèle Morgan, whos leaves her native Brittany to follow her husband to Cameroon and finds herself immersed in a foreign, violent, and magnificent world. In Douala, during a ball at the Delegation, she falls in love with Yves Prigent, half-administrator, half-adventurer. But decolonization is underway and is a precursor for things to come.

Her tenth novel, Un dimanche à Ville d'Avray, was translated under the name A Sunday in Ville-d'Avray in the United States by John Cullen for Other Press and the United Kingdom by Daunt Books. In the apparently peaceful of Paris suburb town Ville-d'Avray, two sisters get closer one Sunday, and one confides in the other and reveals her meeting with a man. The translated novel was noticed by the press (The Guardian, The Times, and US and British press review on the website of the publisher Daunt Books) and literary festivals. This novel's title recalls that of a film by Serge Bourguignon, Cybèle ou les Dimanches de Ville d'Avray, winner of the Oscar for best foreign film in 1963.

Her novel Les Kanourous (The Kangaroos) was adapted for cinema in 2005 in France by director Anne Fontaine under the name Entre ses mains (In his hands). The melancholic kangaroos of the Jardin des Plantes zoo of Paris do not look you in the face. The young woman we meet in Dominique Barbéris novel thinks they don't dare. “And suddenly I said to myself that they must not have looked the murderer in the face either; but certainly, they had seen it.” Three murders take place, each time in the area where she lives, and as she herself is a young woman alone, these tragedies concern her. This novel, a kind of atmospheric Parisian thriller, has been compared to Hitchcock.

Her first and tenth novel were published by Arlea, and the others by Editions Gallimard, one of the leading French book publishers. It has been translated in total in 7 countries (United States, United Kingdom, Germany, Spain, Poland, Greece and Lithuania).

== University professor ==
Leading the Sorbonne University novel writing workshops, Barberis published with the support of the cultural service at Éditions Sillage, 14 opuses of Prose en Sorbonne, Writing workshops by Dominique Barbéris, corresponding to the best texts produced by her students each year.

A member of the reading committee of the Book review Europe, she has published numerous critical articles, literary studies (including a style study devoted to the Nobel prize writer Annie Ernaux) and prefaces in French at Editions Gallimard (including three recent ones devoted to classics of English literature: Emma by Jane Austen, A Christmas Carol by Charles Dickens and Jane Eyre by Charlotte Brontë).

Barberis was awarded Knight of the Legion of Honor in 2008.

== Bibliography ==
=== Literature ===
- La Ville, Arléa, 1996 and pocket edition 2009
- L'Heure exquise, Éditions Gallimard, « L'Arpenteur » collection, 1998 – Prix Marianne (Mariane prize)
- Le Temps des dieux, Éditions Gallimard, « L'Arpenteur » collection, 2000
- Les Kangourous, Éditions Gallimard, « L'Arpenteur » collection, 2002 – adapté à l’écran en 2005 par Anne Fontaine sous le titre Entre ses mains.
- Ce qui s’enfuit, Éditions Gallimard, « L'Arpenteur » collection, 2005
- Quelque chose à cacher, Éditions Gallimard, « Folio » pocket edition and « Blanche » collection, 2007 – finalist of Prix Femina 2007, Prix des Deux Magots 2008 et Prix de la Ville de Nantes, 2008
- Beau Rivage, Éditions Gallimard, « Blanche » collection, 2010
- La Vie en marge, Éditions Gallimard, « Blanche » collection, 2014
- L'Année de l'éducation sentimentale, Éditions Gallimard, « Blanche » collection, 2018 – Prix Jean-Freustié 2018.
- Un dimanche à Ville-d'Avray, Arléa, « La rencontre » Collection, 2019 and Éditions Gallimard, « Folio » pocket edition 2021.
- Une façon d'aimer, Éditions Gallimard,« Blanche » collection, 2023, Grand Prix du roman de l'Académie française 2023.

=== Studies and prefaces ===
- Marcel Proust, Un amour de Swann, Nathan, coll. « Balises », 1990.
- Un roi sans divertissement (a king alone): introduction to the work of Jean Giono, Nathan, coll. « Balises », 1991.
- Langue et littérature : anthologie XIX^{e} et XX^{e} siècle (avec Dominique Rincé), 1992.
- Chateaubriand, Nathan, coll. « Balises », 1994.
- Marguerite Duras, Moderato cantabile / L'Amant (The lover), Nathan, coll. « Balises », 1995.
- Alain-Fournier, Le Grand Meaulnes, preface, Imprimerie nationale, coll. « La Salamandre », 1996.
- « La parataxe dans l’écriture d'Annie Ernaux; Pour une écriture photographique du réel » (Parataxis in the writing of Annie Ernaux; For a photographic writing of reality), revue Tra-jectoires n°3, 2006.
- Gustave Flaubert, Voyages, Arléa, coll. « Arléa-poche », 2007.
- « Je suis aussi... », préface pour le recueil de Carlos Alvarado Larroucau, L'Harmattan, coll. « Poètes des cinq continents », 2009.
- Jane Eyre, Charlotte Brontë, preface, Editions Gallimard, Coll. « Folio », 2012.
- Charles Dickens, Contes de Noël (A Christmas carol), preface, Editions Gallimard, coll. « Folio », 2012.
- Louise de Vilmorin, Madame de..., Dominique Barbéris relit Madame de, Revue critique de fixxion francaise contemporaine, 2012.
- Jean-Pierre Richard : « La chair du monde », Revue Europe, 2019.
- Cahier de l'Herne Annie Ernaux, « Sur le style de La Place » (On the style of La Place), l'Herne, 2022.
- Critiques libres : « Karel Schoeman, Le jardin céleste (Die Hemeltuin) Acte Sud», La Nouvelle Revue Française, 2023.

== Reviews on her work ==
- Quatre lectures, Four readings: critical essay of Jean-Pierre Richard, Fayard 2002.

== Sources ==
Part of this biography was obtained from her studies and prefaces. See also:

- Interview with Anne Fontaine in Europe 2.
- Les Sanglots de l'automne, Le Figaro Littéraire, jeudi 4 octobre 2007
- L'air du soupcon, Liberation, 20 September 2007
- Secret automne, Le Figaro magazine, 28 September 2007
- El Louvre, inspiración para la ficción, La Nación, 21 January 2009

Other Interviews, in The Nouvel Obs, The Sud Ouest, and many other newspapers.
