= François Duhourcau =

French historian (1883–1951)

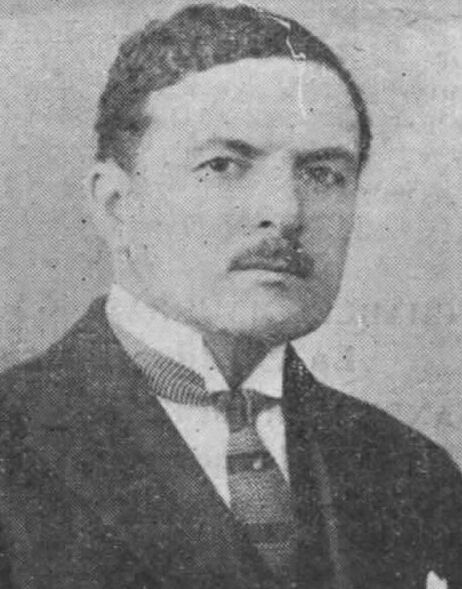
François Duhourcau in the Almanac de l'Action française of 1926.

François Duhourcau (25 February 1883 – 3 March 1951, Bayonne), graduated from the École spéciale militaire de Saint-Cyr in the infantry in 1905, was a 20th-century French novelist, essayist and historian, winner of the Grand prix du roman de l'Académie française in 1925.

== Works ==
- 1912: Juvenilia
- 1920: La Révolte des morts
- 1921: Un homme à la mer, preface by Maurice Barrès (Prix Auguste Furtado of the Académie française)
- 1924: La Rose de Jéricho
- 1925: L'Enfant de la victoire, Grand prix du roman de l'Académie française
- 1925: La Demi-Morte, read on Revue des deux mondes
- 1927: Grappes de Jurançon et d'Irouléguy
- 1929: La Voix intérieure de Maurice Barrès, d'après ses cahiers
- 1932: Le Roman de Roncevaux
- 1933: La Mère de Napoléon, Letizia Bonaparte
- 1933: Une sainte de la Légende dorée. Sainte Bernadette de Lourdes
- 1936: Le Saint des temps de misère. François d'Assise
- 1937: Bonaparte peint par lui-même, preface by Sainte-Beuve
- 1937: Les Trois B : Basquie, Béarn, Bigorre, preface by Francis Jammes
- 1939: Jeanne d'Arc, ou le Miracle français,
- 1941: Henri IV, libérateur et restaurateur de la France
- 1944: Pays basque et Côte d'argent
- 1946: Jésus-Christ
