= Albert Touchard =

French writer (1876–c.1940)

Albert Camille Touchard (Paris 7 February 1876 - date of death unknown, but between 1935 and 1945) was a French author. He is best remembered as author of La Guêpe (1934) which won Grand Prix du roman de l'Académie française in 1935.
