= Ap. J.-C. =

2007 novel by Vassilis Alexakis

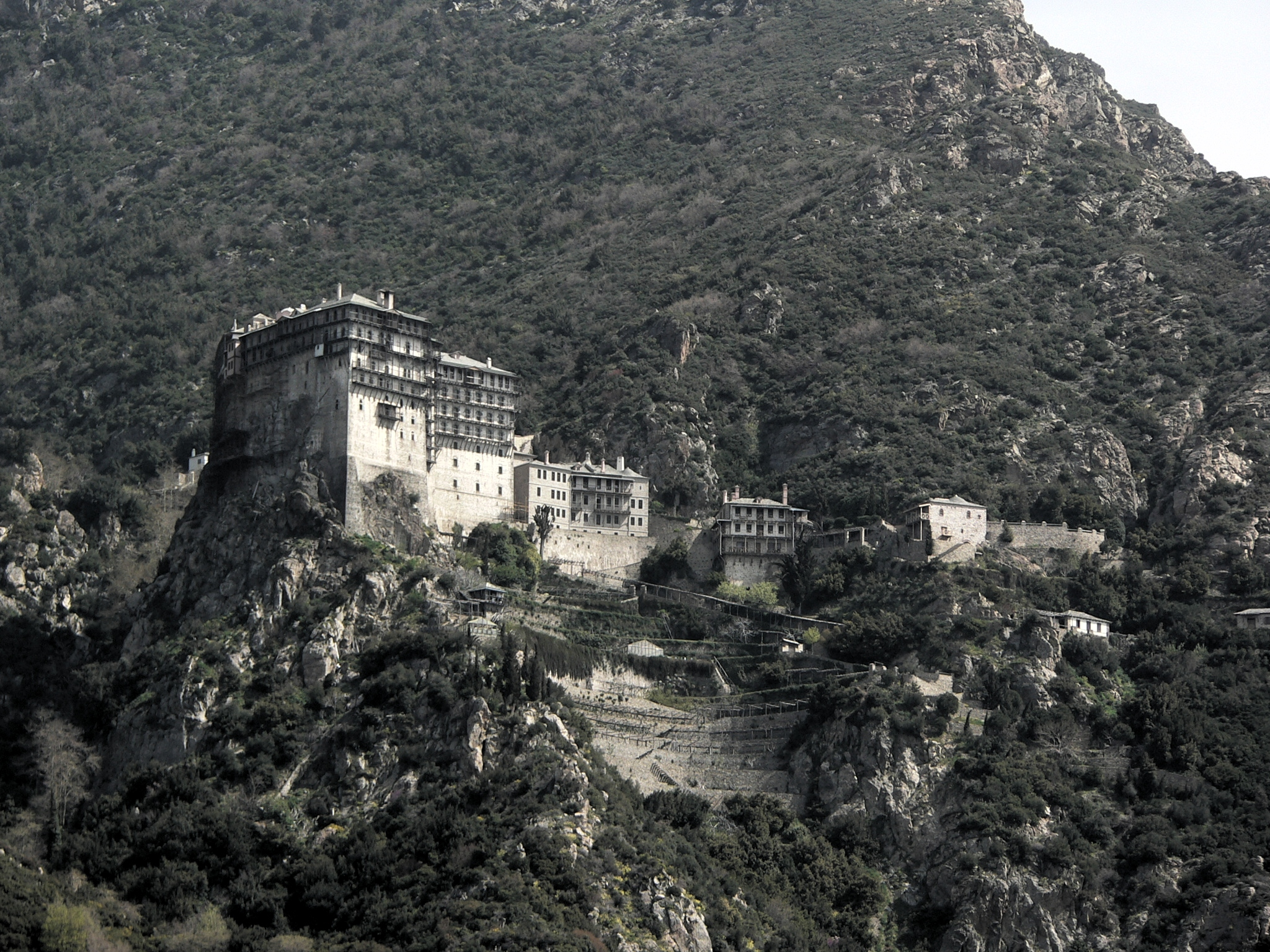
- The monastery of Simonos Petra on Athos
- Author: Vassilis Alexakis
- Language: French
- Publisher: Stock
- Publication date: 14 August 2007
- Publication place: France
- Pages: 390
- Awards: Grand Prix du roman de l'Académie française
- ISBN: 2234057930

Ap. J.-C. is a novel by Vassilis Alexakis, published in 2007 by Stock. It was awarded the Grand Prix du roman de l'Académie française in that same year.

Like many of his previous works, this novel was written in French. In it, Alexakis wished to criticise the functioning of the Monasteries of Mount Athos, whilst also describing such functions and the links between the Greek Orthodox Church and the worlds of finance and politics.
