= Vladimir Volkoff =

French writer (1932–2005)

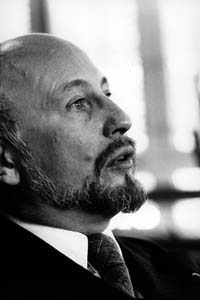
1979

Vladimir Volkoff (7 November 1932 – 14 September 2005) was a writer of Russian origin who lived in France and whose books were written in French. He produced both literary works for adults and spy novels for young readers under the pseudonym Lieutenant X. His works are characterised by themes of the Cold War, intelligence and manipulation, but also by metaphysical and spiritual elements.

== Biography ==
Volkoff was born in Paris, the son of a Russian émigré who earned his living in France washing cars. Vladimir grew up with his family's memories of the lost motherland and loyalty to their new homeland. He was a great grandnephew of the composer Piotr Ilyich Tchaikovsky.

After studying at the Sorbonne in Paris and the university of Liège, Volkoff taught English at Amiens from 1955-57. He served as an intelligence officer in the French army during the Algerian War, where he learnt how war is fought as much in the shadows and the embassies as in the open air of the battlefield.

=== America ===
After his demobilisation, Volkoff travelled to the United States to teach French and Russian literature. He worked as a translator (1963–65), and a professor of French and Russian from 1966-77. Fascinated by the powerful country teeming with contradictions, he remained there for almost three decades, returning to France in 1992. Among his "American" works are L'Agent triple (1962), Métro pour l'enfer (1963), Les Mousquetaires de la République (1964) and Vers une métrique française (1977).

Throughout the 1970s under his pseudonym Lieutenant X, Volkoff published stories for teenagers in the Langelot series of Hachette's Bibliothèque verte imprint, featuring the adventures of the eponymous hero, a young French secret agent. In these works Volkoff showed his taste for romantic intrigues and plot twists, and his profound understanding of the balance of forces prevailing in the world.

In the later 1970s, with the standoff between East and West a constant reality, Volkoff's writings analyzed the ideological combat between two opposing conceptions of the world and of freedom with a solid geopolitical background.

An avid competitive fencer, Volkoff was a valued member of the Georgia Division of the AFLA and the Atlanta (and later, Macon) fencing community during his time in America. He claimed to have begun learning to fence in a stint in the Foreign Legion. His book "The Traitor," translated from the French by J.F. Bernard and published by Doubleday and Company was written and published during his time in Atlanta (1973); it was published under another pseudonym, Lavr Divomlikoff (a reshuffling of the letters of his name).

=== Return to Europe ===
Volkoff's 1979 novel Le retournement (The Turnaround) earned him international acclaim and was translated into a dozen languages. Dedicated to Graham Greene, whom Volkoff greatly admired, the novel's title refers to the intelligence manoeuvre of turning an uncovered enemy agent to one's own side. The book tells a story of espionage in which the American, French and Soviet intelligence services do battle, but also of a spiritual overturning which, unknown to these secret services, almost makes a martyr of the main character.

In 1980 Volkoff published Les humeurs de la mer, a vast contemporary fresco in four volumes: Olduvaï, La leçon d'anatomie (The Anatomy Lesson), Intersection and Les maîtres du temps (Masters of Time). With Le montage ("The Set Up"; winner of the Grand Prix du roman de l'Académie française, 1982) Volkoff illustrated the methods and networks of tricks and traps of Soviet "disinformation" in Europe; the idea of this novel could have come from Alexandre de Marenches, director of the SDECE, who may have provided the factual basis for its plot.

In 1985, inspired by his American experience, he published Le professeur d'histoire (The History Teacher), in which he portrayed a comic confrontation between a literary man filled with tradition and a young heiress surfing the wave of modernism.

Power, manipulation, battles of influence and disinformation take a central role in many of his books, such as L'Interrogatoire (1988) and Les Hommes du Tsar (1989), a historical novel about Russia from the death of Ivan the Terrible to the advent of the Romanovs.

In the 1990s Volkoff published Le Bouclage (1990), a novel about the insecurity of large cities, and La Trinité du Mal ou réquisitoire pour servir au procès posthume de Lénine, Trotski et Staline (The Trinity of Evil, or an indictment for the posthumous trial of Lenin, Trotsky and Stalin) (1991).

The fall of the Berlin Wall opened Volkoff's work to all kinds of disinformation and manipulation campaigns, not just those of communist regimes. Volkoff established a place for the term "désinformation" in the French language with his books La Désinformation Arme de guerre (republished in 2004 by Les éditions L'Age d'Homme), La Crevasse (1996), Petite histoire de la désinformation (A short history of disinformation) (1999), Désinformation flagrant délit (1999), L'Enlèvement (2000) and Manuel du politiquement correct (Handbook of the Politically Correct) (2001).

In the 2000s he returned to his Slavic roots, publishing several texts on Russian history and orthodoxy, and publicly declared his support for Vladimir Putin's policies.

In addition, Volkoff wrote historical biographies such as Vladimir, Le Soleil Rouge (The Red Sun) and Tchaikovsky, and also wrote for the theatre. He was awarded the Grand Prix Jean Giono for his work in 1995 and in the same year was made a Chevalier de la Légion d'honneur.

=== Family ===
Vladimir Volkoff died in Bourdeilles, Dordogne, survived by his second wife, Carla Denise Volkoff, and his only child, Tatiana Gfoeller-Volkoff, from his first marriage.

== Honors and awards ==
- Knight of the Order of Legion of Honour
