= The Return (Droit novel) =

First English-language edition (publ. Andre Deutsch)

The Return (French: Le Retour) was a 1964 novel by Michel Droit, published by Éditions Julliard and winning the Grand Prix du roman de l'Académie française for 1964.
