= Yvonne Pagniez =

French journalist and writer

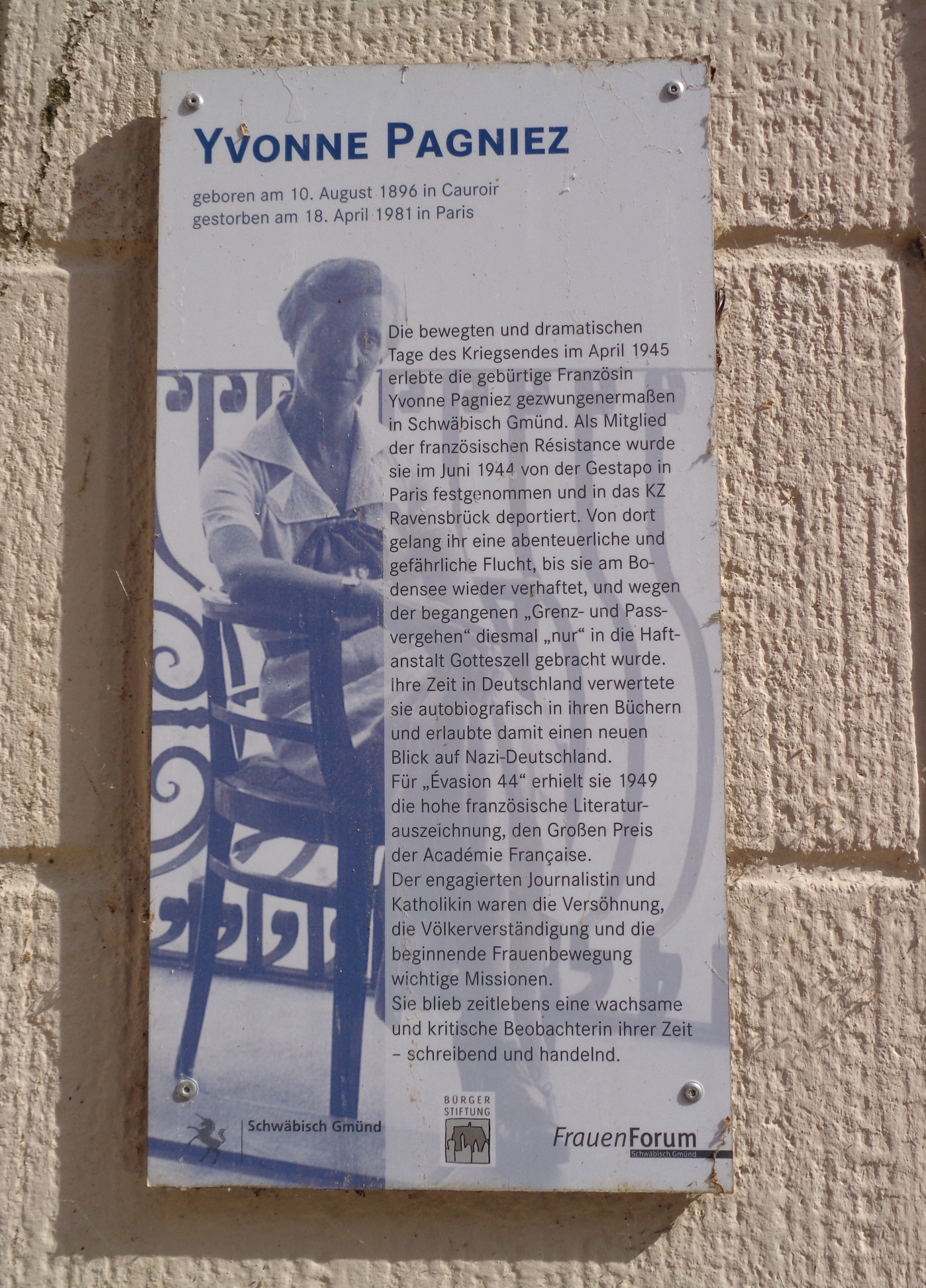
Memorial plaque of Yvonne Pagniez in Schwäbisch Gmünd, Germany

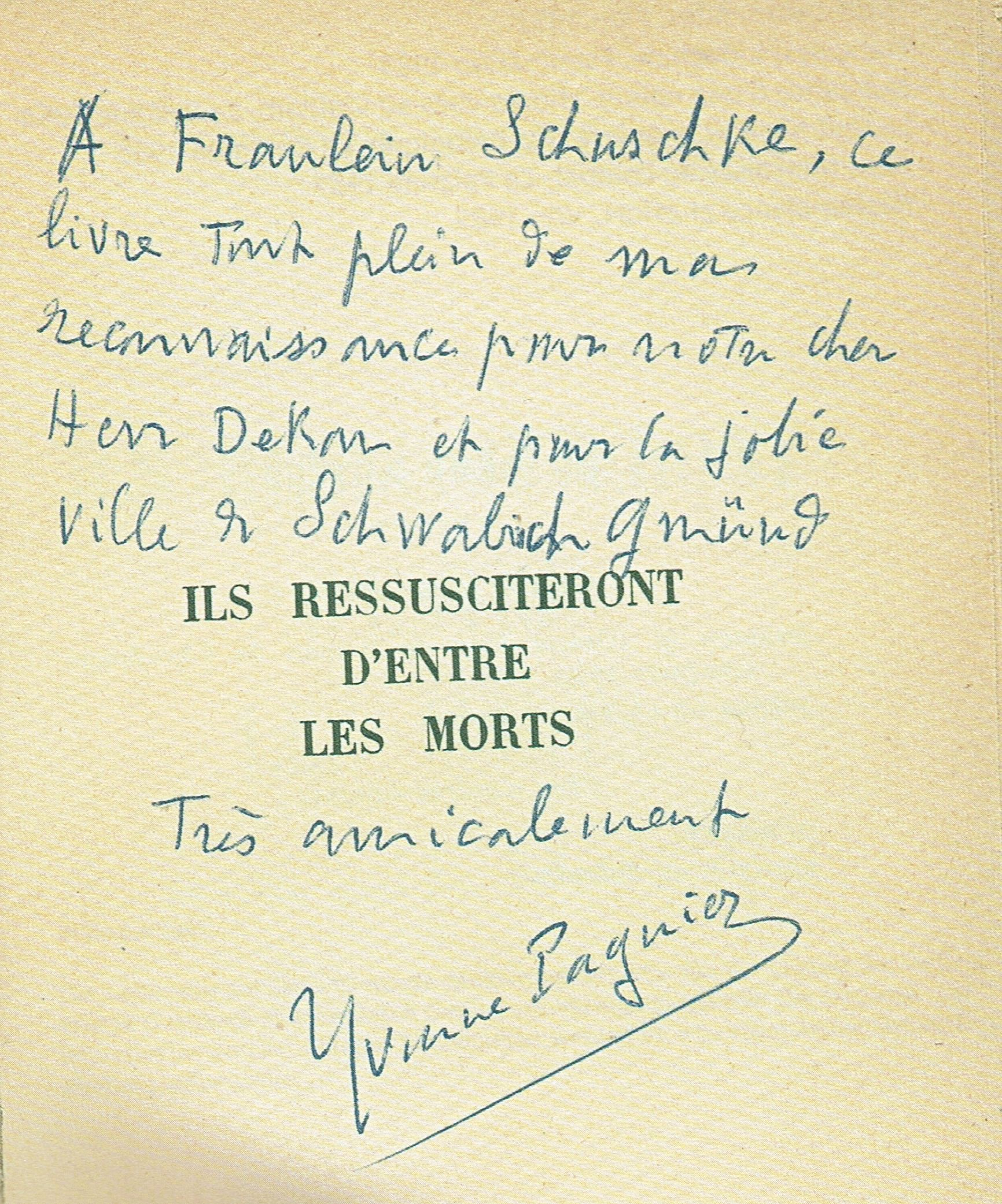

Yvonne Pagniez (10 August 1896 – 18 April 1981) was a French journalist and award-winning writer, and a member of the French Resistance during the Second World War.

Pagniez was born at Cauroir, near Cambrai, the daughter of Lucien Pagniez, a sugar manufacturer, and his wife, the former Marguerite Risbourg. Yvonne Pagniez studied Philosophy before becoming a nurse during the First World War.

== First World War ==
Pagniez, her mother and her sisters fled from the Cambrai region when it was occupied in 1914. Her brother, Maurice, was wounded, then interned and finally reunited with his family in Switzerland. Her father, arrested as a spy in 1915, escaped from prison at Le Quesnoy and also made his way to Switzerland. After working with refugees in Savoie, Yvonne Pagniez was trained as an intelligence agent prior to the Armistice of 1918 which ended the war. She then worked with the Red Cross to repatriate refugees before returning to Paris to complete her degree.

== Early career ==
In 1925, she married an older relative, Philippe Pagniez, who was a doctor. The following year, she gave birth to a son, named Yves. During this period, she joined the Union Féminine Civique et Sociale. She began visiting Trez-Hir, the home of a relative, at Plougonvelin in Brittany, where she was inspired by her surroundings to begin writing.

Her first book, the novel Ouessant, was published in 1935 and won the Prix Montyon. Her second, Pêcheur de goémon, was awarded the Prix Marcelin Guérin in 1940.

== Second World War ==
In 1940, at the outbreak of war, Pagniez declined to be evacuated from Paris, choosing to remain with her husband. She joined the Organisation civile et militaire, a movement of the Resistance. On 4 June 1944, she was arrested by the Gestapo; on 15 August, she was deported to Ravensbrück concentration camp. From there she was temporarily sent to Torgau, and escaped from her transport on the way back to Ravensbrück. Sheltered in Berlin by German and French underground agents, she succeeded in crossing the border into Switzerland.

== Post-war ==
Pagniez's literary career continued successfully after the Second World War, but her husband died in 1947. She won another award from the Academie, the Prix Durchon-Louvet, in 1947 for Scènes de la vie de bagne. She won the Grand prix du roman de l'Académie française in 1949 for her novel Évasion 44.

Her work as a war correspondent in Vietnam and Algeria resulted in further publications. After the defeat at the Battle of Dien Bien Phu in 1954, there was no longer a place for the French in the region, and Pagniez returned to France, retiring to the isle of Ushant (Ouessant) in Brittany.

== Death ==
She died on 18 April 1981, aged 84.

== Published works ==
=== Novels ===
- Ouessant (1935)
- Pêcheur de goémon (1939)
- Scènes de la vie du bagne (1947)
- Évasion 44 (1949)
- Ils ressusciteront d'entre les morts (1949)

=== Non-fiction ===
- Françaises du désert (1952)
- Oasis sahariennes (1952)
- Français d'Indochine (1953)
- Naissance d'une nation : choses vues au Vietnam (1954)
- La guerra de Indochina y el Vietnam rojo (in Spanish; 1954)
- Aspects et conséquences de la guerre en Indochine (1954)
- Le Viet Minh et la guerre psychologique (1955)
- Ailes françaises au combat (1957)

== Bibliography ==
- Yvonne Pagniez : 1896 - 1981; 1945: vom Gefängnis zur Freiheit; Schriftstellerin, Widerstandskämpferin, Europäerin. Schwäbisch Gmünd 2013 ISBN 978-3-936373-97-4
