= Grand Prix du roman de l'Académie française =

French literary award

The Grand Prix du roman is a French literary award, created in 1914, and given each year by the Académie Française. Along with the Prix Goncourt, the award is one of the oldest and most prestigious literary awards in France. The Académie Française gives out over 60 literary awards each year, and the Grand Prix du roman is the most senior for an individual novel.

== List of laureates of the Grand prix du roman ==
Year		Author	Title	Publisher (x times)	Notes
1915	nothumb	Paul Acker	for his entire works		
1916		Louis de Blois, dit Avesnes	L'Île heureuse	Plon	
1917		Charles Géniaux	for his entire works		
1918		Camille Mayran	Histoire de Gotton Connixloo	Plon (2)	
1919	nothumb	Pierre Benoit	L'Atlantide	Albin Michel	
1920		André Corthis	Pour moi seule	Albin Michel (2)	
1921		Pierre Villetard	Monsieur Bille dans la tourmente	Éditions Fasquelle	
1922	nothumb	Francis Carco	L'Homme traqué	Albin Michel (3)	
1923	nothumb	Alphonse de Châteaubriant	La Brière	Grasset	
1924		Émile Henriot	Aricie Brun ou les Vertus bourgeoises	Plon (3)	
1925		François Duhourcau	L'Enfant de la victoire	Éditions La Vraie France	
1926	nothumb	François Mauriac	Le Désert de l'amour	Grasset (2)	
1927	nothumb	Joseph Kessel	Les Captifs	Gallimard	
1928		Jean Balde	Reine d'Arbieux	Plon (4)	
1929	nothumb	André Demaison	Le Livre des bêtes qu'on appelle sauvages	Grasset (3)	
1930	nothumb	Jacques de Lacretelle	Amour nuptial	Gallimard (2)	
1931		Henri Pourrat	Gaspard des montagnes	Albin Michel (4)	
1932		Jacques Chardonne	Claire	Grasset (4)	
1933		Roger Chauviré	Mademoiselle de Bois-Dauphin	Flammarion	
1934		Paule Régnier	L'Abbaye d'Évolayne	Plon (5)	
1935		Albert Touchard	La Guêpe	Les Éditions de France	
1936	nothumb	Georges Bernanos	The Diary of a Country Priest	Plon (6)	
1937		Guy de Pourtalès	La Pêche miraculeuse	Gallimard (3)	
1938		Jean de La Varende	Le Centaure de Dieu	Grasset (5)	
1939	nothumb	Antoine de Saint-Exupéry	Wind, Sand and Stars	Gallimard (4)	
1940		Édouard Peisson	Le Voyage d'Edgar	Grasset (6)	
1941		Robert Bourget-Pailleron	La Folie Hubert	Gallimard (5)	
1942		Jean Blanzat	L'Orage du matin	Grasset (7)	
1943	nothumb	Joseph-Henri Louwyck	Danse pour ton ombre !	Plon (7)	
1944		Pierre Lagarde	Valmaurie	Éditions Baudinière	
1945		Marc Blancpain	Le Solitaire	Flammarion (2)	
1946		Jean Orieux	Fontagre	Fontaine (revue)	
1947	nothumb	Philippe Hériat	Famille Boussardel	Gallimard (6)	
1948		Yves Gandon	Ginèvre	Henri Lefebvre	
1949		Yvonne Pagniez	Évasion 44	Flammarion (3)	
1950		Joseph Jolinon	Les Provinciaux	Éditions Milieu du Monde	
1951		Bernard Barbey	Chevaux abandonnés sur le champ de bataille	Julliard	
1952		Henri Castillou	Le Feu de l'Etna	Albin Michel (5)	
1953		Jean Hougron	Mort en fraude	Éditions Donnat	
1954		(ex-æquo) Pierre Moinot	La Chasse royale	Gallimard (7)	
1954		(ex-æquo) Paul Mousset	Neige sur un amour nippon	Grasset (8)	
1955		Michel de Saint Pierre	Les Aristocrates	La Table ronde	
1956	nothumb	Paul Guth	Le Naïf Locataire	Albin Michel (6)	
1957		Jacques de Bourbon Busset	Le Silence et la Joie	Gallimard (8)	
1958		Henri Queffélec	Un royaume sous la mer	Presses de la Cité	
1959		Gabriel d'Aubarède	La Foi de notre enfance	Flammarion (4)	
1960		Christian Murciaux	Notre-Dame des désemparés	Plon (8)	
1961		Pham Van Ky	Perdre la demeure	Gallimard (9)	First Vietnamese laureate
1962		Michel Mohrt	La Prison maritime	Gallimard (10)	
1963		Robert Margerit	La Révolution	Gallimard (11)	
1964		Michel Droit	Le Retour	Julliard (2)	
1965		Jean Husson	Le Cheval d'Herbeleau	Seuil	
1966		François Nourissier	Une histoire française	Grasset (9)	
1967	nothumb	Michel Tournier	Vendredi ou les Limbes du Pacifique	Gallimard (12)	
1968		Albert Cohen	Belle du Seigneur	Gallimard (13)	
1969		Pierre Moustiers	La Paroi	Gallimard (14)	
1970		Bertrand Poirot-Delpech	La Folle de Lituanie	Gallimard (15)	
1971	nothumb	Jean d'Ormesson	The Glory of the Empire	Gallimard (16)	
1972	nothumb	Patrick Modiano	Les Boulevards de ceinture	Gallimard (17)	
1973	nothumb	Michel Déon	Un taxi mauve	Gallimard (18)	
1974		Kléber Haedens	Adios	Grasset (10)	
1975	Prize not awarded				
1976	nothumb	Pierre Schoendoerffer	The Paths of the Sea	Grasset (11)	
1977	nothumb	Camille Bourniquel	Tempo	Julliard (3)	
1978		Pascal Jardin	Le Nain jaune	Julliard (4)	
1979		Henri Coulonges	L'Adieu à la femme sauvage	Stock	
1980	nothumb	Louis Gardel	Fort Saganne	Seuil (2)	
1981	nothumb	Jean Raspail	Moi, Antoine de Tounens, roi de Patagonie	Albin Michel (7)	
1982	nothumb	Vladimir Volkoff	Le Montage	Julliard (5)	
1983		Liliane Guignabodet	Natalia	Albin Michel (8)	
1984		Jacques-Francis Rolland	Un dimanche inoubliable près des casernes	Grasset (12)	
1985		Patrick Besson	Dara	Seuil (3)	
1986	nothumb	Pierre-Jean Rémy	Une ville immortelle	Albin Michel (9)	
1987	nothumb	Frédérique Hébrard	Le Harem	Flammarion (5)	
1988		François-Olivier Rousseau	La Gare de Wannsee	Grasset (13)	
1989		Geneviève Dormann	Le Bal du dodo	Albin Michel (10)	
1990	nothumb	Paule Constant	White Spirit	Gallimard (19)	
1991		François Sureau	L'Infortune	Gallimard (20)	
1992	nothumb	Franz-Olivier Giesbert	L'Affreux	Grasset (14)	
1993		Philippe Beaussant	Héloïse	Gallimard (21)	
1994		Frédéric Vitoux	La Comédie de Terracina	Seuil (4)	
1995	nothumb	Alphonse Boudard	Mourir d'enfance	Robert Laffont	
1996		Calixthe Beyala	Les Honneurs perdus	Albin Michel (11)	
1997	nothumb	Patrick Rambaud	La Bataille	Grasset (15)	Laureate of the prix Goncourt the same year
1998	nothumb	Anne Wiazemsky	Une poignée de gens	Gallimard (22)	
1999		(ex-æquo) François Taillandier	Anielka	Stock (2)	
1999	nothumb	(ex-æquo) Amélie Nothomb	Fear and Trembling	Albin Michel (12)	Author from Belgium
2000	nothumb	Pascal Quignard	Terrasse à Rome	Gallimard (23)	
2001	nothumb	Éric Neuhoff	Un bien fou	Albin Michel (13)	
2002		Marie Ferranti	La Princesse de Mantoue	Gallimard (24)	
2003		Jean-Noël Pancrazi	Tout est passé si vite	Gallimard (25)	
2004		Bernard du Boucheron	Court Serpent	Gallimard (26)	
2005		Henriette Jelinek	Le Destin de Iouri Voronine	Éditions de Fallois	
2006	nothumb	Jonathan Littell	The Kindly Ones	Gallimard (27)	Laureate of the prix Goncourt the same year
2007	nothumb	Vassilis Alexakis	Ap. J.-C.	Stock (3)	
2008		Marc Bressant	La Dernière Conférence	Fallois (2)	
2009	nothumb	Pierre Michon	Les Onze	Éditions Verdier	
2010	nothumb	Éric Faye	Nagasaki	Stock (4)	
2011	nothumb	Sorj Chalandon	Return to Killybegs	Grasset (16)	
2012	nothumb	Joël Dicker	The Truth About the Harry Quebert Affair	Fallois (3)	First Swiss laureate, also winner of the prix Goncourt des lycéens the same year
2013	nothumb	Christophe Ono-dit-Biot	Plonger	Gallimard (28)	Also laureate of the prix Renaudot of lycéens
2014		Adrien Bosc	Constellation	Stock (5)	
2015	nothumb	(ex-æquo) Hédi Kaddour	Les Prépondérants	Gallimard (29)	Author of Tunisian origin
2015	nothumb	(ex-æquo) Boualem Sansal	2084 : la fin du monde	Gallimard (30)	Algerian author
2016		Adélaïde de Clermont-Tonnerre	Le Dernier des nôtres	Grasset (17)	
2017	nothumb	Daniel Rondeau	Mécaniques du chaos	Grasset (18)	
2018	nothumb	Camille Pascal	L'Été des quatre rois	Pion (9)	
2019	nothumb	Laurent Binet	Civilizations	Grasset (19)	
2020		Étienne de Montety	La grande épreuve	Stock (6)	
2021	nothumb	François-Henri Désérable	Mon maître et mon vainqueur	Gallimard (31)	
2022	nothumb	Giuliano da Empoli	Le mage du Kremlin	Gallimard (32)	
2023	nothumb	Dominique Barbéris	Une façon d'aimer	Gallimard (32)	
2024	nothumb	Miguel Bonnefoy	Le Rêve du jaguar	Payot et Rivages	French-Venezuelan author
2025	nothumb	Yanick Lahens	Passagères de nuit	Sabine Wespieser	Hatian author
