= Michel Droit =

French novelist and journalist (1923–2000)

- Born: Michel Arnould Arthur Droit; 23 January 1923; Vincennes, French Third Republic
- Died: 22 June 2000 (aged 77); La Celle-Saint-Cloud, France
- Education: Lycée Voltaire; Lycée Louis-le-Grand; Faculté des lettres de Paris; École Libre des Sciences Politiques
- Occupations: Novelist journalist
- Known for: Member of the Académie Française

Michel Droit (23 January 1923 – 22 June 2000) was a French novelist and journalist. He was the father of the photographer Éric Droit (1954–2007).

== Biography ==
After studying at the Faculté des lettres de Paris and Sciences Po, Droit joined the French Army in 1944 and was wounded near Ulm in April 1945. He took on a career as a press, radio and television journalist after the Second World War and at the 1960s he was the preferred television interviewer of général de Gaulle.

His first novel, Plus rien au monde, dates to 1954. In 1964, he won the Grand prix du roman de l'Académie française for his novel The Return (Le Retour). On 6 March 1980, on the same day as Marguerite Yourcenar, he was elected as a member of the Académie française, replacing Joseph Kessel.

Droit wrote a polemic against a reggae adaptation of La Marseillaise as Aux armes et cætera by Serge Gainsbourg, reproaching him for "provoking" a resurgence of anti-Semitism and thus making things difficult for his "co-religionists". Droit was attacked for this position by the Mouvement contre le racisme et pour l'amitié entre les peuples.

Droit got into legal difficulties as a member of the CNCL, a television regulator set up in the 1980s, but this was thrown out of court with the help of his lawyer Jean-Marc Varaut.

Droit accidentally killed one of his companions on a safari in Africa.

Droit died in 2000 and is buried in the Passy Cemetery.

== Works ==
- De Lattre Maréchal de France, Pierre Horay, 1952 (livre sur Jean de Lattre de Tassigny)
- André Maurois, Éditions universitaires, 1953 (livre sur André Maurois)
- Plus rien au monde, Prix Max Barthou, Ferencz, 1954
- Jours et Nuits d’Amérique, Georges Nizet, 1954
- Visas pour l’Amérique du Sud, Gallimar 1956
- Pueblo, Julliard, 1957
- J’ai vu vivre le Japon, Fayard, 1958
- Panoramas mexicains, Fayard, 1960
- La Camargue, Prix Carlos de Lazerme, Benjamin Arthaud, 1961
- The Return (Le Retour), Grand Prix du roman de l'Académie française, Julliard, 1964
- Les Compagnons de la Forêt-Noire, Julliard, 1966, Tome 1 de la série "le temps des hommes"
- La Fille de l’ancre bleue, Solar,1967
- L’Orient perdu, Julliard, 1969, Tome 2 de la série "le temps des hommes"
- L’Homme du destin, Larrieu-Bonnel,1972
- La Ville blanche, Julliard, 1973, Tome 3 de la série "le temps des hommes"
- La coupe est pleine, France-Empire, 1975
- La Mort du connétable, Julliard, 1976, Tome 4 de la série "le temps des hommes"
- Les Feux du crépuscule, Plon, 1977
- Les Clartés du jour, Plon, 1978
- Le Lion et le Marabout, Plon, 1979
- Les Lueurs de l’aube, Plon, 1981
- Une plume et un micro, Plon, 1982
- Et maintenant si nous parlions de l’Afrique du Sud, Plon, 1983
- Une fois la nuit venue, Plon, 1984
- Lettre ouverte à ceux qui en ont plus qu’assez du socialisme, Albin Michel, 1985
- La Rivière de la guerre, Julliard, 1985
- Le Fils unique, Plon, 1988
- Le Rendez-vous d’Elchingen, Plon, 1990
- Nous parlerons de Rome, Le Fallois, 1992
- Le Temps d’apprendre à vivre, Le Rocher, 1993
- Le Temps qui tient au cœur, Le Rocher, 1996
