= Paule Régnier =

French writer (1888–1950)

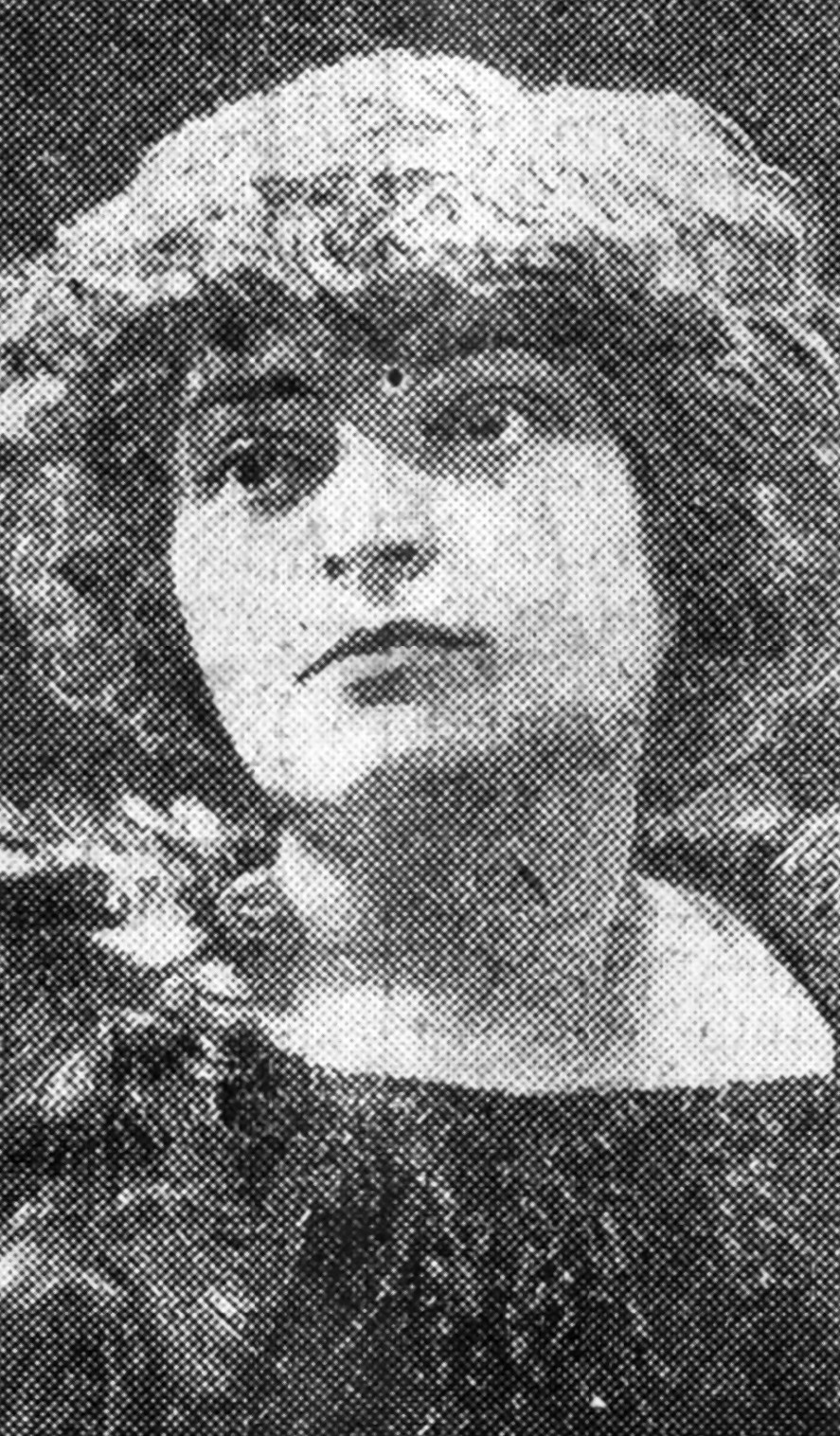
Paule Régnier, 1924 photograph

Paule Joseph Marie Eugénie Charlotte Régnier (19 June 1888 in Fontainebleau (Seine-et-Marne) – 1 December 1950 in Meudon (Hauts-de-Seine) was a French writer, laureate of the Grand prix du roman de l'Académie française in 1934.

== Biography ==
Paule Regnier grew up in Versailles, where her father, a career officer, had been sent in 1890, and where he left his family when the obligations of the military profession caused him to change his residence. After the death of her father in 1902, her mother moved with her and her two older sisters to Paris. After the marriage of these, Paule Regnier remained alone with her mother until the death of the latter in 1926.

== Works ==
- 1913: Octave
- 1924: La Vivante Paix
- 1929: Heureuse Faute
- 1919: Marcelle, faible femme
- 1930: Le Roi Mage de Maillezais
- 1931: Petite et Nadie
- 1933: L'Abbaye d'Évolayne – Grand prix du roman de l'Académie française
- 1936: Cherchez la joie
- 1941: Tentation
- 1942: L'Expérience d'Alain
- 1945: Ce qui fait le bonheur
- 1946: L'Aventure d'Hermione Capulet
- 1947: La Face voilée, essay on pain, followed by Plaintes dans la nuit
- 1949: Les Filets de la mer

Posthumous publications

- 1953: Journal, foreword by Jacques Madaule
- 1956: Fêtes et Nuages, chronique d'une enfance
- 1956: Lettres
