= Gabriel d'Aubarède =

French writer and literary critic (1898–1995)

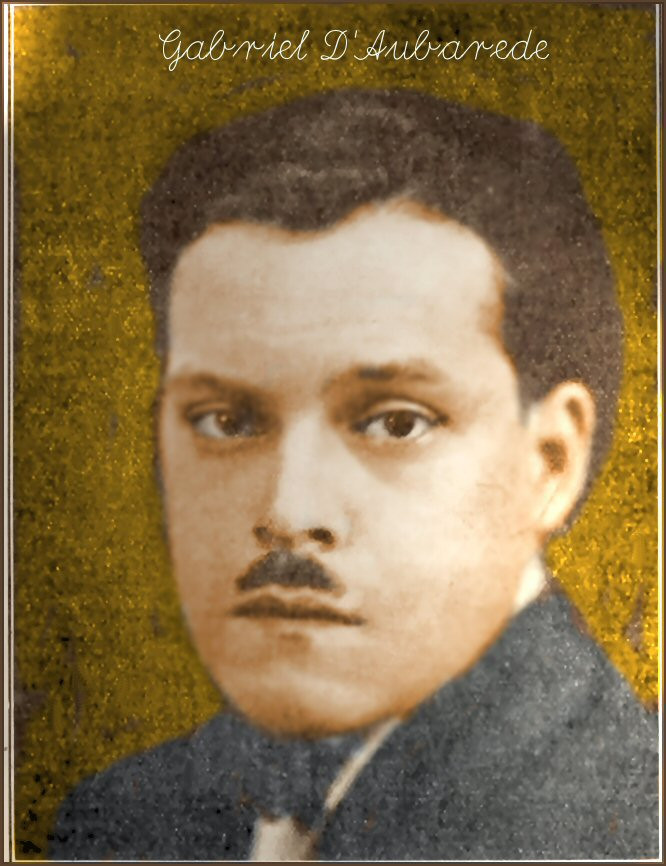
- Born: 28 September 1898; Marseille, France
- Died: 31 December 1995 (aged 97); Paris, France
- Occupations: Novelist; literary critic; journalist

Gabriel d'Aubarède (28 September 1898 – 31 December 1995) was a French novelist, literary critic and journalist. His 1959 novel La Foi de notre enfance won the Grand Prix du roman de l'Académie française.

== Biography ==
Gabriel Paul Marie Joseph d'Aubarède was the son of Paul d'Aubarède, a banker, and Magdeleine Benet (daughter of a lawyer who became a notary), the second of thirteen children. The d'Aubarèdes belonged to a Lyon family that was ennobled in 1677 by the city council. His paternal grandparents were Paul d'Aubarède, municipal tax collector and treasurer of the city of Lyon, and Élisabeth Aynard, the latter being the daughter of Henry Aynard (1796-1866), general councilor of the Ain department, president of the Tribunal de commerce, and censor of the Bank of France in Lyon, who came from the bourgeois family that had founded the Maison Aynard et fils in the 18th century.

A childhood friend of Marcel Pagnol, he co-founded a magazine with him in 1914 called Fortunio, which he edited for a time and which later became Les Cahiers du Sud. He published a dozen books and was also a literary critic and journalist, notably for Les Nouvelles littéraires. He was a member of the Société des gens de lettres and the Association des écrivains catholiques.

He was married to Louise Léontine Androt (1897–1964) and then, in 1952, to Marie-Marthe des Mazis (1910–2005).

== Work ==
- 1943: Honnorin ou le mauvais esprit, éditions Gallimard
- 1946: La Révolution des saints, Gallimard
- 1948: L'oncle Fred n'est plus jeune, Gallimard
- 1959: La Foi de notre enfance, éditions Flammarion, Grand prix du roman de l'Académie française
- 2004: De mémoire d'oublié (illustrations by Roger Wild), éditions La Table Ronde
