= Rodolphe Julian =

French painter, etcher and pedagogue, founder of the Académie Julian (1839–1907)

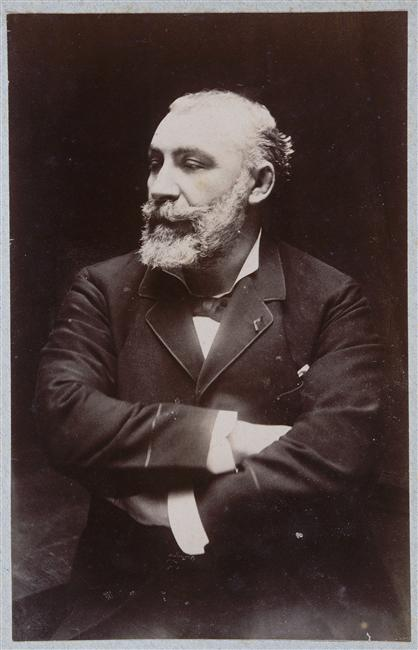
- Born: 13 June 1839; Lapalud, France
- Died: 2 February 1907 (aged 67)
- Education: Léon Cogniet, Alexandre Cabanel; École des Beaux-Arts
- Known for: Painting, etching, education
- Awards: Legion of Honour

Pierre Louis Rodolphe Julian (13 June 1839 – 2 February 1907) born in Lapalud southeastern France was a French painter, etcher and professor, founder and director of the Académie Julian in Paris. The writer André Corthis (1882–1952), winner of the 1906 edition of the Prix Femina was his niece.

== Biography ==
Julian worked as an employee in a bookstore in Marseille. He was interested in sports, particularly wrestling. Julian went to Paris, where he became a student of Léon Cogniet and Alexandre Cabanel, professor at the École des Beaux-Arts, without being enrolled there.

In 1863 he exhibited for the first time in the salons.

He married the painter Amélie Beaury-Saurel in 1895.

The challenges that he faced when in Paris led him to found in 1868, a private art academy, the Académie Julian who also offered training to foreign artists and women who had little access to the official academy. The purpose was to prepare students for entry to the École des Beaux-Arts.

Julian was described by the Anglo-Irish novelist and critic George Moore as "a kind of Hercules, dark-haired, strong, with broad shoulders, short legs, a soft voice and all the charm of the Midi".

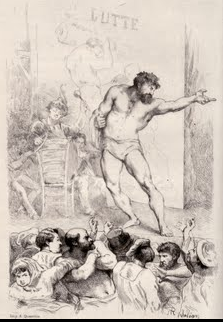
Ompdrailles - Le Tombeau des lutteurs - Rodolphe Julian

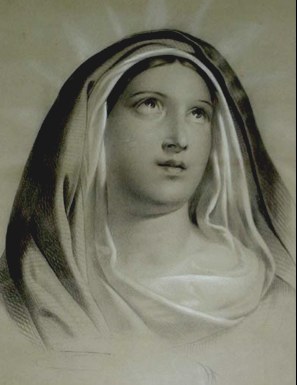
Madone - Rodolphe Julian

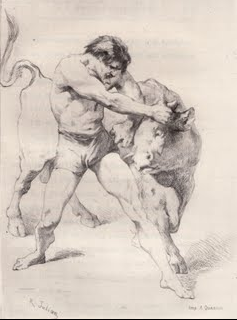
Ompdrailles - Le tombeau des lutteurs- Rodolphe Julian

== Collections ==
- San Francisco De Young (museum)
- British Museum

== Award ==
For his services to the arts, Rodolphe Julian Legion of Honour en 1881.

== Bibliography ==
- Léon Cladel; Jean-Pierre Deloux; Rodolphe Julian: "Ompdrailles : le tombeau-des-lutteurs", (ISBN 9782846080521) celebrating fighting tournaments practiced in Lapalud (Vaucluse), Julian's birthplace
- Martine Hérold: L'Académie Julian à cents ans. 1968 (in French).
- Catherine Fehrer; New Light on the Académie Julian and its founder (Rodolphe Julian). In: La Gazette des Beaux-Arts 6. Pér. 103, 1984

== See also ==
- Académie Julian

== Students ==
- Blanche Ostertag, an American decorative artist
- Marie Bashkirtseff, painter
