= The Set-Up (novel) =

1982 novels by Vladimir Volkoff

- Book cover in original French, Le montage (1982)
- Author: Vladimir Volkoff
- Original title: Le montage
- Translator: Alan Sheridan
- Language: French
- Publisher: Éditions L'Âge d'Homme
- Publication date: 1982
- Publication place: France
- English publication date: 1984
- Pages: 350
- ISBN: 2260003036

The Set-Up: A Novel of Espionage (French: Le montage) is a 1982 novel by the Russian-French writer Vladimir Volkoff. It portrays a Soviet spy who lives in Paris, where he works as a literary agent and manipulates intellectuals and journalists by appealing to their large egos.

Kirkus Reviews described it as "part thriller, part satire, part textbook, part political dialogue", and wrote that it succeeds as a polemical text but fails as a spy novel. The Washington Post called the scheming of the main character more confusing than chilling and wrote that much of the book is "a classroom exercise masquerading as a novel".

The book was awarded the 1982 Grand Prix du roman de l'Académie française.
