= Henri Coulonges =

French writer and painter (1936–2023)

- Born: Marc-Antoine de Dampierre; 11 July 1936; Deauville, France
- Died: 4 May 2023 (aged 86)
- Occupations: Writer; Painter

Marc-Antoine de Dampierre (11 July 1936 – 4 May 2023), better known by the pen name of Henri Coulonges, was a French writer and painter. He was the recipient of the Grand Prix du roman de l'Académie française and his works have been translated into 17 languages.

== Biography ==
Born in Deauville on 11 July 1936, Coulonges spent ten years writing for the magazine Connaissance des Arts. In 1975, his first novel, Les Rives de l'Irrawaddy, was published by Fayard. In spring 1979, he published his second novel, L'Adieu à la femme sauvage, which received press coverage in Le Canard enchaîné and received the Prix RTL grand public. At the end of the year, the novel won him the Grand Prix du roman de l'Académie française. The novel would be his greatest critical and commercial success, which received praise from the likes of Jean Mistler, Jean Clémentin, and Françoise Xenakis. Numerous film studios in the United States and the United Kingdom took interest in adapting the novel, but none of these plans materialized. Coulonges was up for another award from the Académie Française in 1997, but narrowly lost to Jean-François Revel.

Henri Coulonges died on 4 May 2023, at the age of 86.

== Works ==
- Les Rives de l'Irrawaddy (1975)
- L'Adieu à la femme sauvage (1979)
- À l'approche d'un soir du monde (1983)
- Les Frères Moraves (1987)
- La Lettre à Kirilenko (1989)
- La Marche hongroise (1992)
- Passage de la comète (1996)
- Six oies cendrées (2001)

== Decorations ==
- Cross for Military Valour
