= Foreign Words =

Foreign Words is a novel by Greek author Vassilis Alexakis that tells the story of middle-aged writer Nicolaides and his decision to learn the African language Sango following the death of his father. The novel was originally published in 2002 in France as Les mots étrangers, where it was short-listed for the Renaudot Prize and the Interallié Prize. It was then translated by the author and was published in 2004 as Oi xenes lexeis in Greece, where it won the prize for best Greek novel of the year. The English translation Foreign Words was done by Alyson Waters and was published by Autumn Hill Books in 2006.

== Background ==
Vassilis Alexakis, like his protagonist Nicolaides, is a Greek writer who relocated to France, writing and translating between his native and adopted languages. The inspiration for Foreign Words comes from his own experience studying Sango after the death of his father in 1995. Foreign Words, published by Autumn Hill Books in 2006, is Alexakis’ first work to appear in English. It was published in the US with help from the National Endowment for the Arts as well as the French ministry of Foreign Affairs and the Cultural Services of the French Embassy in the United States.

== Premise ==
Foreign Words tells the story of Nicolaides, a Greek writer living in Paris, whose father has recently died. His latest novel has not done well in France, and he has not been writing anything new. He decides he wants to learn a new language, a little-known African language. After being introduced to linguists Paul-Marie and Mathilde Bourquin, Nicolaides settles on Sango, spoken in the Central African Republic (CAR), as his choice. With the help of a dictionary and a textbook, Nicolaides happily delves into his study of Sango, his obsession somewhat like infatuation.

=== Characters ===
- Nicolaides is the protagonist and narrator of Foreign Words. He is a Greek novelist living in France who writes in both French and Greek and translates between them.
- Georges is Nicolaides’ French publisher. It is later revealed that he has an adopted daughter from Africa.
- Jean Fergusson is Nicolaides’ friend, an ethnologist and journalist who is battling skin cancer when the main action of the novel takes place. He has a relationship with a woman named Sandra, with whom he conceives a child and marries.
- Alice is a married woman with whom Nicolaides has an on-again, off-again affair.
- Paul-Marie and Mathilde Bourquin are an older married couple of linguists Nicolaides meets through his friend Jean Fergusson. They are the ones who introduce him to Sango and give him a dictionary, which was co-written by Mathilde.
- Marcel Alingbindo is a native of the CAR living in France with his wife and some of his children, although he has other children who are still back in Africa. He teaches Nicolaides about the use of tones in Sango and how messages can be communicated through whistling, if done correctly.
- Esther is a young, attractive waitress at a restaurant in Bangui.

=== Significant locations ===
- Paris and other parts of France
- Athens, Greece
- Bangui, Central African Republic

=== Major themes ===
- Loss and aging – the story of a man working through the grief of losing his father. Nicolaides also has to grapple with the fact that he himself is aging.
- Language – Intertwined with the other themes of the book is the permeating idea of language, old languages and new, how they can blend together or how one can dominate another.
