= André Corthis =

French writer (1882-1952)

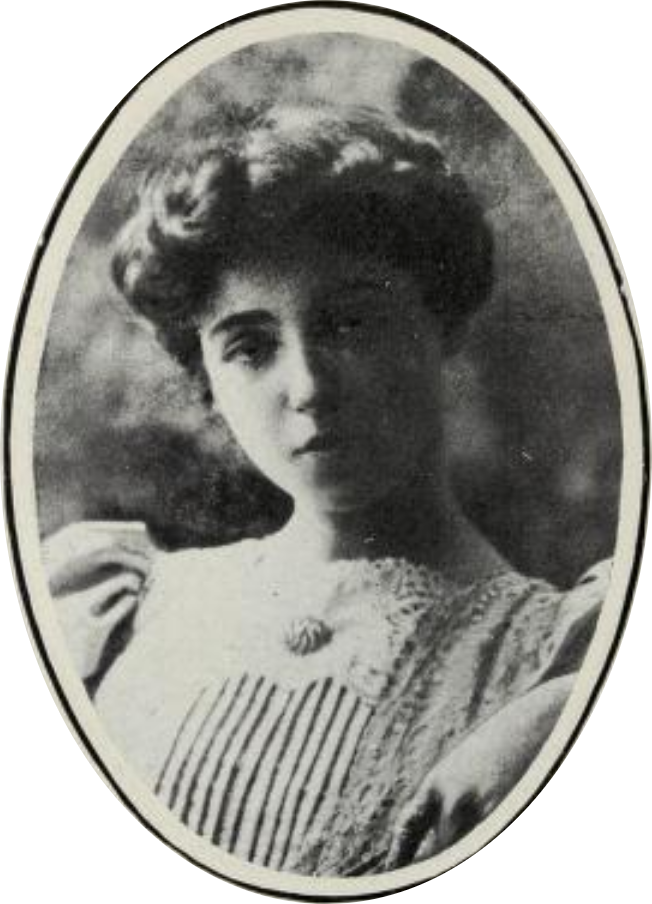
- Born: Andrée Magdeleine Husson; 15 April 1882; 8th arrondissement of Paris
- Died: 16 August 1957 (aged 84); 17th arrondissement of Paris
- Occupation: Writer

André Corthis, née Andrée Magdeleine Husson (15 April 1882 – 8 August 1952) was a 20th-century French writer. She received the prix Femina in 1906. Andrée Husson is the niece of painter Rodolphe Julian.

== Biography ==
Andrée Husson spent part of her youth in Spain, a country she often evoked. At the age of twelve, she began to line up rhymes and compose poems. In June 1906, totally unknown at 21, she published her first volume of verse: Gemmes et Moires. Six months later, all the illustrated magazines published her portrait and all the newspapers printed her name. She had just received a literary prize, the Prix Femina, awarded annually by the female jury of the great social magazine of the time: La Vie heureuse and the sum of 5000 francs. She did not hide the influence of her masters: Charles Baudelaire, Henri de Régnier, and overall Paul Verlaine.

Andrée Husson married Raymond Lécuyer. She inherited the Académie Julian, the art gallery created in 1868 by her uncle, the painter Rodolphe Julian. After being closed during the war of 1939-1945, the Académie Julian was sold by Andrée Husson to Cécile Beldent and André Del Debbio (1908–2010) to again be opened on Saturday 12 October 1946.

Her work L'Espagne de la victoire was an ode to Francoist Spain.

== Selected work ==
- 1906: Gemmes et Moires, collection of poetry, Éditions Fasquelle — Prix Femina
- 1908: Mademoiselle Arguillis (Fasquelle)
- 1910: Le Pauvre Amour de Doña Balbine (Fasquelle)
- 1914: Le Pardon prématuré (Fasquelle)
- 1917: Petites Vies dans la tourmente (Éditions Pierre Lafitte)
- 1919: Pour moi seule, novel, Albin Michel, coll. "Le Roman littéraire" — Grand prix du roman de l'Académie française
- 1920: Sa vraie femme (Fasquelle)
- 1920: La Marâtre, Albin Michel
- 1921: L'Obsédé, Albin Michel
- 1923: L'Entraîneuse, novel, Albin Michel
- 1925: Le Pardon prématuré, Joseph-Arthème Fayard, Collection : Le Livre de demain; 9
- 1926: Victime expiatoire, novel, Arthème Fayard et Cie; coll. "Le Livre de demain"; 41
- 1927: Tourmentes (Fayard - Le Livre de Demain)
- 1928: Les Rameaux rouges, Éditions Hachette, coll. "Bibliothèque bleue"
- 1928: Passion, Fayard et Cie éditeurs
- 1928: La Danseuse impassible (Les Éditions des portiques)
- 1929: La Fiancée perdue (A. Fayard et Cie)
- 1930: Pèlerinages en Espagne : Saint-Jacques de Compostelle, Salamanque, Tolède, Saragosse (Fasquelle)
- 1930: La Nuit incertaine (Bibliothèque-Charpentier, Fasquelle éditeurs)
- 1931: Soledad, novel (Albin Michel)
- 1932: Appel de flammes, novel (Albin Michel)
- 1934: Le Printemps sous l'orage, novel, Arthème Fayard et Cie
- 1935: Le Merveilleux Retour (Albin Michel)
- 1936: Du couvent aux Cortès (Arthème Fayard)
- 1936: Le Cœur forcé, Éditions Gallimard, coll. "La Renaissance de la nouvelle"
- 1937: La Chouette écartelée, Arthème Fayard
- 1938: Révoltées (Les Éditions de France)
- 1938: Masques, A. Fayard
- 1939: Cris dans le ciel, A. Fayard
- 1941: Destinées, A. Fayard
- 1941: L'Espagne de la victoire, A. Fayard
- 1944: L'Otage, A. Fayard
- 1945: Séverine, A. Fayard
- 1946: Lettres anonymes, A. Fayard
- 1949: Le Mystère des Trois-Gours, A. Fayard
- 1951: La Mesure d'aimer, A. Fayard
