= Vassilis Alexakis =

Greek writer (1943–2021)

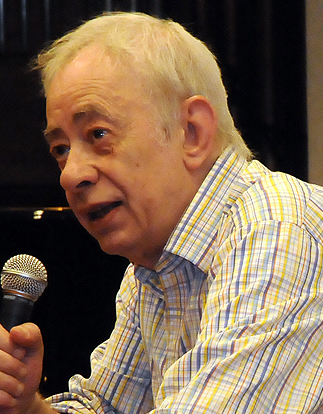
- Born: 25 December 1943; Athens, Greece
- Died: 11 January 2021 (aged 77); Athens, Greece
- Occupations: Writer, translator
- Writing career
- Period: 20th/21st century

Vassilis Alexakis (Greek: Βασίλης Αλεξάκης; 25 December 1943 – 11 January 2021) was a Greek-French writer and self-translator of numerous novels in Greek, his mother tongue, and French.

== Biography ==
Alexakis, the son of actor Giannis Alexakis, was born in Greece. He first came to France in 1961 to study journalism at the university in Lille and returned to Greece in 1964 to perform his military service. Because of the military junta, he went into exile to Paris in 1968 and stayed. He spent most of his time in Paris but also travelled regularly to Greece. Part of his experiences of his military service in the experimental Armed Forces Television (TED) was depicted in the cult Greek 1984 film Loafing and Camouflage, directed by Nikos Perakis, who served alongside Alexakis in TED. Alexakis' analogue is Pvt. Savidis, played by Giannis Chatziyannis.

In his literary work he continued to draw from both Greek and French culture. In 1974 he published his first book Le Sandwich, written in French. The first book directly written in Greek was Talgo, published in 1981. By writing Talgo and later on La langue maternelle directly in Greek, he wanted to prove to himself that he was still able to write in his mother tongue. He self-translated Talgo into French and since then he wrote each book in French and Greek. In darkly humorous prose, he combined autobiography, history, fantasy, and suspense. In 2006, Les mots étrangers was translated by Alyson Waters and published under the title Foreign Words; this was the first of his novels to be translated into English. In 1995, he received the prestigious Prix Médicis for La langue maternelle. In 2007, he received the Grand Prix du roman de l'Académie française for Ap. J.-C..

He died on 11 January 2021 after a long battle with cancer.

== Works in French ==
- 1974: Le Sandwich. Paris: Julliard.
- 1975: Les Girls de City-Boum-Boum. Paris: Julliard.
- 1978: La Tête du chat. Paris: Le Seuil.
- 1978: Mon amour! Città Armoniosa.
- 1985: Contrôle d’Identité. Paris: Le Seuil.
- 1987: Le fils de King Kong. Geneva: Les Yeux ouverts.
- 1989: Paris-Athènes. Paris: Le Seuil.
- 1992: Avant. Paris: Le Seuil. (Prix Albert Camus, Prix Charles-Exbrayat, Prix Alexandre-Vialatte)
- 1995: La lange maternelle. Paris: Fayard. (self-translation of Η Μητρική γλώσσα, Prix Médicis)
- 1997: Papa. Paris: Fayard. (Erzählung, Prix de la Nouvelle de l’Académie française)
- 1997: L’invention du baiser. Geneva: Nomades.
- 1999: Le colin d’Alaska
- 2002: Les mots étrangers. Paris: Stock. Translated into English by Alison Waters as Foreign Words
- 2005: Je t’oublierai tous les jours. Paris: Stock.
- 2007: Ap. J.-C. Paris: Stock. (Grand Prix du roman de l'Académie française)
- 2010: Le premier mot Paris: Stock.
- 2012: L'enfant grec. Paris: Stock.

== Works in Greek ==
- 1980: Tάλγκο. Athenes: Exantas.
- 1995: Η Μητρική γλώσσα
- 1999: Η καρδιά
