= Arléa =

French publishing house

- Founded: 1986; 40 years ago
- Country of origin: France
- Headquarters location: Paris
- Publication types: Books
- Fiction genres: Littérature, littérature étrangère, classiques antiques, essais.
- Imprints: 1er Mille, La rencontre, Arléa-poche, Retour aux grands textes, Poche-Retour aux grands textes, Post-scriptum
- Official website: https://www.arlea.fr/

Arléa is a French publishing house created in 1986.

Arléa publishes thirty new titles each year, including pocket ones. His catalog contains more than a thousand titles: the great classics of Antiquity (whether Greek, Latin, Hebrew, Sanskrit or Arabic texts), first novels, contemporary translations, travel stories, and history books. Arléa has its own paperback series.
