= Académie Julian =

Former art school in Paris, France

Coordinates: 48°52′16″N 2°20′30″E

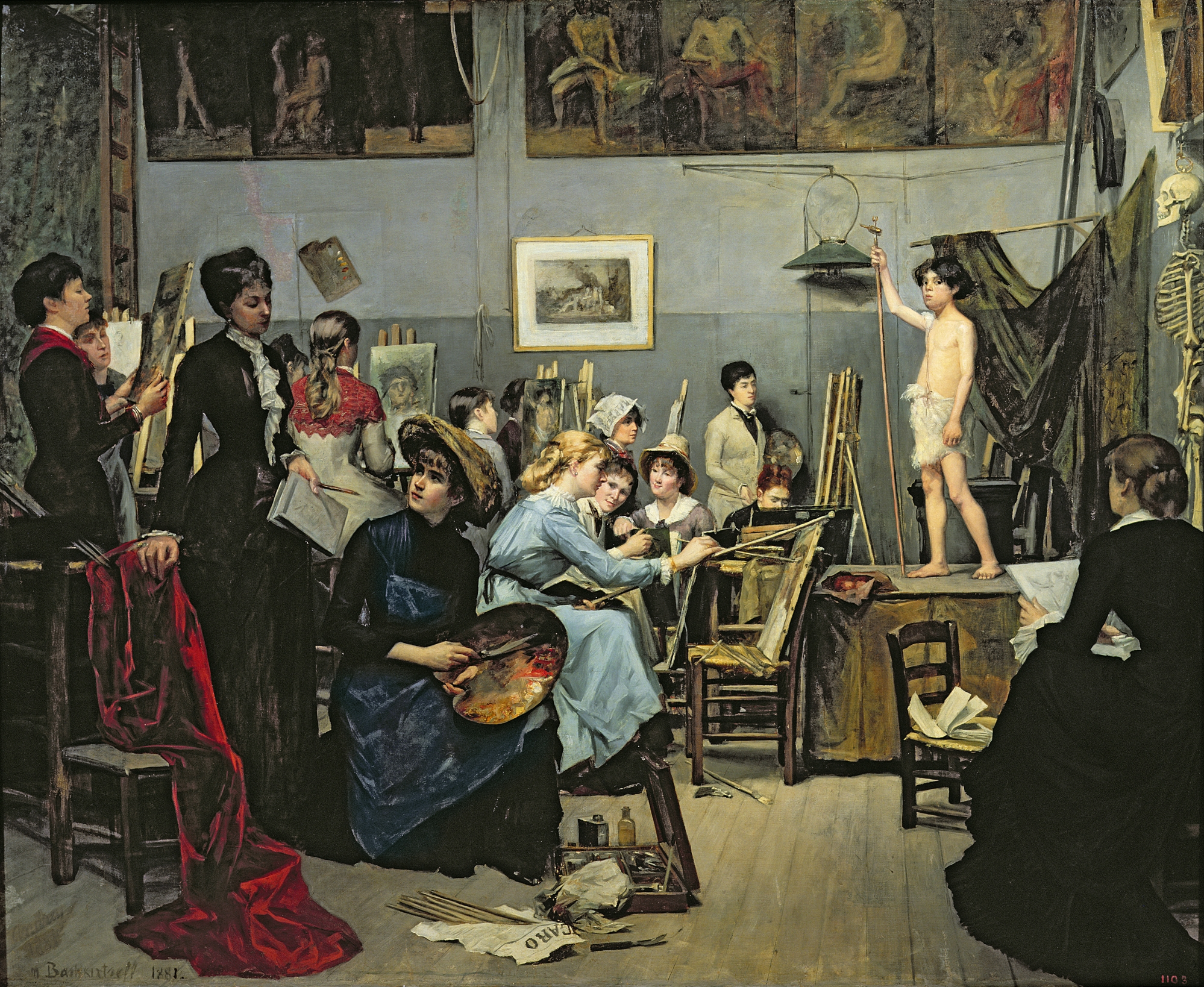
- The Studio, an 1881 portrait by Marie Bashkirtseff
- Type: Private art school
- Active: 1867–1968
- Founders: Rodolphe Julian
- Location: Paris, France

The Académie Julian (French pronunciation: [akademi ʒyljɑ̃]) was a private art school for painting and sculpture founded in Paris, France, in 1867 by French painter and teacher Rodolphe Julian (1839–1907). The school was active from 1868 through 1968. It remained famous for the number and quality of artists who attended during a great period of effervescence in the arts in the early twentieth century. After 1968, it integrated with the École supérieure de design, d'art graphique et d'architecture intérieure (ESAG) Penninghen.

== History ==
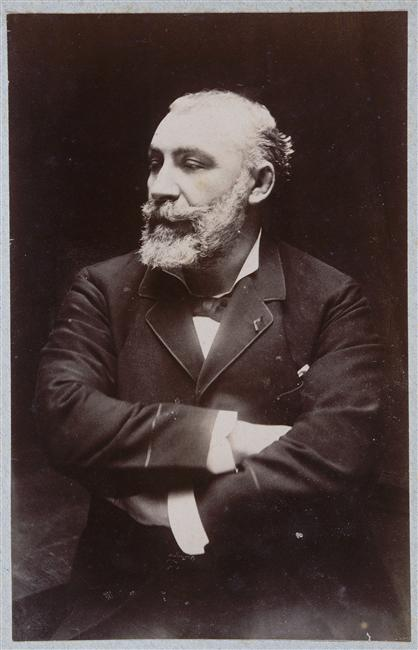
Rodolphe Julian (1839–1907), founder of the Académie Julian

Rodolphe Julian established the Académie Julian in 1868 at the Passage des Panoramas, as a private studio school for art students. The Académie Julian not only prepared students for the exams at the prestigious École des Beaux-Arts, but offered independent alternative education and training in arts. "Founded at a time when art was about to undergo a long series of crucial mutations, the Academie Julian played host to painters and sculptors of every kind and persuasion and never tried to make them hew to any one particular line".

In 1880, women who were not allowed to enroll for study to the École des Beaux-Arts were accepted by the new Académie Julian. Foreign applicants who had been deterred from entering the Ecole des Beaux Arts by a vicious French language examination were welcome at the Académie Julian. Men and women were trained separately, and women participated in the same studies as men, including drawing and painting of nude models. "Human exchange went forward in an atmosphere that was collegial, easygoing and mutually supportive. It nurtured some of the best artists of the day".

Académie Julian became popular as fertile ground with French as well as foreign students from diverse backgrounds from all over the world, from the United Kingdom, Canada, Hungary, and particularly the United States; French art critic Egmont Arens wrote in 1924 that American art, at least for a period of time, reflected the teachings of Académie Julian. In 1989, on the occasion of the exhibition at the Shepherd Gallery, in Manhattan, devoted to the Academie Julian in Paris as it existed between 1868 and 1939, John Russell wrote:

By my count, more than 50 nationalities were represented at the school during its glory years. To be at the Academie Julian was to be exposed to a kind of white magic that seems to have worked in almost every case. What was learned there stayed forever with alumnus and alumna, and it related as much to the conduct of life as to the uses of brush and chisel. – in The New York Times, John Russell: "An Art School That Also Taught Life", 19 March 1989.

The South African painter Strat Caldecott (1886–1929) worked and studied at the Académie Julian in preparation for his admission to the Ecole Nationale des Beaux-Arts. He vividly described the Académie Julian as: "A huge room, lighted from above, and smelling strongly of turpentine; tobacco-smoke, sweat and garlic, for the models were mostly children of the South. A room plastered to the full height of a man's reach with palette scrapings whose many colours mingled to make a warm grey background, hung with the prize studies of decades of concourse, furnished with a huge Godin stove, and tall grass-plaited stools, and a heavy mobile podium on which the model was posed each week by a quarreling agora of tousle-headed youths."

The early success of the Académie was also secured by the famous and respected artists whom Rodolphe Julian employed as instructors: Adolphe William Bouguereau (1825–1905), Henri Royer, Jean-Paul Laurens, Gabriel Ferrier, Tony Robert-Fleury, Jules Lefebvre, and other leading artists of that time trained in Academic art. Eventually, Académie Julian students were granted the right to compete for the Prix de Rome, a prize awarded to promising young artists and to participate in the major "Salons" or art exhibitions.

In the late 19th century the term L'art pompier had entered the scene as a derisive term for the traditional academic art espoused by the Académie's instructors. As a result, the Académie Julian embraced a more liberal regime pushing a less conservative, more sincere approach to art which corresponded to the Secessionist art movement in Germany and the Vienna Secession in Austria. It was followed and fully articulated by the Nabis, an avant-garde movement that participated in paving the way to modern art in 1888–1889.

Over time, Académie Julian opened schools in other locations. In addition to the original school at Passage des Panoramas, studios were at no. 5 Rue de Berri in the 8th arrondissement, no. 31 Rue du Dragon in the 6th arrondissement, and no. 51 rue Vivienne in the 2nd arrondissement for female student artists, overseen by painter Amélie Beaury-Saurel, Julian's spouse. Subsequent faculty included former students (Edgar Chahine, for example).

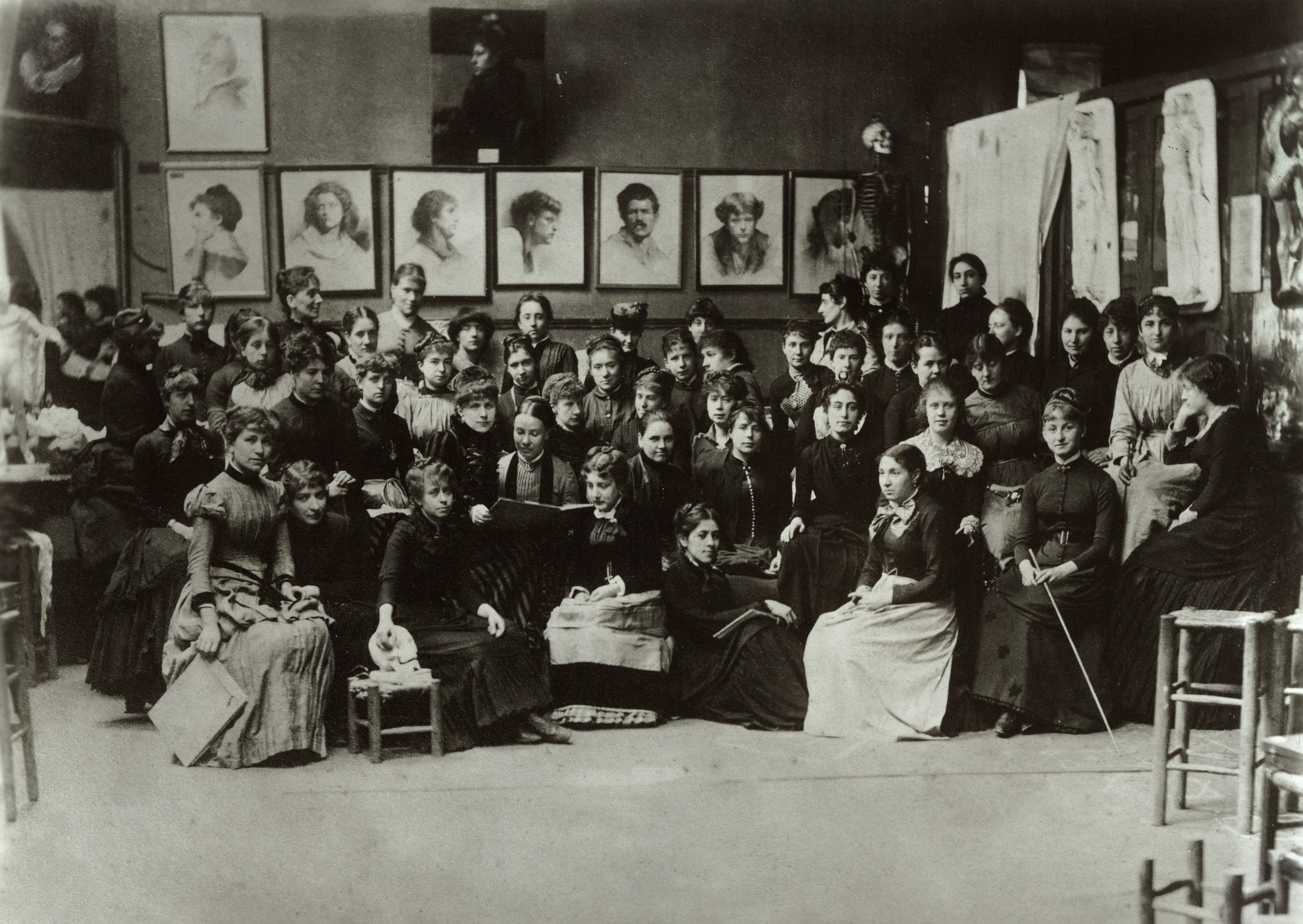
group of art students at Académie Julian

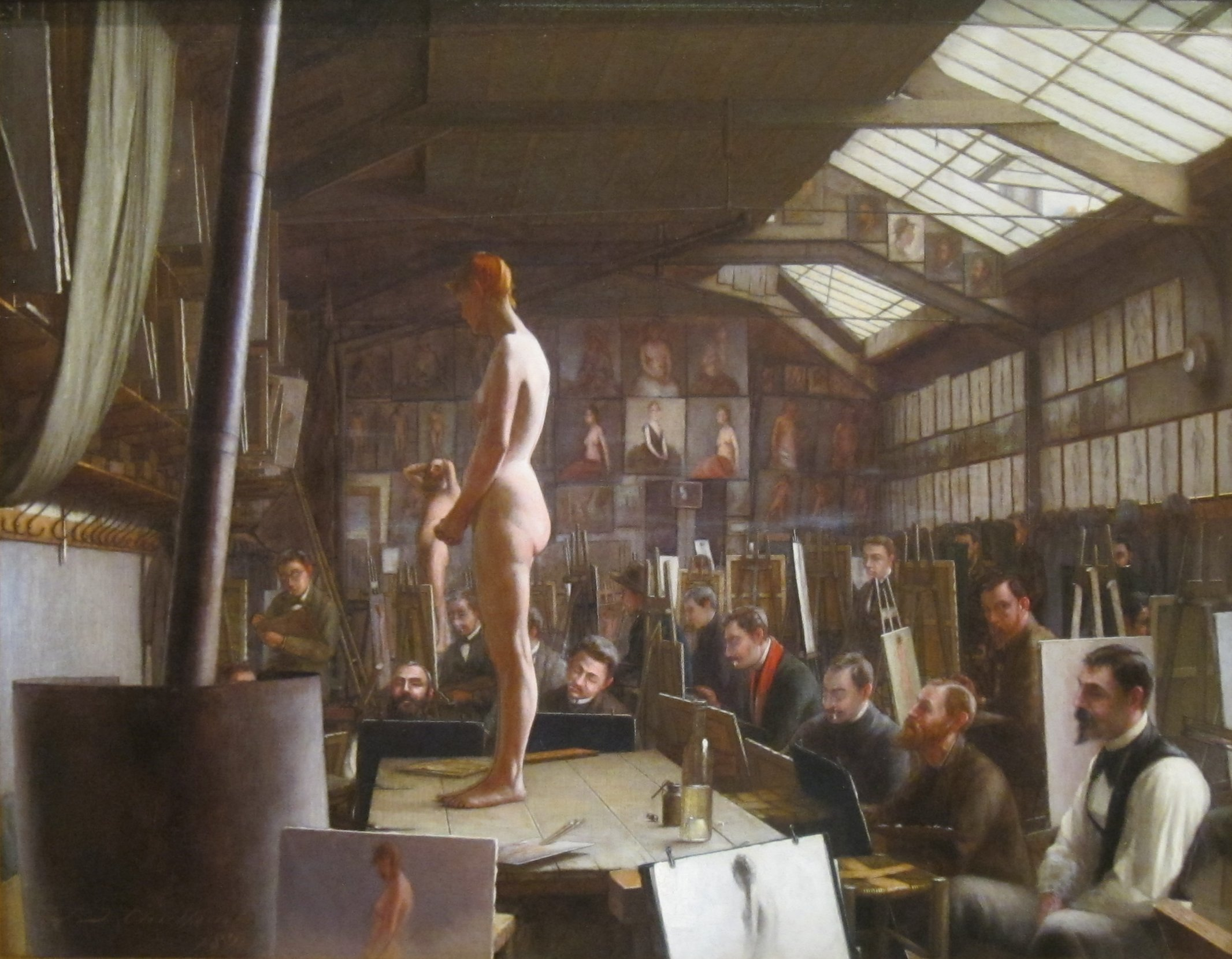
'Bouguereau's Atelier at Académie Julian

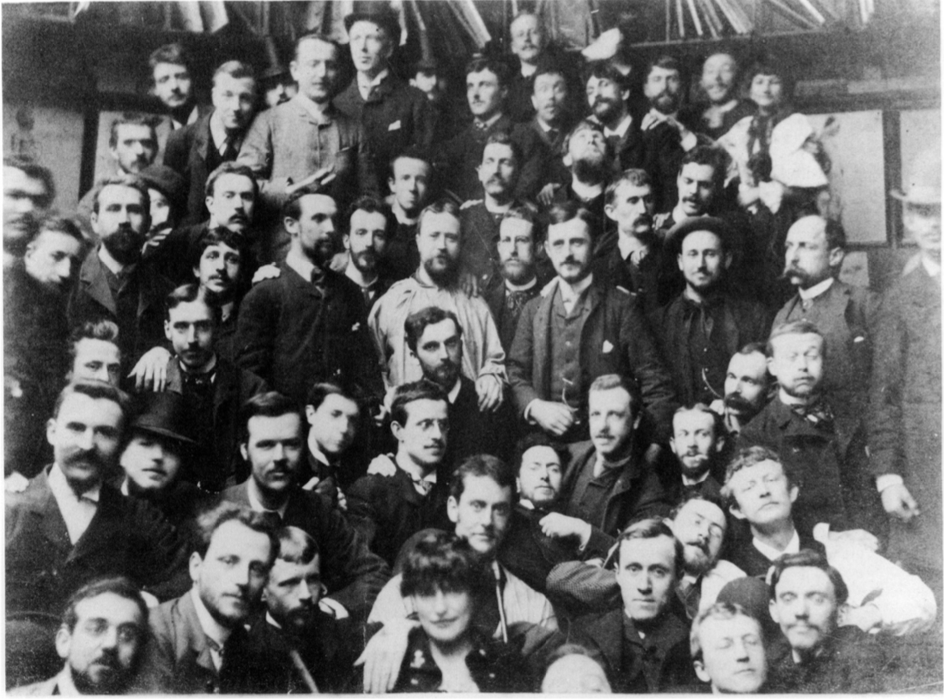
1886, group portrait, Académie Julian

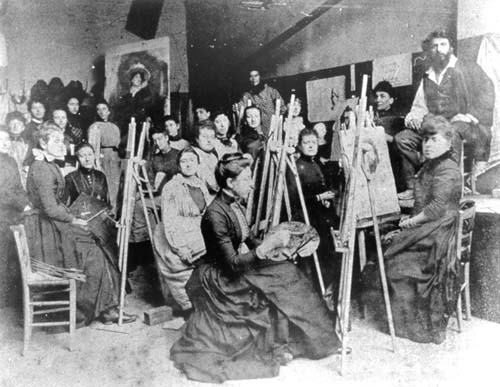
Académie Julian

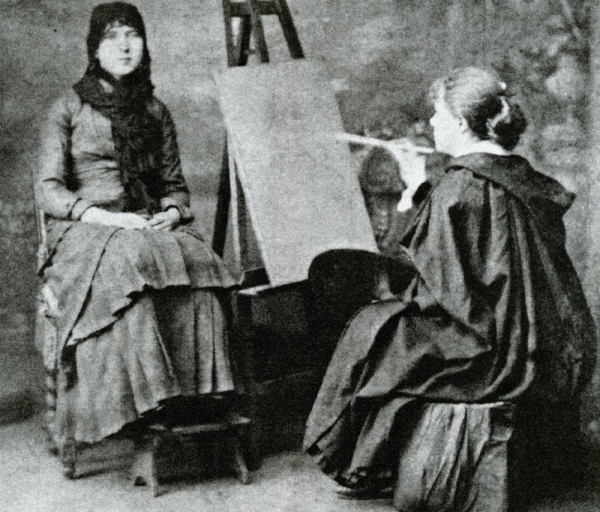
Marie Bashkirtseff – Académie Julian

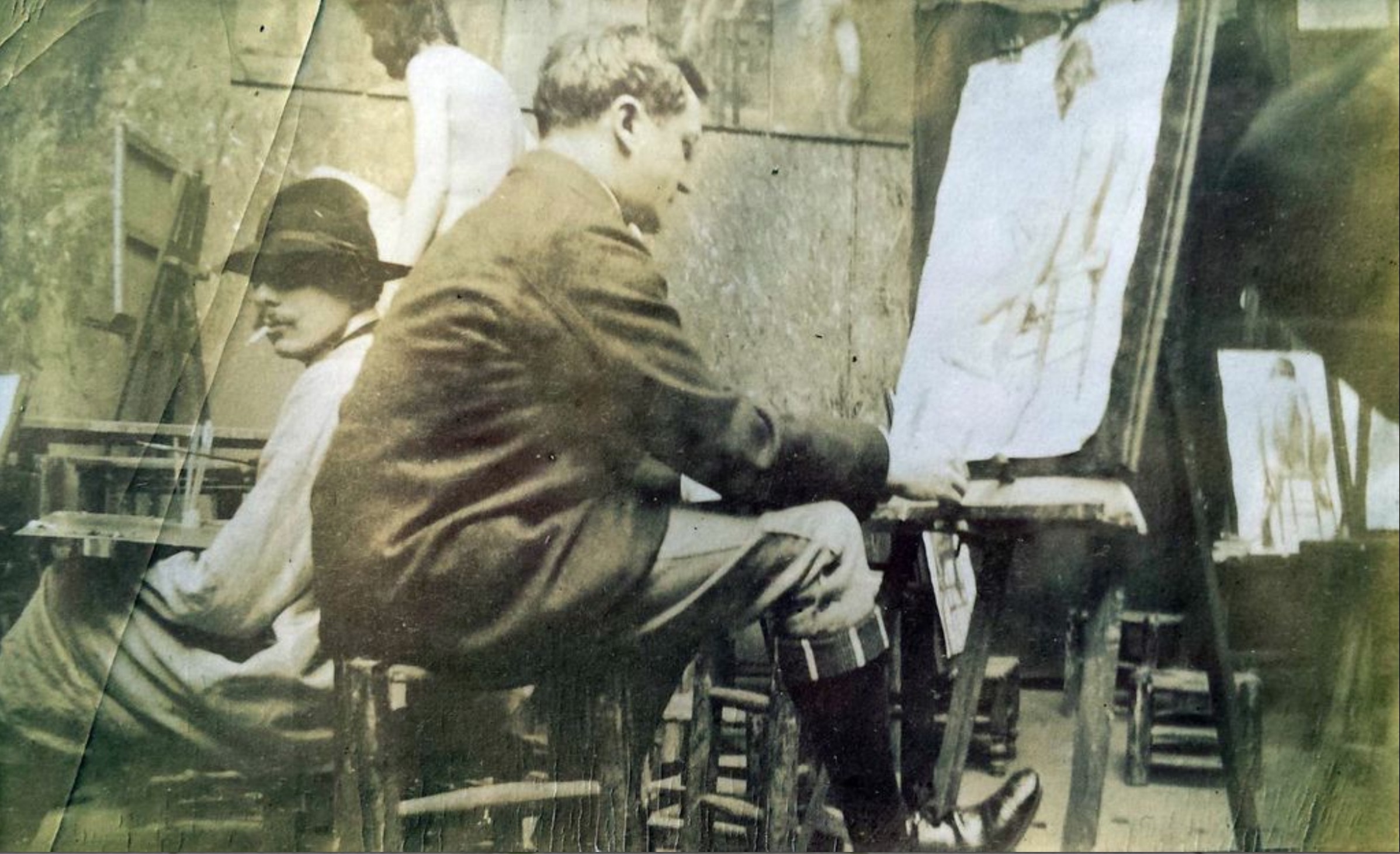
Rob Wagner training at the Académie Julian in 1903

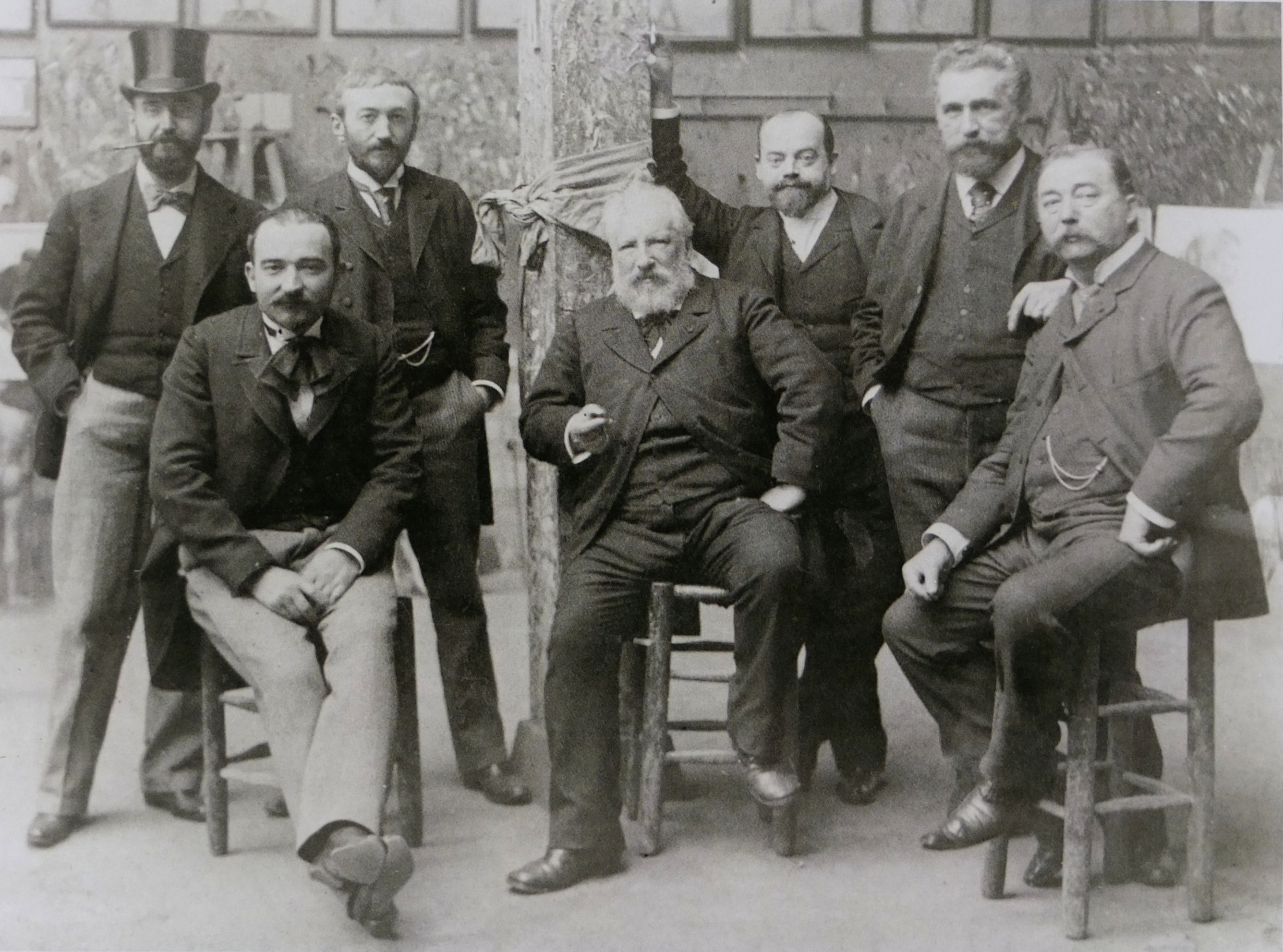
Teachers at Académie Julian c. 1892

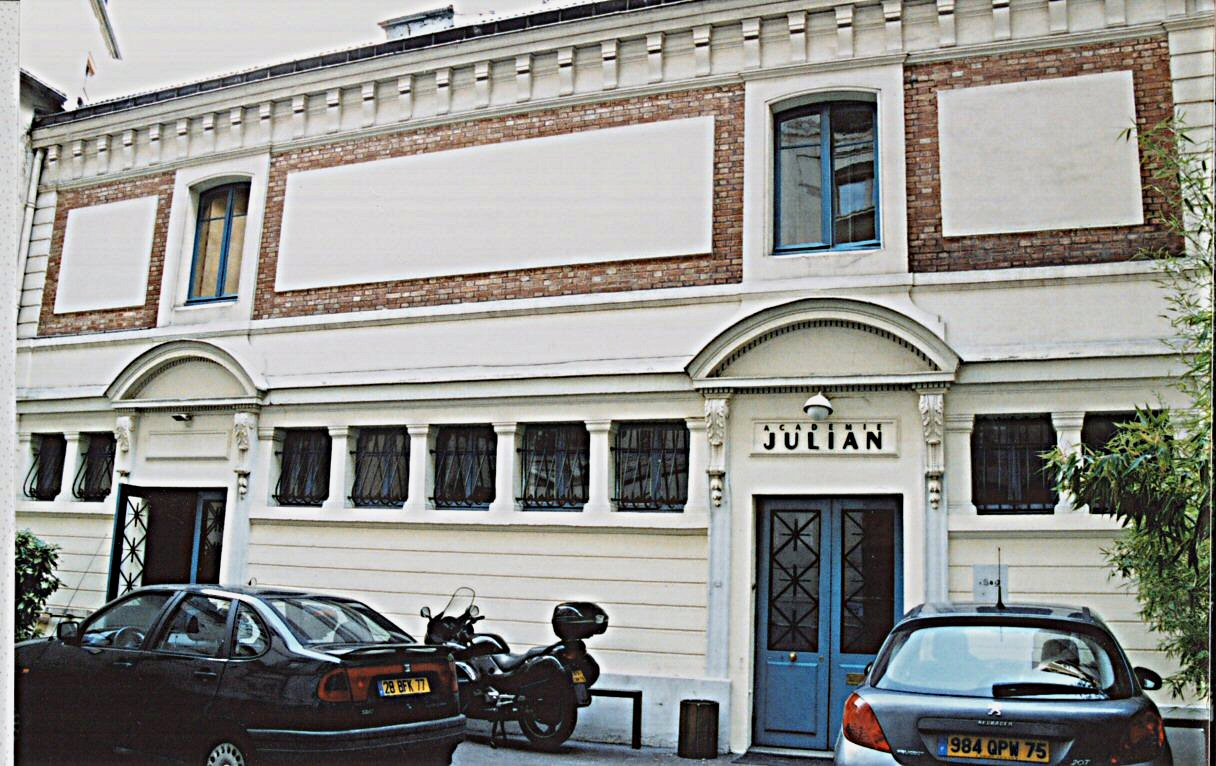
Académie Julian sur la rue Du Dragon à Paris, 2007

Académie Julian remained open during World War I, albeit with fewer students. By contrast during World War II, after the 1941 exhibition Vingt jeunes peintres de tradition française considerations on "degenerate art" by the German military administration forced the school to close. In 1946 some of the studios were sold.

For his services to the arts, Rodolphe Julian, described by the Anglo-Irish novelist and critic George Moore as a kind of Hercules, dark-haired, strong, with broad shoulders, short legs, a soft voice and all the charm of the Midi was awarded the Legion of Honour.

The artist records still extant are those of the men's section, covering the 1870–1932 period, and those of the women's section, covering the 1880–1907 period.

In 1968, an important year in France's history with the May events, particularly in relation to education, the Académie Julian integrated with ESAG (l'École suppérieure d'arts graphiques) Penninghen.

== See also ==
- Visual arts education
- School of Paris
- Impressionism
- Cubism
- Art Nouveau
- Fauvism
- Outsider art
- Modern art
- Modernism

== Bibliography ==
- (fr) Martine Hérold, L'Académie Julian a cent ans, 1968 [brochure commémorative des 100 années de l'Académie Julian]
- Catherine Fehrer, "New Light on the Académie Julian and its founder (Rodolphe Julian)", in La Gazette des Beaux-Arts, mai-juin 1984.
- Catherine Fehrer, The Julian Academy, Paris, 1868-1939 : spring exhibition, 1989, essays by Catherine Fehrer; exhibition organized by Robert and Elisabeth Kashey, New York, N.Y. (21 E. 84th St., New York) : Shepherd Gallery, vers 1989 [incluant la liste des artistes ayant fréquenté l'Académie ainsi que des professeurs].
- (fr) Larcher, Albert, Revivons nos belles années à l'Académie Julian 1919–1925, chez l'auteur, Auxerre, 1982.
- "Women at the Académie Julian in Paris" in The Burlington Magazine, Londres, CXXXVI, novembre 1994.
- Gabriel P. Weisberg and Jane R. Becker (editors), Overcoming All Obstacles : The Women of the Académie Julian, Dahesh Museum, New Brunswick, Rutgers University Press, New Jersey, 1999.
- Reid, Dennis R. (1988). A Concise History of Canadian Painting. Toronto: Oxford University Press. ISBN 978-0-19-540664-1; ISBN 978-0-19-540663-4; OCLC 18378555
