= Prix Bordin =

Award

The Prix Bordin (French pronunciation: [pʁi bɔʁdɛ̃]) is a series of prizes awarded annually by each of the five institutions making up the Institut Français since 1835.

== History ==
The prize was created by Charles-Laurent Bordin, a notary in Paris from 1794 to 1820, who bequeathed 12,000 Francs to the Institut de France in his testament dated April 7, 1835, for the foundation of an annual prize to be given to each of the five:

- the Académie Française, in order to "encourage high literature"; the prize was given irregularly until 1988
- the Académie des inscriptions et belles-lettres
- the French Academy of Sciences. The awarding of the prize is linked with a contest organized by the Academy.
- the Académie des Sciences morales et politiques : the biennial prize is awarded to "works treating upon subjects relating to the public interest, to the wellbeing of humanity, to the progress of science and to national honor (of France)."
- the Académie des Beaux-Arts: to reward works on painting, sculpture, architecture, engraving or music.

== Laureates of the Académie Française ==
=== From 1857 to 1899 ===
- 1857: Eugène Rosseeuw Saint-Hilaire for Histoire d'Espagne
- 1859: Nicolas Eugène Géruzez for Histoire de la littérature française depuis ses origines jusqu'à la Révolution et pendant la Révolution
- 1860: Louis Ratisbonne for Translation in verse of Dante
- 1861: André Sayous for Histoire de la littérature française à l'étranger pendant le XVIIIe siècle
- 1862:
  - Léon Halévy for his translation into verse of Greek tragedies
  - Auguste Lacaussade for Poèmes et Paysages
- 1863: Ferdinand Béchard for Droit municipal dans l'antiquité et Droit municipal au moyen âge
- 1865:
  - Jules Bonnet for Récits du XVIe siècle, Aonio Paleario, étude sur la Réforme en Italie and Olympia Morata
  - Eugène Fallex for his translation into verse of Aristophanes
  - Édélestand Pontas du Méril for Histoire de la comédie
  - Eugène Rosseeuw Saint-Hilaire for Histoire d'Espagne
- 1866: Alphonse Dantier for Les monastères bénédictins d'Italie
- 1867: Elme-Marie Caro for La philosophie de Gœthe
- 1868: Emmanuel Henri Victurnien de Noailles for Henri de Valois and la Pologne en 1572
- 1869: Alexis Chassang for Le Spiritualisme et l’Idéal dans la poésie des Grecs
- 1870:
  - Guillaume-Alfred Heinrich for Histoire de la littérature allemande
  - Constant Martha for Poème de Lucrèce
- 1871: Alfred Fouillée for La philosophie de Platon
- 1872: Jules Gauthier for Histoire de Marie Stuart
- 1873: Georges Perrot for L’éloquence politique et judiciaire à Athènes
- 1874:
  - Adolphe Bossert for La littérature allemande au moyen âge et les origines de l’épopée germanique, Goethe, ses précurseurs et ses contemporains and Goethe et Schiller
  - Jules Sauzay for Histoire de la persécution révolutionnaire dans le département du Doubs de 1789 à 1801
- 1875: Gustave Desnoiresterres or Voltaire et la société française au XVIIIe siècle
- 1876:
  - Ernest Daudet for Histoire du ministère de M. de Martignac, sa vie politique et les dernières années de la Restauration
  - Jules Levallois for Corneille inconnu
- 1877: François-Régie Chantelauze for Marie Stuart, son procès et son exécution
- 1878:
  - Arthur Gobineau for La Renaissance
  - Gustave Merlet for Tableau de la littérature française de 1800-1815
- 1879:
  - Ernest Lichtenberger for Étude sur les poésies lyriques de Goethe
  - Charles Schmidt for Histoire littéraire de l’Alsace
- 1880: Henri Baudrillart for Histoire du luxe privé et public depuis l’antiquité jusqu’à nos jours
- 1881:
  - (the widow of) Paul Albert
  - Émile Gebhart for Les origines de la Renaissance
  - Julian Klaczko for Causeries florentines
- 1882:
  - Georges Pallain for Correspondance inédite du prince de Talleyrand et du roi Louis XVIII pendant le Congrès de Vienne
  - Albert Vandal for Louis XV et Élisabeth de Russie
- 1883: Ferdinand Brunetière for Le roman naturaliste and Études critiques sur l’histoire de la littérature française
- 1884:
  - James Darmesteter Essais orientaux
  - Georges Duruy Le cardinal Carlo Carafa
- 1885:
  - Prince Emmanuel de Broglie for Fénelon à Cambrai, d’après sa correspondance (1699-1715)
  - François Laouënan for Le brahmanisme et ses rapports avec le judaïsme, le judaïsme et le christianisme
- 1886:
  - Charles Bénard La philosophie ancienne
  - Charles de Baillon Henriette-Anne d’Angleterre, duchesse d’Orléans
  - Gustave-Armand-Henri de Reiset for Modes et usages au temps de Marie-Antoinette
- 1887:
  - Émile Bérard-Varagnac for Portraits littéraires
  - Jacques Denis for La Comédie grecque
- 1888:
  - Prince Georges Bibesco for Au Mexique, 1862. Combats et retraite des Six Mille
  - Sofya Kovalevskaya for her work "Mémoire sur un cas particulier du problème de la rotation d'un corps pesant autour d'un point fixe, où l'intégration s'effectue à l'aide des fonctions ultraelliptiques du temps"
  - Stéphen Liégeard La côte d’Azur
  - René Millet La France provinciale
- 1889: Charles Ravaisson-Mollien Les manuscrits de Léonard de Vinci
- 1890:
  - Antonin Fabre for Chapelain et nos deux premières Académies
  - Alfred Marchand for Les poètes lyriques de l’Autriche
  - Maurice Paléologue for Vauvenargues
  - Gabriel Sarrazin for La Renaissance de la poésie anglaise (1798-1889) and les poètes modernes de l’Angleterre
  - Émile Simond for Histoire du 28e régiment de ligne
- 1891:
  - Georges Bengesco for Voltaire
  - Auguste Couat Aristophane et l’ancienne comédie attique
  - Théodore Reinach Mithridate Eupator, roi de Pont
- 1892:
  - Charles Ravaisson-Mollien Les manuscrits de Léonard de Vinci
  - Eugène Titeux for Histoire de la Maison militaire du Roy, de 1814 à 1830
- 1893:
  - Viscountess Bardonnet for Mémoires et souvenirs du baron Hyde de Neuville
  - Charles Dardier for Paul Rabaut, ses lettres à Antoine Court (1739-1755) and Paul Rabaut, ses lettres à divers (1744-1794)
  - Charles de Moüy L’ambassade du duc de Créqui (1662-1665)
  - Charles Lenthéric for Le Rhône, histoire d’un fleuve
- 1894:
  - Victor Cucheval for Histoire de l’éloquence romaine depuis la mort de Cicéron jusqu’à l’avènement de l’empereur Hadrien
  - Antoine Guillois for Le salon de Madame Helvétius. Cabanis et les idéologues
  - Hippolyte Parigot for Le théâtre d’hier
  - Auguste Rey for Les cahiers de Saint-Prix
  - Léopold Sudre for Les sources du roman de Renart
- 1895:
  - Clément de La Jonquière for L’armée à l’Académie
  - Théophile Funck-Brentano for L’homme et sa destinée
  - Jean-Jules Jusserand for Histoire littéraire du peuple anglais, des origines à la Renaissance
  - Théodore Gosselin for Paris révolutionnaire
- 1896:
  - Ferdinand Belin for Histoire de l’ancienne université de Provence : Aix
  - Robert de la Sizeranne for La peinture anglaise contemporaine
- 1897:
  - Henry Bordeaux for La Vie et l’Art
  - Francis de Pressensé for Le Cardinal Manning
  - Eugène Ritter for La famille et la jeunesse de Rousseau
- 1898:
  - Maurice de Fleury for Introduction à la médecine de l’esprit
  - Henri Druon for Histoire de l’éducation des princes dans la Maison des Bourbons de France
  - Georges Goyau for L’Allemagne religieuse : le Protestantisme
- 1899:
  - Henry Lapauze for Les pastels de De La Tour à Saint-Quentin
  - Constantin Lecigne for Brizeux, sa vie et ses œuvres

=== From 1900 to 1939 ===
- 1900:
  - Count Théodore Paul Émile Ducos for La mère du duc d’Enghien (1750-1822)
  - Émile Dupré-Lasale for Michel de l’Hospital (1555-1960)
  - Henri Lichtenberger for Richard Wagner, poète et penseur
  - Louis Maigron for Le Roman historique à l'époque romantique
  - Jean-Baptiste Mispoulet for La vie parlementaire à Rome sous la République
- 1901:
  - Henry Fouquier for Philosophie parisienne
  - Victor Giraud for Essais sur Taine, son œuvre et son influence
  - Georges Le Bidois for La vie dans la tragédie de Racine
- 1902:
  - André Bellessort La société japonaise
  - André le Breton for Le roman français au XIXe siècle avant Balzac
  - Édouard Ruel for Du sentiment artistique dans la morale de Montaigne
- 1903:
  - Paul Allard for Julien l’Apostat
  - Ignác Kont for Étude sur l’influence de la littérature française en Hongrie (1772-1896)
  - Adolphe Liéby for Étude sur le théâtre de Marie Joseph Chénier
  - Francisque Vial for L’enseignement secondaire et la démocratie
- 1904:
  - Victor de Swarte for Descartes directeur spirituel
  - Paul Gautier for Madame de Staël et Napoléon
  - Paul et Victor Glachant for Essai critique sur le théâtre de Victor Hugo
  - Gustave Michaut for Sainte-Beuve avant les lundis
- 1905:
  - Charles ab der Halden for Études de littérature canadienne française
  - Adolphe Bossert for Schopenhauer
  - René Canat for Du sentiment de la solitude morale chez les romantiques et les parnassiens
  - Émile Dard for Le général Choderlos de Laclos (1741-1803)
  - Paul Decharme for La critique des traditions religieuses chez les Grecs, des origines au temps de Plutarque
- 1906:
  - Alfred Barbeau for Une ville d’eaux anglaise au XVIIIe siècle
  - Philippe Godet for Madame de Charrière et ses amis (1740-1805)
  - Édouard Herriot for Madame Récamier et ses amis
  - Samuel Rocheblave for George Sand et sa fille d’après leur correspondance inédite
- 1907:
  - Jean Baruzi for Leibniz et l’organisation religieuse de la terre
  - Marc Citoleux for La poésie philosophique au XIXe siècle : Lamartine. Mme Ackermann
  - Camille Latteille for Joseph de Maistre et la Papauté
  - Julien Luchaire for Essai sur l'évolution intellectuelle de l'Italie, de 1815 à 1830
- 1908:
  - Albert Cassagne for La théorie de l’art pour l’art
  - Angelo De Gubernatis for La poésie amoureuse de la Renaissance italienne
  - Louis Delaruelle for Guillaume Budé
  - Guillaume Hüszar for Molière et l’Espagne
  - Clodius Piat for Les philosophes grecs : Socrate, Aristote, Platon
- 1909:
  - Jules Charrier for Claude Fauchet, évêque constitutionnel du Calvados (1744-1793)
  - Georges Dalmeyda for Goethe et le drame antique
  - René Radouant for Guillaume du Vair (1556-1596)
- 1910:
  - Joseph Dedieu for Montesquieu et la tradition politique anglaise en France
  - Charles Drouhet for Le poète François Mainard (1583-1646)
  - Gabriel Maugain for Étude sur l’évolution intellectuelle de l’Italie de 1657 à 1750 environ
  - François Vézinet for Molière, Florian et la littérature espagnole
- 1911:
  - Victor Giraud for Blaise Pascal. L’homme, l’œuvre, l’influence
  - Paul Hazard for La Révolution française et les lettres italiennes
  - Philippe Millet for La crise anglaise
  - Napoléon-Maurice Bernardin for L’abbé Frifillis
  - Alfred Jeanroy for Giosué Carducci, l’homme et le poète
  - Hippolyte Loiseau for L’évolution morale de Goethe. Les années de libre formation (1749-1794)
  - Émile Magne for Voiture et les origines de l’hôtel de Rambouillet (1597-1635)
  - Auguste Rochette for L’Alexandrin chez Victor Hugo
- 1913:
  - Louis-Frédéric Choisy for Alfred Tennyson, son spiritualisme, sa personnalité morale
  - Joseph Drouet for L’abbé de Saint-Pierre, l’homme et l’œuvre
  - Jean Lucas-Dubreton for La disgrâce de Nicolas Machiavel. Florence (1469-1527)
  - Charles Régismanset for Le bienfaiteur de la ville
- 1914:
  - Joseph-Émile Dresch for Le roman social en Allemagne (1850-1900)
  - Christian Maréchal for La famille de La Mennais sous l’ancien Régime et la Révolution
  - Jean Nesmy for Le roman de la forêt
  - Henry Prunières for L’opéra italien en France avant Lulli
- 1916:
  - Mr. Alline
  - Ernest-Amédée de Renty
  - François Gébelin
  - Marcel Godet for La Congrégation de Montaigu
  - Amédée Guiard
  - Joachim Merlant
  - Paul Peyre for Du droit et du devoir de l’éducation
  - André Ruplinger for Charles Bordes, membre de l'Académie de Lyon (1711-1781)
- 1917:
  - Louis Cario for Annette, un été au pays basque
  - Marcel Dupont for En campagne
  - Pompiliu Eliade for La Roumanie au XIXe siècle
  - René La Bruyère for Deux années de guerre navale
  - Léon Lahovary for Les Lauriers et les Glaives
- 1918:
  - Édouard Guyot for L’Angleterre (sa politique intérieure)
  - Albert Monod for De Pascal à Châteaubriand
  - Léon Rosenthal for Du romantisme au réalisme
  - Paul Van Tieghem for Ossian en France
- 1919:
  - Albert Chérel for Fénelon au XVIIIe siècle en France
  - Émile Ripert for La Renaissance provençale (1800-1860)
- 1920:
  - Albert Autin for La maison en deuil
  - A. Dutil for Les chars d’assaut
  - Casimir-Alexandre Fusil for La poésie scientifique de 1750 à nos jours
  - Édouard Guyot for H.-G. Wells
  - Raymonde Machard for Tu enfanteras
  - Jean Suberville for Le théâtre d’Edmond Rostand
  - Bénjamin Vallotton for Ceux de Barivier
- 1921:
  - Louis-Frédéric Choisy for Sainte-Beuve, l’homme et le poète
  - Pierre de Labriolle for Histoire de la littérature latine chrétienne
  - Léon Deffoux and Émile Zavie for Le groupe de Médan
  - Ernest Delahaye for Verlaine
  - L. Letellier for Louis Bouilhet, sa vie, ses œuvres
  - Henri Morice for La poésie de Sully-Prud’homme
- 1922:
  - Clara de Longworth-Chambrun Giovanni Florio
  - Henri Girard Un bourgeois dilettante à l’époque contemporaine, Émile Deschamps
  - Gonzague Truc Tibériade
  - Philippe Van Tieghem La poésie de la nuit et des tombeaux en Europe au XVIIIe siècle
  - Maurice Vaussard L’intelligence catholique dans l’Italie au XXe siècle
- 1923:
  - Jacques Arnavon La représentation de la Comédie classique. Notes sur l’interprétation de Molière
  - Alexandre Masseron Les énigmes de la Divine Comédie
  - Joseph Segond L'Imagination
  - Édouard Thamiry De l’influence et La méthode d’influence de Saint-François-de-Sales
- 1924:
  - Émile Dermenghem Joseph de Maistre mystique
  - René Galland Georges Meredith (1828-1878)
  - Jean Larat La tradition et l’exotisme dans l’œuvre de Charles Nodier
  - Maurice Legendre Portrait de l’Espagne
  - Charles Loiseau Politique romaine et sentiment français
  - Frederick Charles Roe Taine et l’Angleterre
- 1925:
  - Adolphe Coster Luis de Léon
  - Maurice de Fleury L’Angoisse humaine
  - Camille Looten for Shakespeare et la religion
  - Arthur Lytton Sells for Les sources françaises de Goldsmith
  - Paul Truffau for Raoul de Cambrai
- 1926:
  - Ernest de Ganay for Chantilly au XVIIIe siècle
  - Cornelis Kramer for André Chénier et la poésie parnassienne
  - Maurice Levaillant for Splendeurs et misères de M. de Chateaubriand
  - Émile Pons for Swift, les années de jeunesse and Le conte du tonneau
  - Albert Valentin for Giovanni Pascoli, poète lyrique
- 1927:
  - Geneviève Bianquis for La poésie autrichienne de Hofmannsthal à Rilke
  - Georges Connes for Étude sur la pensée de H. G. Wells
  - Clara de Longworth-Chambrun for Shakespeare, auteur, poète
  - A. Augustin-Thierry for La princesse Beljiojoso
- 1928:
  - Paul Berret for Victor Hugo
  - Robert Chantemesse for Le roman inconnu de la duchesse d’Abrantès
  - John Charpentier for Coleridge
  - Maurice Magendie for Du nouveau sur l’Astrée
  - Pierre Moreau for Chateaubriand, l’homme et la vie, le génie et les livres
  - Marcel Raymond for L’influence de Ronsard sur la poésie française
- 1929:
  - Fernand Desonay for Le rêve hellénique chez les poètes parnassiens
  - Robert d'Harcourt for La jeunesse de Schiller
  - Lucien Maury for L’imagination scandinave
  - James Sirven for Les années d’apprentissage de Descartes
- 1930:
  - Jules Chaix-Ruy for De Renan à Jacques Rivière
  - René Grousset for Sur les traces de Bouddha
  - Jules Legras for La littérature en Russie
- 1931:
  - Marguerite Aron for Un animateur de la jeunesse au XIIIe siècle. Bx Jourdain de Saxe
  - Charles Felgères for Scènes et tableaux de l’histoire d’Auvergne
  - Émilie Romieu for La Vie de George Eliot et La Vie des sœurs Brontë
- 1932:
  - Maurice Bardon for Don Quichotte en France au XVIIe et au XVIIIe siècle
  - Claire-Éliane Engel for La littérature alpestre
  - Pierre Lyautey for L’Empire colonial français
  - Jacques Meniaud for Les pionniers du Soudan
- 1933:
  - Henri Ghéon for Promenades avec Mozart
  - Agnès de La Gorce for Francis Thomson et les poètes catholiques d’Angleterre
  - Régis Jolivet for Saint Augustin et le néoplatonisme
  - Raymond Las Vergnas for W.-M. Thackeray
  - Maurice Magendie for Le roman français au XVIIe siècle
  - Henriette Psichari for Ernest Psichari, mon frère
- 1934:
  - Paul Dudon for Saint Ignace de Loyola
  - Jean Guitton for La philosophie de Newman
  - Pierre Humbert for Un amateur : Peiresc
  - Jean Lescoffier for Bjorson
- 1935:
  - R.P. François Charmot for L'Humanisme et l'Humain
  - André Fauconnet for Études sur l'Allemagne
  - Modeste Lioudvigovitch Hofmann and André Pierre for La vie de Tolstoï
  - Louis Jalabert for Syrie et Liban
  - René Lote for Histoire de la culture allemande
  - Pierre Séchaud for Victor de Laprade, l'homme, son œuvre poétique
- 1936:
  - Alexis Carrel for L'homme, cet inconnu
  - Robert d'Harcourt for Goethe et l’art de vivre
  - Paul Henry, S.J. for Plotin et l'Occident
  - Isabelle Rivière for Le bouquet de roses rouges
  - Véga for Henri Heine peint, par lui-même et par les autres
- 1937:
  - Jacques Arnavon for L’École des femmes, de Molière
  - Jacques de Broglie for Madame de Staël et sa cour au château de Chaumont
  - Léon-Basile Guerdan for Un ami oriental de Barrès, Tigrane Yergate
  - Robert Mattlé for Lamartine voyageur
  - Joannes Van der Lugt for L'action religieuse, de Ferdinand Brunetière
- 1938:
  - Jean Cathala for Portrait de l'Estonie
  - Yves Congar for Chrétiens désunis
  - René Dollot for L'Afghanistan
  - Lucienne Portier for Antonio Fogazzaro
  - Auguste Thomazi for Les flottes de l'or
  - Henri de Ziégler for Vie de l'Empereur Frédéric II de Hohenstaufen
- 1939:
  - Raymond Christoflour for Louis le Cardonel
  - Jean Wahl for Études Kierkegardiennes

=== From 1940 to 1988 ===
- 1940:
  - Marie Delcourt for Périclès
  - Alexandre Masseron for Pour comprendre la Divine Comédie
  - Anatole Rivoallan for Littérature irlandaise contemporaine
- 1941:
  - Albert Dauzat for Tableau de la langue française
- 1942:
  - Pierre-Henri Simon
- 1943:
  - Philippe Bertault for Balzac et la Religion
- 1944:
  - Joseph Desaymard for L'Auvergne dans les lettres contemporaines
- 1945:
  - Eugène David-Bernard for La conquête de Madagascar
- 1946:
  - Floris Delattre for La personnalité d’Auguste Angelier
  - Edmond Delucinge for Images littéraires de Savoie
  - Henri Morier for Le rythme du vers libre symboliste
  - Auguste Viatte for Victor Hugo et les illuminés de son temps
- 1947: Victor-Henry Debidour for Saveur des lettres
- 1948:
  - Clara de Longworth-Chambrun for Shakespeare retrouvé
  - Albert Lopez for Un poète et sa divine
  - Charles Mauron for L'homme triple
  - Ludovic O'Followell for La vie manquée de Félix Arvers
  - Maurice Ricord for Louis Bertrand l'Africain
  - André Trofimoff for Au jardin des mused françaises
- 1949: John Charpentier for Alexandre Dumas
- 1950:
  - Raphaël Barquissau for Les poètes créoles du XVIIIe siècle
  - Claire-Éliane Engel for Esquisses anglaises
- 1951:
  - Louis Chaigne for Vies et œuvres d'écrivains
  - André-Jean Festugière for L'enfant d'Agrigente, suivi de Le grec et la nature
- 1952:
  - Jacques-Henry Bornecque for Les années d’apprentissage d'Alphonse Daudet
  - Pierre Sage for Le "bon prêtre" dans la littérature française
- 1953: Jean Soulairol for Paul Valéry
- 1955: Louis-Édouard Tabary for Duranty
- 1956: Auguste Haury for L’Ironie et l’Humour chez Cicéron
- 1957:
  - Yves Le Hir for Esthétique et structure du vers français
  - Yves du Parc for Dans le sillage de Stendhal
- 1958: Georges Cattaui for T. S. Eliot
- 1959: René Jasinski for Vers le vrai Racine
- 1960:
  - Victor Del Litto for La vie intellectuelle de Stendhal
  - Renée Lelièvre for Le Théâtre dramatique italien en France 1855-1940
- 1961:
  - Aimée Alexandre for Le Mythe de Tolstoï
  - André Lagarde and Laurent Michard for Les grands auteurs français
- 1962: Simone Blavier-Paquot for La Fontaine, vues sur l’art du moraliste
- 1963: Armand Pierhal for l'ensemble de son œuvre
- 1964: Jean-Georges Ritz for Le poète Gérard Manley Hopkins 1844-1889
- 1965: Jean Mesnard for l'Édition des Œuvres complètes de Pascal
- 1966:
  - David Albert Griffiths for Jean Reynaud, encyclopédiste de l’Époque romantique
  - Pierre Menanteau for Images d’André Mage de Fiefmelin, poète baroque
- 1967: Jean Onimus for La Connaissance poétique
- 1968: Edmée de La Rochefoucauld for En lisant les cahiers de Paul Valéry
- 1969: Henry Bonnier for l'Édition des Œuvres complètes de Vauvenargues
- 1970: Dominique Janicaud for Une généalogie du spiritualisme français
- 1971: Philippe Sellier for Pascal et saint Augustin
- 1972: Elie Wiesel for Célébration hassidique
- 1973: Pierre Marchais for Glossaire de Psychiatrie
- 1974: François Châtelet for L’Histoire de la philosophie
- 1975:
  - Guillaume Guindey for Le drame de la pensée dialectique, Hegel, Marx, Sartre
  - Marie-Dominique Philippe for L’Être. Recherche d’une philosophie première
- 1976: René Démoris for Le roman à la première personne
- 1977: Mircea Elide for Histoire des croyances et des idées religieuses de l’âge de pierre aux mystères d’Eleusis
- 1978:
  - Paul Bénichou for Le temps des prophètes. Doctrine de l’âge romantique
  - Jean Lafond for La Rochefoucauld. Augustinisme et littérature

== Laureates of the Académie des Inscriptions et Belles-Lettres ==
=== Orientalism ===
- 1861: Hermann Zotenberg
- 1904:
  - William Marçais for Le Taqrîb de En-Nawawi, Le dialecte arabe parlé à Tlemcen et Les monuments arabes de Tlemcen.
  - Charles Fossey for Manuel d'Assyriologie
  - Antoine Cabaton for Nouvelles Recherches sur les Chams.
- 1907:
  - Edmond Doutté for Merrâkech
  - Adamantios Adamantiou for Chronique de Morée
  - Armand Guérinot for Bibliographie du Jaïnisme
  - Gaston Migeon for Manuel d'art musulman
  - Jean Touzard for Grammaire hébraïque
  - Henry de Castries for Sources inédites de l'histoire du Maroc
- 1910:
  - Hermine Harrleben for Correspondance de Champollion
  - Félix Lacôte for Essai sur Gunāḍhya et la "Bṛhatkathā"
  - François Martin for Lettres néo-babyloniennes
  - Antoine Cabaton for Catalogue sommaire des manuscrits sanscrits et pālis de la Bibliothèque nationale
  - Mr. Delaporte for La Chronographie syriaque d'Élie bâr Sinaya (Chronographia of Elijah of Nisibis)
- 1913:
  - Étienne Lunet de Lajonquière for Inventaire descriptif des monuments du Cambodge
  - Antoine Cabaton for Catalogue sommaire des manuscrits indiens, indo-chinois et malayopolynésiens de la Bibliothèque nationale
  - Léon Legrain for Le temps des rois d'Ur
  - Emmanuel Podechard for L'Ecclésiaste
  - Fulcran Vigouroux for Dictionnaire de la Bible
- 1916:
  - Edmond Fagnan for Mawerdi (Abou'l-Hasan ʿAli). Les Statuts gouvernementaux, ou Règles de droit public et administratif
  - François Nau for Les ménologes des évangéliaires coptes-arabes and Ammonas, successeur de saint Antoine.
- 1937:
  - Jean-Philippe Lauer for Fouilles à Saqqarah
  - G. Ort-Geuthner for Grammaire démotique du Papyrus magique de Londres et de Leyde
- 1940:
  - Roman Ghirshman for Fouilles de Sialk, près de Kashan
  - Armand Ruhlmann for Les Grottes préhistoriques d'"El Khenzira" (région de Mazagan) and Les Recherches de préhistoire dans l'extrême Sud marocain
- 1943:
  - Jean Sauvaget for Alep : essai sur le développement d'une grande ville syrienne des origines au milieu du XIXe siècle
  - Abbé Chaîne for Notions de langue égyptienne. Langue du Nouvel-Empire
  - Robert-C. Flavigny for Le Dessin de l'Asie occidentale ancienne
- 1946:
  - Jean Vercoutter for Les objets égyptiens et égyptisants du mobilier funéraire carthaginois
  - Robert de Langhe for Les textes de Ras Shamra-Ugarit et leurs rapports avec le milieu biblique de l'Ancien Testament
- 1949:
  - Marcel Simon for Verus Israël, les relations entre juifs et chrétiens dans l'empire romain (135-425)
  - Jean David-Weill for Le Djami, d'Ibn Wahb
- 1952:
  - Pierre Merlat for Répertoire des inscriptions et monuments figurés du culte de Jupiter Dolichenus
  - René Neuville for Le paléolithique et le mésolithique du désert de Judée
- 1958: René Brunel for Le Monachisme errant dans l'Islam, Sīdi Heddi et les Heddāwa
- 1961: Yvonne Rosengarten for Le Régime des offrandes dans la société sumérienne et Le concept sumérien de consommation dans la vie économique et religieuse
- 1964: René Labat for Manuel d’épigraphie akkadienne : signes, syllabaires, idéogrammes
- 1967 Toudic Fahd for La Divination arabe, études religieuses, sociologiques et folkloriques sur le milieu natif de l'Islam
- 1970: Maurice Birot for Tablettes économiques et administratives d'époque babylonienne ancienne
- 1973: Jean-Claude Goyon for Confirmation du pouvoir royal au nouvel an
- 1976: André Raymond for Artisans et commerçants au Caire au XVIIIe siècle
- 1979: Arion Roșu for Les conceptions psychologiques dans les textes médicaux indiens
- 1982: Centre de documentation et de recherche sur la civilisation khmère
- 1985: Francesca Bray for Science and civilisation in China (Volume 6)
- 1991: Nathalie Beaux for Le cabinet de curiosités de Thoutmosis III. Plantes et animaux du « Jardin botanique » de Karnak
- 1994: Joseph Mélèze-Modrzejewski for all of his work
- 1997: Audran Labrousse for L’architecture des pyramides à textes. I, Saqqara Nord
- 2000: Adnan Bounni, Jacques Lagarce and Élisabeth Lagarce for Ras Ibn Hani. I, Le palais nord du Bronze récent. Fouilles 1979-1995, synthèse préliminaire
- 2003: Bruno Dagens and Marie-Luce Barazer-Billoret for traduction du Rauravâgama : un traité de rituel et de doctrine shivaïtes
- 2006: Louis Le Quellec for Du Sahara au Nil. Peintures et gravures d’avant les pharaons
- 2009: Florence Jullien for Le monachisme en Perse. La réforme d’Abraham le Grand, père des moines de l’Orient
- 2010: Abdelhamid Fenina for Numismatique et histoire de la monnaie en Tunisie
- 2012: Aram Mardirossian for La collection canonique d’Antioche. Droit et hérésie à travers le premier recueil de législation ecclésiastique (IVe s.)
- 2015: Philippe Vallat for Épître sur l’intellect d’Abū Nasr al-Fārābī
- 2019: Anna Caiozzo for Le Roi glorieux. Les imaginaires de la royauté d’après les enluminures du Shāh Nāma de Firdawsī aux époques timouride et turkmène
- 2021: Géraud Poumarède for L’Empire de Venise et les Turcs, XVIe-XVIIe siècles

=== Classical Antiquity ===
- 1901: Alfred Foucher for his mémoire entitled Une page nouvelle dans l'histoire de l'art grec (E. Curtius)
- 1903:
  - Charles Lécrivain for his mémoire entitled In labore solatium
  - Léon Homo for his mémoire entitled Quid de Historia Augusta sentiendum
  - Mr. Colin for his mémoire entitled Furor est, si alienigenae homines, plus lingua et moribus et legibus quam maris terrarumque spatio discreti, etc., etc..
- 1905:
  - Gustave Glotz for La solidarité de la famille dans le droit criminel en Grèce
  - Auguste Audollent for Carthage romaine
- 1908:
  - Gustave Lefebvre for Fragments d’un manuscrit de Ménandre
  - Henri Bornecque for Les clausules métriques latines
  - Victor Chapot for La Frontière de l'Euphrate, de Pompée à la conquête arabe
  - Henri Legras for La Table latine d'Héraclée
  - Léon Robin for La Théorie platonicienne des idées et des nombres d'après Aristote
- 1911:
  - Philippe-Ernest Legrand for Daos, tableau de la Comédie grecque pendant la période dite nouvelle
  - Camille Sourdille for Hérodote et la religion de l'Égypte et La Durée et l'étendue du voyage d'Hérodote en Égypte
  - Charles Plésent for Le culex, étude sur l'alexandrinisme latin
  - Alfred Besançon for Les Adversaires de l'hellénisme à Rome pendant la période républicaine
- 1914:
  - Eugène de Faye for Gnostiques et gnosticisme
  - Waldemar Deonna for L'Archéologie
  - Jean Lesquier for Les Institutions militaires de l'Égypte
  - Raymond Billiard for La vigne dans l'Antiquité
- 1917:
  - Jean Maspero for Papyrus grecs d'époque byzantine
  - Pierre Gusman for L’Art décoratif de Rome de la fin de la République au IVe siècle
- 1923:
  - Robert Fawtier for Sainte Catherine de Sienne
  - Armand Delatte for Essai sur la politique pythagoricienne
  - Jules Marouzeau for L'ordre des mots dans la phrase latine
- 1911:
  - Philippe-Ernest Legrand for Daos, tableau de la Comédie grecque pendant la période dite nouvelle
  - Camille Sourdille for Hérodote et la religion de l'Égypte et La Durée et l'étendue du voyage d'Hérodote en Égypte
  - Charles Plésent for Le culex, étude sur l'alexandrinisme latin
  - Alfred Besançon for Les Adversaires de l'hellénisme à Rome pendant la période républicaine
- 1914:
  - Eugène de Faye for Gnostiques et gnosticisme
  - Waldemar Deonna for L'Archéologie
  - Jean Lesquier for Les Institutions militaires de l'Égypte
  - Raymond Billiard for La vigne dans l'Antiquité
- 1917:
  - Jean Maspero for Papyrus grecs d'époque byzantine
  - Pierre Gusman for L’Art décoratif de Rome de la fin de la République au IVe siècle
- 1923:
  - Robert Fawtier for Sainte Catherine de Sienne
  - Armand Delatte for Essai sur la politique pythagoricienne
  - Jules Marouzeau for L'ordre des mots dans la phrase latine
- 1938:
  - André-Jean Festugière for Contemplation et vie contemplative selon Platon
  - Paul Cloché for Démosthènes et la fin de la démocratie athénienne
- 1941:
  - Marcel Durry for his edition of Panégyrique de Trajan
  - Mr. Cordier for his studies on the epic vocabulary of the Æneid
  - Marius Soffray for his research into the syntax of saint John Chrysostome according to the Homélies sur les statues
- 1944:
  - André Loyen for Sidoine Apollinaire et l'esprit précieux en Gaule aux derniers jours de l'Empire
  - André Magdelaine for Essai sur les origines de la sponsio
- 1947:
  - William Seston for Dioclétien et la tétrarchie
  - Jacqueline Duchemin for L'Agôn dans la tragédie grecque
  - Robert Marichal for L'Occupation romaine de la Basse-Egypte, le statut des "auxilia"
  - Émile Szlechter for Le contrat de société en Babylonie, en Grèce et à Rome
- 1959:
  - Pierre Fabre for Saint Paulin de Nole et l'amitié chrétienne
  - Dr. R. Pépin for "Liber medicinalis" de Quintus Serenus (Serenus Sammonicus)
- 1953:
  - Paul Cloché for Thèbes de Béotie, des origines à la conquête romaine
  - Jean Irigoin for Histoire du texte de Pindare
- 1955:
  - André Parrot for Archéologie mésopotamienne. II, Technique et Problèmes
  - Maurice Mercier for Le feu grégeois
- 1956: Christian Courtois for Les Vandales et l'Afrique
- 1959:
  - Georges Vallet for Rhégion et Zancle
  - Henri Le Bonniec for Le culte de Cérès à Rome
- 1962: Hans-Georg Pflaum for Les carrières procuratoriennes équestres sous le haut-empire romain
- 1965: François Chamoux for La Civilisation grecque à l'époque archaïque et classique
- 1968: Marcel Le Glay for Saturne africain, Histoire et Monuments
- 1971: Michel Labrousse for Toulouse antique
- 1974: Goulven Madec for Saint Ambroise et la philosophie
- 1977: Madeleine Bonjour for Terre natale. études sur une composante affective du patriotisme romain
- 1980: Robert Amy and Pierre Gros for La maison Carrée de Nîmes
- 1983: Jean-Marie Dentzet for Le motif du banquet couché dans le Proche-Orient et le monde grec du VIIe au IVe siècle avant J.-C.
- 1986: Madeleine Jost for Sanctuaires et cultes d'Arcadie
- 1988: Marie-Ange Bonhême for Les Noms royaux dans l'Égypte de la troisième période intermédiaire
- 1989: André Tchernia for Le vin de l'Italie romaine : essai d'histoire économique d'après les amphores
- 1992: Alexandre Grandazzi for La fondation de Rome. Réflexion sur l’histoire
- 1995: René Ginouvès
- 1998: François de Callataÿ for L’histoire des guerres mithridatiques vues par les monnaies
- 2001: Galien for Exhortation à l’étude de la médecine, Art médical II. Édition et traduction par Véronique Boudon
- 2004: Bernard Holzmann for L’acropole d’Athènes
- 2007: Christophe Feyel for Les artisans dans les sanctuaires grecs aux époques classique et hellénistique à travers la documentation financière en Grèce
- 2013: André Tchernia for Les Romains et le commerce
- 2016: Hélène Dessales for Le Partage de l’eau. Fontaines et distribution hydraulique dans l’habitat urbain de l’Italie romaine
- 2020: Pierre Judet de La Combe for her work dedicated to Homer and her translation in Tout Homère of the Illiad.

=== Middle Age and Renaissance ===
- 1906:
  - Jules Gay for L'Italie méridionale et l'Empire byzantin depuis l'avènement de Basile Ier jusqu'à la prise de Bari par les Normands (867-1071)
  - Charles Samaran and Guillaume Mollat for La fiscalité pontificale en France au xive siècle (période d'Avignon et grand schisme d'Occident)
  - Pierre Champion for Guillaume de Flavy, capitaine de Compiègne
- 1909:
  - Albert Vogt for Basile Ier, empereur de Byzance, 867-886, and la civilisation byzantine à la fin du IXe siècle
  - Henri Quentin, for Les martyrologes historiques du Moyen Âge
  - Mr. Wartmann for Les vitraux suisses au musée du Louvre
  - Paul Perdrizet for La Vierge de Miséricorde
- 1912:
  - Ferdinand Chalandon for Jean II Comnène, 1118-1143, et Manuel I Comnène, 1143-1180
  - Frédégand Callaey for L'Idéalisme franciscain spirituel au XIVe siècle. Étude sur Ubertin de Casale
  - Jean Longnon for Chronique de Morée
  - Dom Antonio Staerk for Les manuscrits latins du Ve au XIIIe siècle conservés à la Bibliothèque impériale de Saint-Pétersbourg
- 1915:
  - Henri Hauvette for Boccace, étude biographique et littéraire
  - René de Brebisson for Les Rabodanges
- 1918:
  - André Blum for L'estampe satirique en France pendant les guerres de religion
  - Charles Guéry for Histoire de l'abbaye de Lyre
  - Arthur Långfors for Les incipit des poèmes français antérieurs au XVIe siècle
  - Eugène Parturier for Délie, object de plus haulte vertu, édition critique par Maurice Scève
- 1924: Edmond Faral for Les Arts poétiques du xiie et du xiiie siècles
- 1939:
  - Georges Gaillard Les Débuts de la sculpture romane espagnole
  - Louis-Fernand Flutre and K. sneyders for Li Fet des Romains : compilé ensemble de Saluste et de Suetoine et de Lucan : texte du XIIIe siècle
  - Charles de Tolnay for Le Maître de Flémalle et les frères Van Eyck
- 1942:
  - Suzanne Solente for Le Livre des fais et bonnes meurs du sage roy Charles V par Christine de Pisan
  - René Vielliard for Les origines de la Rome chrétienne
  - Pierre Daudet for L'Etablissement de la compétence de l'Eglise en matière de divorce et de consanguinité
- 1945 Raymonde Foreville for L'Église et la royauté en Angleterre sous Henri II Plantagenêt (1154-1189)
- 1990: Jean-Pierre Babelon for Les châteaux de France au siècle de la Renaissance
- 1993: Bernard Vincent for 1492 - « L’année terrible »
- 1996: Christian Trottmann for La vision béatifique. - Des disputes scolastiques à sa définition par Benoît XII
- 1999: Madeleine Lazard for Agrippa d’Aubigné
- 2002: Florence Vuilleumier-Laurens for La raison des figures symboliques à la Renaissance et à l’Âge classique
- 2005: Ursula Bähler for Gaston Paris et la philologie romane
- 2008: Martin Aurell for La légende du roi Arthur
- 2011: Hélène Millet for L’Église du Grand Schisme (1378-1417)
- 2014: André Bouvard and his collaborators for Heinrich Schickhardt, Inventarium, 1630-1632. L’inventaire des biens et des œuvres d’un architecte de la Renaissance.
- 2017: Thomas Tanase for Marco Polo

== Laureates of the Académie des sciences morales et politiques ==
- 1877 : Gabriel Compayré for Histoire critique des doctrines de l'éducation en France depuis le seizième siècle.
- 1999 : Jean-Claude Kaufmann for La femme seule et le prince charmant. Enquête sur la vie en solo, Paris (Nathan), 1999 (in the category Morality and sociology).
- 2001 : Cécile Janura for her doctoral thesis Le droit administratif de Marcel Waline. Essai sur la contribution d’un positiviste au droit administratif français (Université d’Artois, 1999). (in the category Legislation, public law and jurisprudence).
- 2003 : Olivier Midière for his work L’aigle, le bœuf et le e-business, 3 tomes, auto-édition, 2002 (in the categories Political Economy, statistics and finance).
- 2005 : Jean-Pierre Gutton for Dévots et société au XVIIe siècle. Construire le ciel sur la terre, Paris (Belin), 2004 (in the category History and Geography).
- 2007 : Frédéric Gros for États de violence. Essai sur la fin de la guerre, Paris (Gallimard), 2006 (in the general category).
- 2009 : Michel Le Guern for Nicolas Beauzée, grammairien philosophe, Paris (Honoré Champion), 2009 (in the category Philosophy).
- 2011 : Jacqueline Lalouette for Jours de fête. Jours fériés et fêtes légales dans la France contemporaine, Paris (Tallandier), 2010 (in the category Morality and sociology).
- 2013 : Soudabeh Marin for Ostad Elahi et la tradition. Droit, philosophie et mystique en Iran, et Ostad Elahi et la modernité. Droit, philosophie et magistrature en Iran, éditions Safran, Bruxelles, 2012.
- 2015 : Xavier Fontanet for Pourquoi pas nous ?, Paris (Fayard/Les Belles Lettres), 2014.

== Laureates of the Académie des Beaux-Arts ==
- 1883 : Alfred Armand for Les Médailleurs italiens des XVe et XVIe siècles.
- ...
- 1989 : Pierre et François Greffe for Traité des dessins et des modèles.
- 2001 : Hervé Lacombe for Georges Bizet : Naissance d'une identité créatrice, Fayard, 2000.
- 2007 : Andrei Nakov for Kazimir Malewicz, le peintre absolu, Thalia Édition (Paris, 2007).
- 2009 : Philippe Bouchet for Charles Lapicque, le dérangeur.
- 2011 : Christophe Looten for his work Dans la tête de Richard Wagner, archéologie d'un génie (Éditions Fayard).

== Laureates of the Académie des Sciences ==
- 1862:
  - Félix Teynard (Photography).
  - Mr. Miersch (Photography).
- 1888 : Sofya Kovalevskaya for her work on the study of a rigid body.
- 1896 : Jacques Hadamard for his work in Geodesics.
- 1929 : Henri Benard for his work on eddies in fluid dynamics.
- 1992 : Monique Pick.
