= De Ceremoniis =

Book on the courtly ceremony of the Byzantine Empire

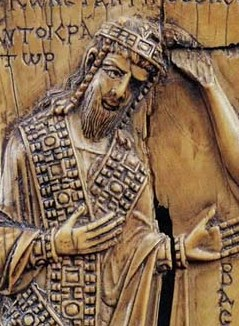
Constantine VII Porphyrogenitus in a 945 carved ivory.

The De Cerimoniis or De Ceremoniis (fully De cerimoniis aulae Byzantinae) is the conventional Latin name for a Greek book of ceremonial protocol at the court of the Byzantine emperors in Constantinople, written in the middle of the 10th century. Its Greek title is often cited as Ἔκθεσις τῆς βασιλείου τάξεως ("Explanation of the Order of the Palace"), taken from the work's preface, or Περὶ τῆς Βασιλείου Τάξεως ("On the Order of the Palace"). In non-specialist English sources, it tends to be called the Book of Ceremonies (variably spelt), a formula used by writers including David Talbot Rice and the modern English translation.

== History and sources ==
It was written or at least commissioned by Emperor Constantine VII (reigned 913-959), probably around 956-959. The compilation of Rep. I 17 (Leipzig, Universitätsbibliothek) was partially revised later under Nikephoros II (963-969), perhaps under the supervision of Basil Lekapenos, the imperial parakoimomenos, and it also contains earlier descriptions of the 6th century.

One of the book's appendices are the Three Treatises on Imperial Military Expeditions, a war manual written by Constantine VII for his son and successor, Romanos II.

== Composition ==
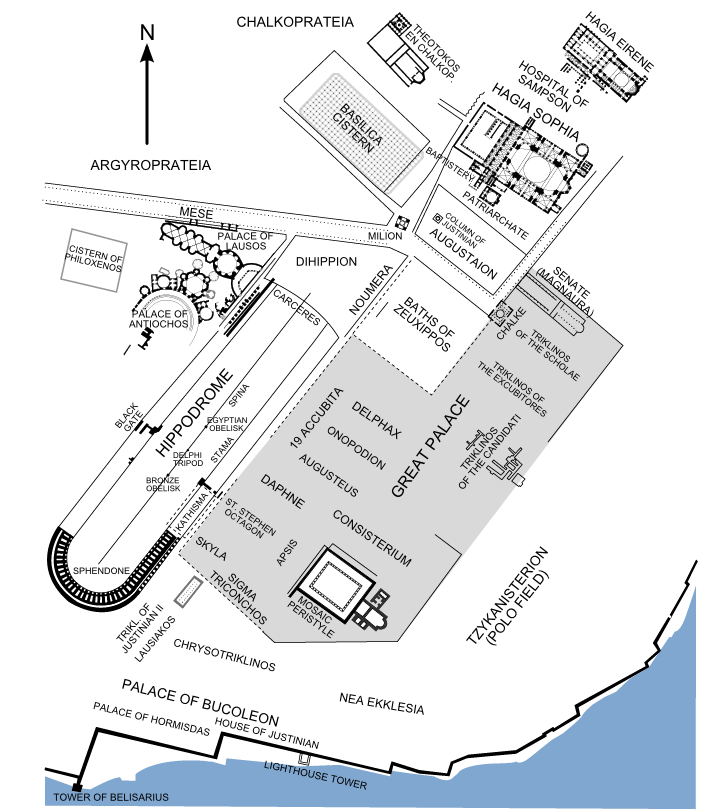
Map of the Great Palace situated between the Hippodrome and the Hagia Sophia. The structures of the Great Palace are shown in their approximate position as derived from literary sources. Surviving structures are in black.

In its incomplete form chapters 1-37 of book I describe processions and ceremonies on religious festivals (many lesser ones, but especially great feasts like the Elevation of the Cross, Christmas, Epiphany, Palm Sunday, Good Friday, Easter and Ascension Day and saint's days like St Demetrius, St Basil etc. often extended over many days), while chapters 38-83 describe secular ceremonies or rites of passage like coronations (38-40), weddings (39,41), births (42), funerals (60), or the celebration of war triumphs during feasts at the Hippodrome like Lupercalia (73).

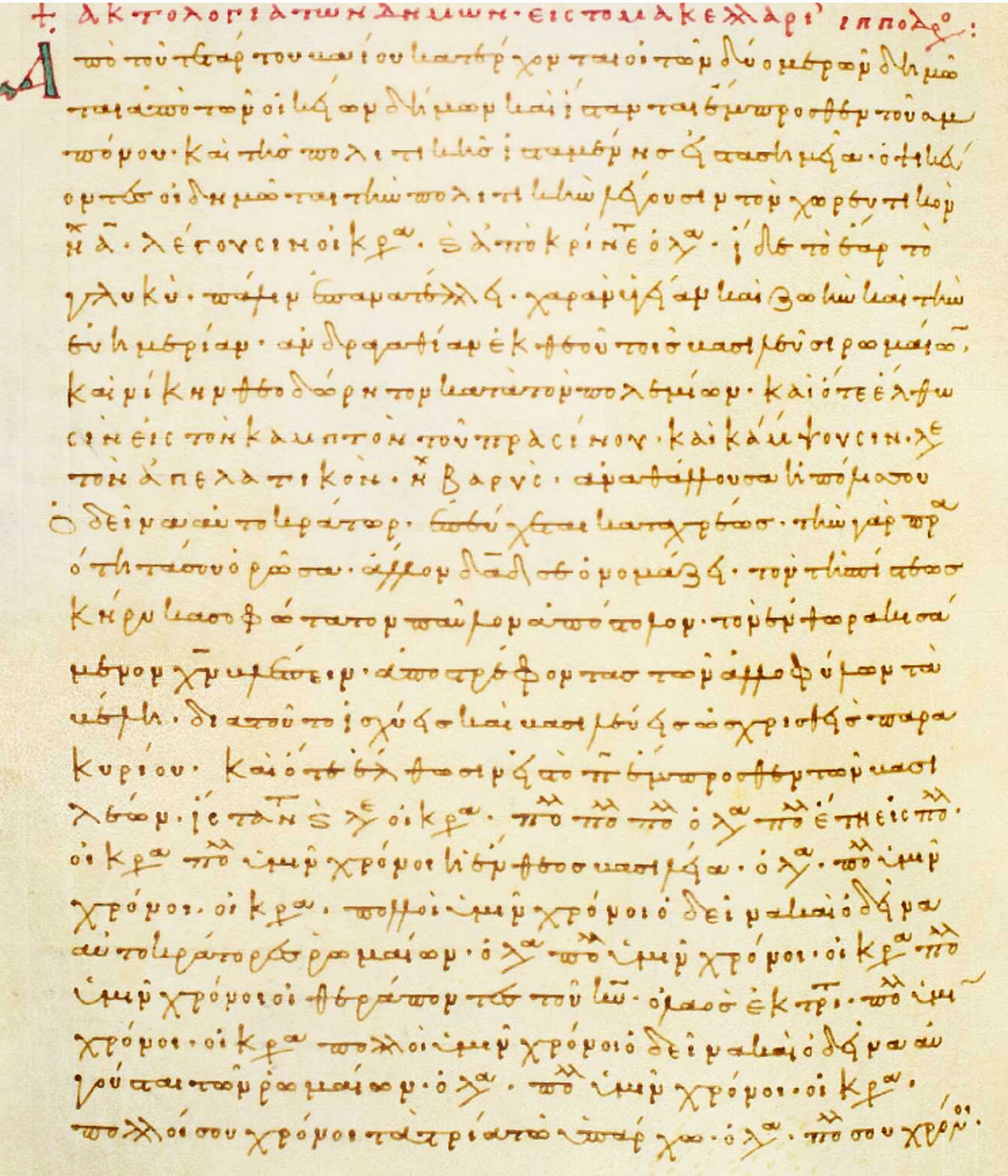
: Book of Ceremonies by Constantine VII Porphyrogennetos (book I, ch. 82): Leipzig, Universitätsbibliothek, Ms. Rep. I 17, f. 148r.

These protocols gave rules for imperial progresses to and from certain churches at Constantinople and the imperial palace, with fixed stations and rules for ritual actions and acclamations from specified participants (the text of acclamations and processional troparia or kontakia, but also heirmoi and stichera are mentioned), among them also ministers, senate members, leaders of the Blues and the Greens during the hippodrome's horse races who had an important role during court ceremonies. The following chapters (84-95) are taken from a 6th-century manual by Peter the Patrician. They rather describe administrative ceremonies like the appointment of certain functionaries (ch. 84,85), investitures of certain offices (86), the reception of ambassadors and the proclamation of the Western Emperor (87,88), the reception of Persian ambassadors (89,90), Anagorevseis of certain Emperors (91-96), the appointment of the senate's proedros (97). The "palace order" prescribes the conveyances required for movement (i.e. on foot, mounted, by boat), as well as the participants’ costumes and acclamations, some of which were debased Latin, which had not been an administrative language for more than three centuries.

The second book follows a very similar composition: (1) religious feasts and the description of palace buildings, (2) secular ceremonies and imperial ordonations, (3) imperial receptions and war festivities at the hippodrome, and later customs instituted by Constantine and his son Romanos.

== Editions and translations ==
In Latin

- Leichius, Ioannes Henricus; Reiskius, Ioannes Iacobus, eds. (1751). Constantini Porphyrogenneti Imperatoris Constantinopolitani libri duo De Cerimoniis Aulae Byzantinae. Vol. 1. Leipzig: Ioannes Fridericus Gleditsch.
- Leichius, Ioannes Henricus; Reiskius, Ioannes Iacobus, eds. (1754). Constantini Porphyrogenneti Imperatoris Constantinopolitani libri duo De Cerimoniis Aulae Byzantinae. Vol. 2. Leipzig: Ioannes Fridericus Gleditsch.
- Reiske, Johann Jakob; Leich, Johannes Heinrich, eds. (1829). Constantini Porphyrogeniti Imperatoris De Cerimoniis Aulae Byzantinae libri duo graece et latine e recensione Io. Iac. Reiskii cum eiusdem commentariis integris. Corpus Scriptorum Historiae Byzantinae. Vol. 1. Bonn: Weber.
- Reiske, Johann Jakob; Leich, Johannes Heinrich, eds. (1830). Constantini Porphyrogeniti Imperatoris De Cerimoniis Aulae Byzantinae libri duo graece et latine e recensione Io. Iac. Reiskii cum eiusdem commentariis integris. Corpus Scriptorum Historiae Byzantinae. Vol. 2. Bonn: Weber.

In English

- Konstantinos Porphyrogennetos: The book of ceremonies in 2 volumes. Byzantina Australiensia. Translated by Ann Moffatt and Maxeme Tall. Canberra: Australian Association for Byzantine Studies. 2012. ISBN 978-1876503420.
- Moffatt, Ann; Tall, Maxeme, eds. (2017) [2012]. Constantine Porphyrogennetos: The Book of Ceremonies. Leiden-Boston: Brill. ISBN 9789004344921.

In French

- Vogt, Albert, ed. (1935). Constantin VII Porphyrogénète: Le livre des cérémonies. Tome I. Livre I. – Chapitres 1-46 (37). Texte établi et traduit. Paris: Société d'édition Les Belles Lettres.
- Vogt, Albert, ed. (1935). Constantin VII Porphyrogénète: Le livre des cérémonies. Commentaire (Livre I. – Chapitres 1-46 (37)). Paris: Société d'édition Les Belles Lettres.
- Vogt, Albert, ed. (1939). Constantin VII Porphyrogénète: Le livre des cérémonies. Tome II. Livre I. – Chapitres 47 (38)-92 (83). Texte établi et traduit. Paris: Société d'édition Les Belles Lettres.
- Vogt, Albert, ed. (1940). Constantin VII Porphyrogénète: Le livre des cérémonies. Commentaire (Livre I. – Chapitres 47 (38)-92 (83)). Paris: Société d'édition Les Belles Lettres.
- Vogt, Albert, ed. (1967). Constantin VII Porphyrogénète: Le livre des cérémonies. Commentaires par Albert Vogt (2 vols.). Paris: Les Belles Lettres.
- Dagron, Gilbert; Flusin, Bernard, eds. (2020). Constantin VII Porphyrogénète: Le livre des cérémonies (5 vols.). Corpus Fontium Historiae Byzantinae. Paris: Association des Amis du Centre d’Histoire et Civilisation de Byzance. ISBN 978-2-916716-70-1.

== See also ==
- De Administrando Imperio

== Sources ==
- "Leipzig, Universitätsbibliothek, Rep. I 17, ff.21v-265v". Book of ceremonies Κωνσταντίνου τοῦ φιλοχρίστου καὶ ἐν αὐτῶν αἰωνίων βασιλεῖ βασιλέως ὑιοῦ Λέοντος τοῦ σοφωτάτου καὶ ἀειμνήστου βασιλεῦ συντάγμα τι καὶ βασιλείου σπουδῆς ὄντως ἄξιον ποίημα (late 10th century).
