= Mesnil-Martinsart =

French commune

- Commune
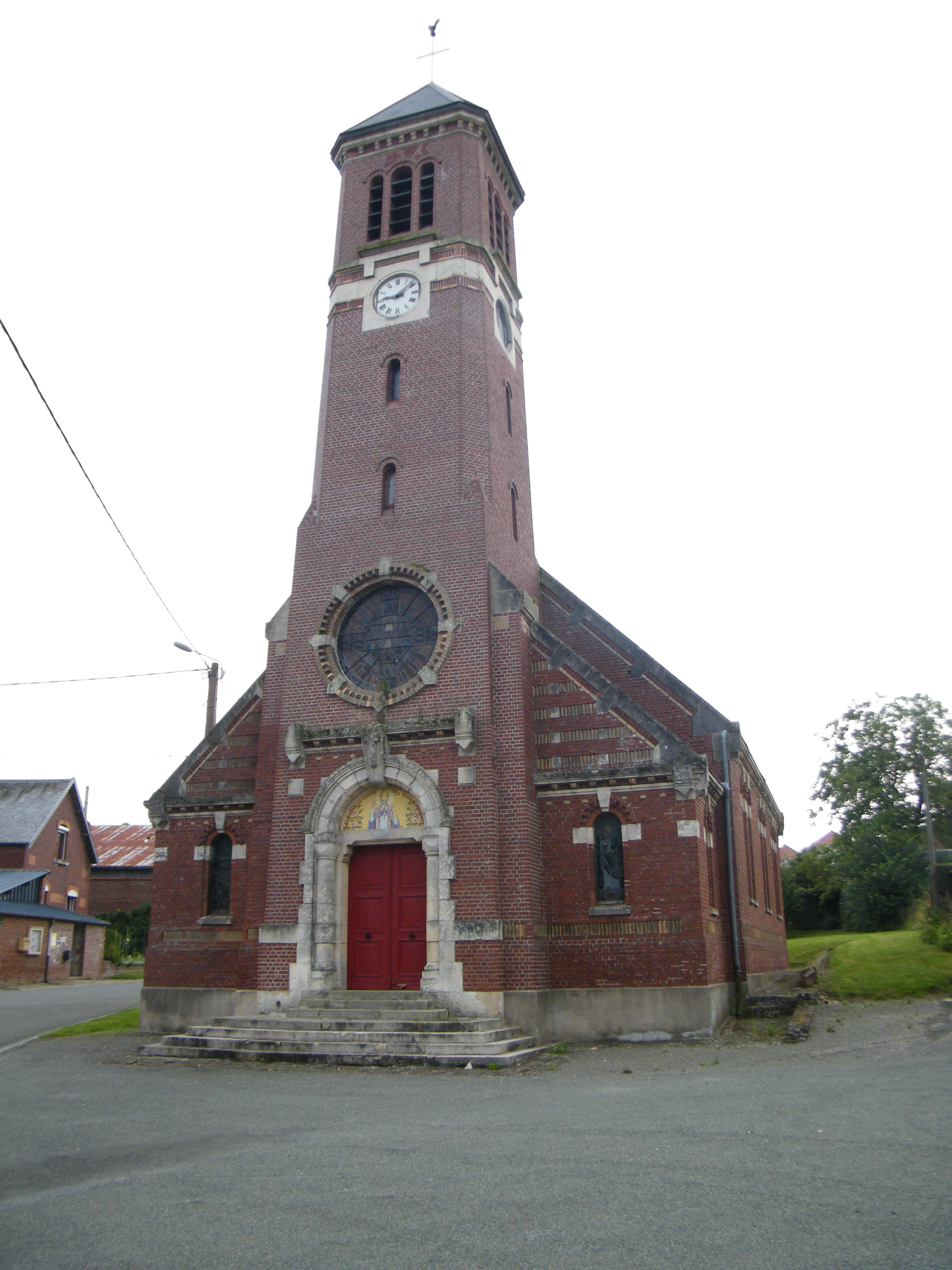
- The church in Mesnil-Martinsart
- Location of Mesnil-Martinsart
- Location within France Location within Hauts-de-France
- Coordinates: 50°03′16″N 2°38′57″E
- Country: France
- Region: Hauts-de-France
- Department: Somme
- Arrondissement: Péronne
- Canton: Albert
- Intercommunality: Pays du Coquelicot

Government
  - Mayor (2020–2026): Roger Roussel
- Area^{1}: 8.76 km^{2} (3.38 sq mi)
- Elevation: 128 m (420 ft)
- Highest elevation: 144 m (472 ft)
- Lowest elevation: 62 m (203 ft)
- Population (2023): 237
  - Density: 27.1/km^{2} (70.1/sq mi)
- Time zone: UTC+01:00 (CET)
  - Summer (DST): UTC+02:00 (CEST)
- INSEE/Postal code: 80540 /80300
- ^{1} French Land Register data, which excludes lakes, ponds, glaciers > 1 km^{2} (0.386 sq mi or 247 acres) and river estuaries.

Mesnil-Martinsart (French pronunciation: [menil maʁtɛ̃saʁ]) is a commune in the Somme département in Hauts-de-France in northern France.

== Geography ==
The commune is situated on the D174 road, some 22 miles (35 km) northeast of Amiens.

== Population ==
Historical population
Year	Pop.	±% p.a.
1968	231	—
1975	211	−1.29%
1982	197	−0.98%
1990	240	+2.50%
1999	233	−0.33%
2007	224	−0.49%
2012	246	+1.89%
2017	238	−0.66%
2023	237	−0.07%
Source: INSEE

== Personalities ==
- Louis-Fernand Flutre (1892-1978), an academic from the area, published two works on the village in 1955: Mesnil-Martinsart (Somme) Essai d'histoire locale and Le Parler picard de Mesnil-Martinsart (Somme) Phonétique, morphologie, syntaxe, vocabulaire.

== See also ==
- Communes of the Somme department
