= Éleuthère Mascart =

French scientist

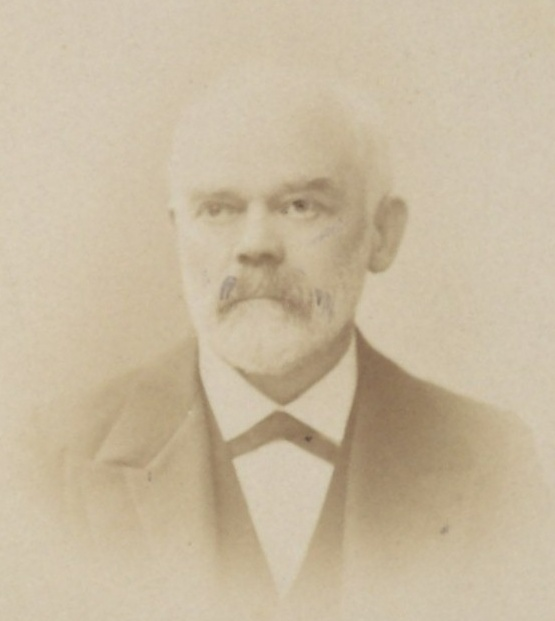
- Mascart in 1908
- Born: Éleuthère Élie Nicolas Mascart; February 20, 1837; Quarouble, France
- Died: August 24, 1908 (aged 71); Paris, France
- Education: École normale supérieure
- Awards: Prix Bordin (1866)
- Scientific career
- Institutions: Collège de France
- Thesis: Recherches sur le spectre solaire ultra-violet (1864)
- Doctoral students: Henri Bénard

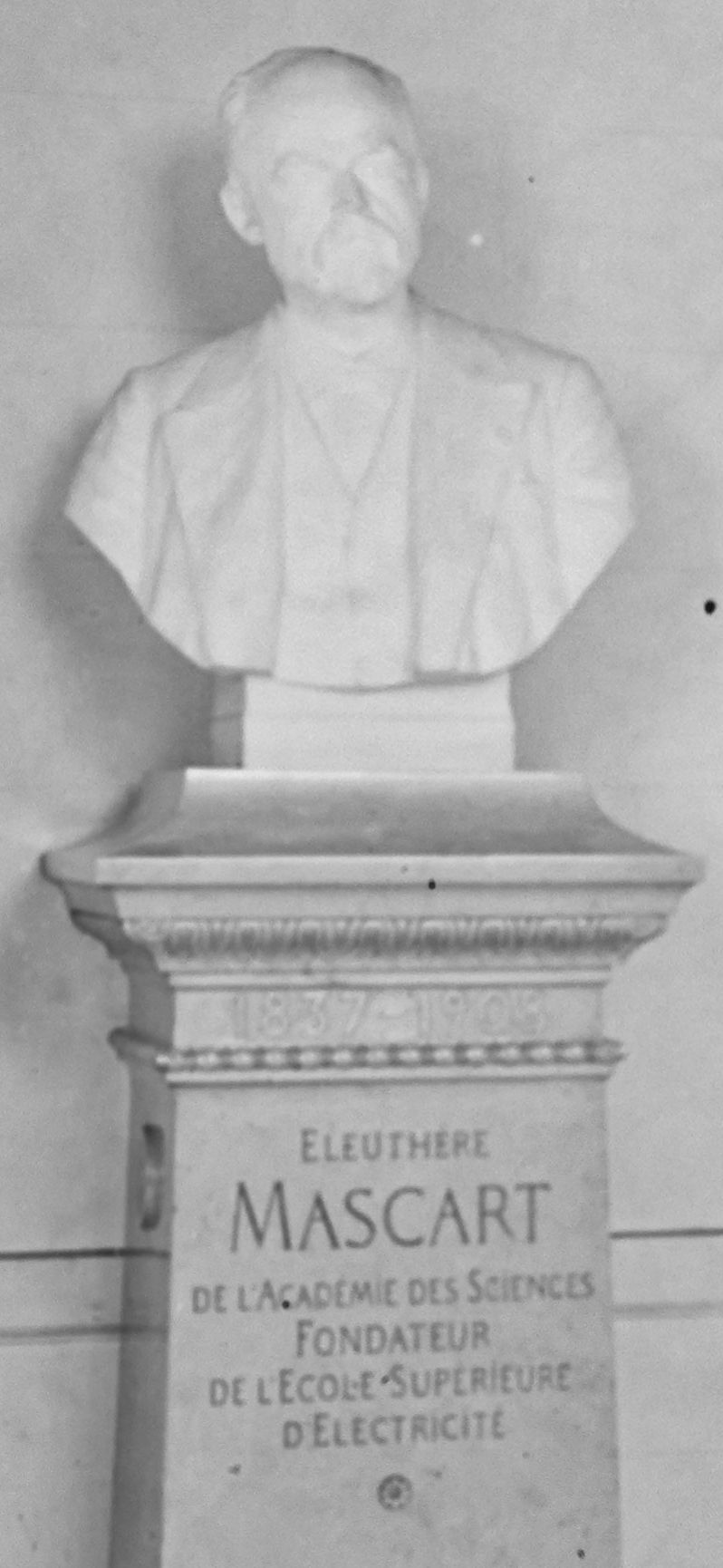
Bust of Éleuthère Mascart

Éleuthère Élie Nicolas Mascart (20 February 1837 – 24 August 1908) was a French physicist. His research focused in optics, electricity, magnetism, and meteorology.

== Life ==
Mascart was born in Quarouble, Nord. Starting in 1858, he attended the École normale supérieure (rue d'Ulm), earning his agrégé-préparateur three years later. He acquired his doctoral degree in science in 1864. After serving at various posts in secondary education, in 1868 he moved to the Collège de France to become Henri Victor Regnault's assistant. Mascart was appointed to succeed Régnault as the tenured Régnault chair in 1872, which he held until his death. In 1878 he also became the first director of the Bureau Central Météorologique.

He won the Prix Bordin of the Académie Française in 1866 and the Grand prix of the Académie des sciences in 1874. He was elected as a member of the American Philosophical Society in 1890.

He was elected Perpetual Member (1884), Secretary, and in 1904 President, of the Académie des Sciences, and in 1892, Foreign Member of the British Royal Society. In the same year, 1892, he was elected as an honorary member of the Manchester Literary and Philosophical Society, Mascart was elected vice president of the British Institution of Electrical Engineers in 1900, the first non-Briton to hold the post. He was also a grand officier of the Légion d'Honneur. Mascart founded Supélec in 1894.

Mascart's graduate student Henri Bénard carried out groundbreaking experiments in thermal convection, as part of his dissertation research, in Mascart's laboratory. Bénard's doctoral thesis was defended in 1901.

Mascart died in Paris at the age of 71. Obituaries were published in the Journal de Physique théorique et appliquée and in Nature. Mascart's son-in-law Marcel Brillouin and his grandson Léon Brillouin were also noted scientists.

Cape Mascart is named for him.

== Works ==
- E. Mascart, Recherches sur le spectre solaire ultra-violet et sur la détermination des longueurs d'onde, Thunot, Paris, 1864.
- E. Mascart, Éléments de Mécanique, Paris, 1866, 9th ed. in 1910.
- E. Mascart (1876). Traité d'électricité statique (in French). Vol. 1. Paris: Masson.
  - Traité d'électricité statique (in French). Vol. 2. Paris: Masson. 1876.
- E. Mascart and J. Joubert, A Treatise on Electricity and Magnetism, Translated by E. Atkinson, 2 volumes, T. De La Rue, London, 1883–1888.
- E. Mascart, Notice sur les travaux scientifiques de M. Éleuthère Mascart, Gauthier-Villars, Paris, 1884.
- E. Mascart, The Age of Electricity, Report of the Board of Regents of the Smithsonian Institution, pp. 153–172, 1894.
- E. Mascart, Traité d'Optique, 3 volumes, Gauthier-Villars, Paris, 1889–1893.
- E. Mascart (1896). Leçons sur l'éléctricité et le magnetisme (in French). Vol. 1. Paris: Masson.
  - Leçons sur l'éléctricité et le magnetisme (in French). Vol. 2. Paris: Masson. 1897.
- E. Mascart, Introduction à la physique expérimentale, 1888.
- E. Mascart, Traité de Magnétisme Terrestre, Paris, 1900.

== Bibliography ==
- P. Janet, La vie et les oeuvres d'Eleuthère Mascart, Revue générales des sciences pures et appliquées, vol. 20, pp. 574–593, 1909.
- P. Langevin, Eleuthère Mascart par Paul Langevin, 1909.
- R.H. Stuewer, Mascart, Éleuthère Élie Nicolas, Dictionary of Scientific Biography, Charles Scribner's Sons, New York, vol. 9, pp. 154–156, 1981.
- Electricians International Society, Travaux du Laboratoire central d'électricité, tome I, 1884–1905.
- Girolamo Ramunni and Michel Savio, Cent ans d'histoire de l'École Supérieure d'Electricité, 1894–1994, 1995.

== See also ==
- Fizeau experiment
