= Alice Sauvrezis =

French/Breton composer and concert organiser (1866–1946)

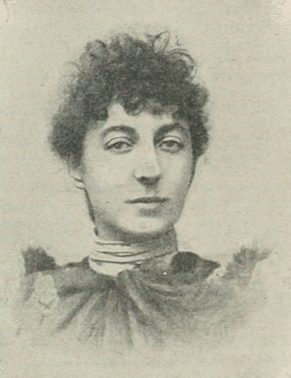
- Sauvrezis in 1901
- Born: 4 April 1866; Nantes, Pays de la Loire, France
- Died: 12 April 1946 (aged 80); Paris, France
- Occupations: Pianist; composer; choral conductor; concert organiser
- Years active: 1890s–1930s
- Organizations: Société Artistique et Littéraire de l'Ouest; Association des Compositeurs Bretons
- Style: Classical; chamber; Celtic

Alice Marie Marguerite Sauvrezis (4 April 1866 – 12 April 1946) was a French pianist, composer, choral conductor and concert organiser. As an active member of a group of Breton composers in Paris, and as president of the Société Artistique et Littéraire de l'Ouest, she promoted Celtic music and culture in France.

== Life and music ==
Little is known about Alice Sauvrezis's life. She was born in the Breton city of Nantes, where she worked as a piano teacher. She studied first with César Franck and later with Ernest Guiraud and Paul Vidal. She joined the Paris-based Société Artistique et Littéraire de l'Ouest in 1891 and became its president in 1920. The society organised concerts of "Celtic" music (contemporary "classical" music in a Celticist style) and poetry readings in so-called "Soirées celtiques" at Sorbonne university that included the creative output of Breton, Norman, and Irish composers, writers and artists. During 1913–1914, she was also the only female member of the short-lived Association des Compositeurs Bretons.

Her published music consists mainly of songs as well as piano and chamber music; there exist also a limited number of choral and orchestral compositions. As a moral supporter to wartime France, she edited two collections of French soldier songs: Chants de soldats (1525–1915) (Paris, 1915) and Autres chants de soldats (1200–1916) (Paris, 1916).

Some composers dedicated works to her, including piano music by Marguerite Balutet (Impromptu, Op. 15, No. 22; 1886) and Paul Dedieu-Péters (Porte close, Op. 58; 1897).

Sauvrezis died in Paris aged 80.

== Selected compositions ==
The following are her published works only.

=== Orchestral music ===
- Fresque marine (1912), published in version for piano 4-hands (Paris: M. Sénart, B. Roudanez et Cie.)
- La Chanson des soirs (1923), for piano and brass band (Paris: M. Sénart): 1. Soirs agrestes; 2. Soirs somptueux; 3. Soirs lugubres; 4. Dernier soir.

=== Incidental music ===
- Une Scène de l'enfance de Beethoven, "scène mimée", including choirs and dances (Paris: E. Fromont, 1906)
- Le Chant des pauvres, play by Gérard Detraux in 2 acts, based on Breton legends (Paris: M. Sénart, 1913)

=== Vocal and choral music, except songs ===
- La Ronde enfantine, for children's choir, words: Louis Ratisbonne (Paris: J. Naus et Romain, 1890)
- Nuitamment, for two sopranos, baritone and piano, words: Stephan Bordèse (Paris: Paris : Hachette & Cie., 1898)
- Les Vanneuses, for women’s choir with piano ad lib., words: Auguste Brizeux (Paris: U.T. du Wast, 1899)
- Epigramme funéraire, for soloist, choir and piano, words: [unknown] (Paris, 1907); also version for two singers and harp (Paris: Hachette, 1907)
- Hymne orphique, for soprano, baritone, female choir, two flutes, clarinet, four harps, words: Charles Leconte de Lisle (Paris: M. Sénart, B. Roudanez et Cie., 1910); also version for voice and piano
- Excuse à la marraine, for soloist, choir and piano, "texte d'un poilu" (Paris: M. Sénart, 1920)

=== Songs, for voice and piano ===
- Souvenir, words: Paul Vibert (Paris: J. Maus, 1887)
- Clair de lune. La Forêt blanche, words: Henri Chantavoine (Paris: Hachette, 1889)
- Tristesse. La Forêt noire, words: H. Chantavoine (Paris: Hachette, 1889)
- 10 Chants de la comédie enfantine, words: Louis Ratisbonne (Paris: Lemoine et fils, 1891)
- Toujours, words: Jules Lemaître (Paris: Locatelli, 1893)
- Chanson de mer, words: Sully Prudhomme (Paris: Pons, 1896)
- La Fileuse, words: Herminie Delavault (Paris: Enoch, 1898)
- La Flûte, words: José-Maria de Heredia (Paris: A. Durand et fils, 1899)
- Sône, words: Anatole Le Braz (Paris: U.T. du Wast, 1899)
- Chansons écossaises: 1. Jane; 2. Nell, words: Charles Leconte de Lisle (Paris: E. Fromont, 1900)
- Le Sommeil de Canope, words: Albert Samain (Paris: E. Fromont, 1900)
- Sonnets forestiers, words: H. Chantavoine (Paris: Hachette, 1900): 1. Le Matin (Prélude); 2. La Forêt rouge (Soleil couchant); 3. La Forêt blanche (Clair de lune); 4. La Forêt noire (Tristesses).
- Axilis au ruisseau, words: Albert Romain (Paris: E. Fromont, 1902)
- La Conque, words: J.-M. de Heredia (Paris: E. Fromont, 1902)
- Ton Souvenir, words: A. Samain (Paris: E. Fromont, 1903)
- Fleurs de feu, words: J.-M. de Heredia (Paris: E. Fromont, 1906)
- Le Repos en Egypte, words: A. Samain (Paris: E. Fromont, 1906)
- Le Batelier, words: H. Delavault (Paris: Hachette, 1907)
- Chanson violette, words: A. Samain (Paris: Hachette, 1907)
- Heures claires, words: Émile Verhaeren (Paris: M. Sénart, B. Roudanez et Cie., 1911): 1. Chaque heure, où je pense à ta bonté; 2. Je dédie à tes pleurs; 3. Que tes yeux clairs; 4. Vivons dans notre amour; 5. S'il arrive jamais.
- Prélude de la chanson d'Eve, words: Charles van Lerberghe (Paris: M. Sénart, B. Roudanez et Cie., 1911)
- Autre chanson, words: Henri de Régnier (Paris: M. Sénart, 1913)
- Ballade de la Belle au bois dormant, words: Maurice Pézard (Paris: M. Sénart, 1913)
- Chants de soldats (1525–1915): Chansons populaires, chants militaires, hymnes nationaux, sonneries (Paris & Nancy: Berger-Levrault, 1915)
- Autres chants de soldats (1200–1916): Chansons populaires, chansons de route, chants historiques et militaires (Paris: Berger-Levrault, 1916)
- Prière avant la Bataille, words: Henri Dussauze (Paris: M. Sénart, 1916)
- Soldats de France. Chant dédié aux combattants, words: Capitaine Nicolas (Paris: M. Sénart, 1916)
- Noël d'Alsace, words: Émile Hinzelin (Paris: M. Sénart, 1917)
- Le Départ, words: H. de Régnier (Paris: M. Sénart, 1919)
- L'Heure, words: H. de Régnier (Paris: M. Sénart, 1919)
- Deux Illustrations musicales, words: A. Samain (Paris: E. Froment, c.1920): 1. Nyza chante; 2. Hermione et les bergers.
- Deux Poèmes de Victor-Émile Michelet (Paris: M. Sénart, 1920): 1. Roses mortes; 2. L'Heure de ta beauté.
- Harmonie du soir, words: Charles Baudelaire (Paris: M. Sénart, 1921)
- Calme des jardins, words: Louis Arnould-Gremilly (Paris: M. Sénart, 1921)
- Neiges sur la montagne, words: L. Arnould-Grémilly, with violin and cello ad lib. (Paris: M. Sénart, 1922)
- Heures d'été, words: A. Samain (Paris: E. Fromont, 1924)
- Veillée, words: Albert Mockel (Paris: M. Sénart, 1925)
- L'Angoisse des steppes, words: Constantin Balmont (Paris: M. Sénart, 1927)
- Rythme perdu, words: L. Arnould-Gremilly (Paris: M. Sénart, 1927)
- Le Repos en Égypte, words: A. Samain (Paris: M. Sénart, 1928)
- Le Vitrail, words: Alice Sauvrezis (Paris: M. Sénart, 1928)
- En vain d'un voile épais, words: V.-É. Michelet (Paris: M. Sénart, 1939)

=== Chamber music ===
- Duo, for two pianos (Paris: A. Durand et fils, 1899)
- Sonate en Ré mineur, for violin and piano (Paris: Hachette, 1902)
- Dialogues, for two pianos (Paris: E. Leduc, P. Bertrand et Cie., 1913)
- Chant sans paroles, for violin and piano (Paris: M. Sénart, 1917)
- Poème, for cello and piano (Paris: M. Sénart, 1920)

=== Piano music ===
- Chant sans paroles (Paris: Locatelli, 1898)
- Deux Pièces caractéristiques (Paris: H. Lemoine, 1899)
- [3] Pièces pour piano (Paris: U.T. du Wast, 1899)
- La Goutte d'eau (Paris: E. Demets, 1904)
- En automne (Paris: M. Sénart, B. Roudanez et Cie., 1910)
- Étude héroïque, for the left hand only (Paris: M. Sénart, B. Roudanez et Cie., 1912)
- Cloches de Pâques (Paris: M. Sénart, 1913; reprinted 1934)
- France! (Paris: M. Sénart, 1915)
- Gestes d'enfants (Paris: M. Sénart, 1925)
- Notations d'été (Paris: M. Sénart, 1929)
- À la volée (Paris: M. Sénart, 1934)

=== Organ music ===
- Choral pour l'Offertoire (Paris: M. Sénart, 1914)
