= Pierre-Michel Duffieux =

French physicist

- Born: 1891; Near Bordeaux, France
- Died: 3 June 1976
- Education: École Normale Supérieure; Aix-Marseille University
- Known for: Fourier Optics
- Scientific career
- Fields: Physics
- Workplaces: Université de Rennes; Université de Besançon

Pierre-Michel Duffieux (1891–1976) was a French physicist, known as the founder of Fourier optics.

== Life and career ==
Duffieux became interested in physics by listening to the lectures of Pierre Duhem in high school in Bordeaux. In 1912 he entered the École Normale Supérieure. During the first world war he was involved in military work under the supervision of Henri Bénard, applying Fourier methods to measuring the coefficients of thermal conductivity. This work resulted in his first scientific publication.

In 1920 Duffieux became an assistant of Charles Fabry in Marseille, earning his doctorate in 1925 with a thesis on band spectroscopy. Afterward he worked in interference spectroscopy, moving to Rennes in 1927. During World War II Duffieux discovered Fourier optics, presenting his ideas at a meeting of the French Society of Physics in Paris in 1941, and publishing several papers. He completed a monograph on the subject in 1943–1944, which was privately published after the war in 1946. The work gained little attention outside France until Born and Wolf called attention to it in their text, Principles of Optics (1959). A second edition of Duffieux's book was published in 1970 by Masson (Paris) and an English translation appeared in 1983. After the war, Duffieux moved to Besançon and became the chair of optics at the university.

Duffieux was also interested in philosophy, music, and the meaning and interpretation of quantum theory.

== Bibliography ==
- Max Born and Emil Wolf (1999). Principles of Optics: Electromagnetic Theory of Propagation, Interference and Diffraction of Light, seventh edition (Cambridge University Press), p. 543. ISBN 978-0-521-64222-4
- P.-M. Duffieux (1983). The Fourier Transform and its Applications to Optics (Wiley, New York).
- Peter Hawkes and Noël Bonnet (1997). A symposium in honour of Pierre-Michel Duffieux. Microscopy, Microanalysis, Microstructures vol. 8, no. 1, pp. ix - xiv.
- André Maréchal (1976). Pierre-Michel Duffieux. Physics Today, vol. 29, No. 11 (November), p. 85.
