= Auguste Lacaussade =

French poet, translator and librarian (1815–1897)

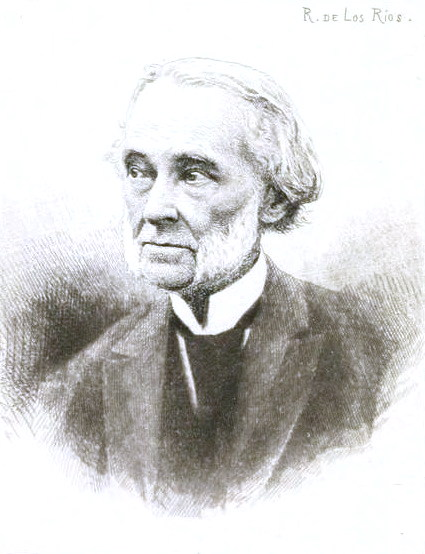
- Born: 8 February 1815; Saint-Denis (France)
- Died: 31 July 1897; Paris
- Resting place: Montparnasse Cemetery
- Other name: Poète-pays
- Occupations: Poet, translator, librarian, writer
- Awards: prize Maillé Latour Landry (1850); Prix Bordin (1862); Chevalier of the Legion of Honour (1860)

Signature
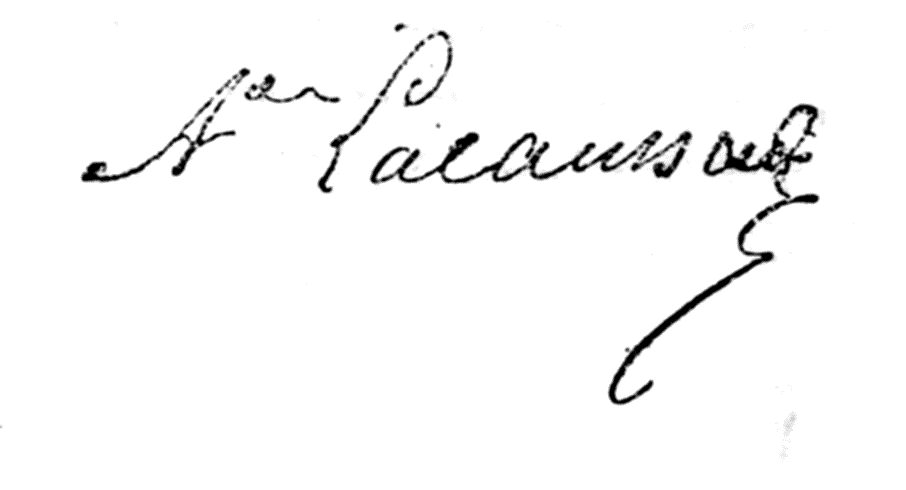

Auguste Lacaussade (8 February 1815 – 31 July 1897) was a French poet who also worked as a translator and a librarian.

Auguste Lacaussade is a French mulatto born in Saint-Denis (Bourbon Island). Some of his works are on the theme of Maroons, such as Les Salaziennes (1839) or Le Lac des Goyaviers et le Piton d’Anchaine in Poèmes et Paysages (1897).

== Selected works ==
=== Poems ===
- Les Salaziennes (1839)
- Poèmes et paysages (1852)
- Les Épaves (1861)

=== Songs ===
- Mon Etoile (1842) (feat. D. José Jesús Pérez, composer)
- La Voix de mes jours passés (1844) (feat. Peppe Gambogi, composer)
