= Prix du livre incorrect =

French literary award

The Prix du livre incorrect is a French literary prize. It was created in 2006 by Jean Sévillia.

== Lauréats ==
- 2007 : Éric de Montgolfier for Le Devoir de déplaire (Michel Lafon)
- 2008 : Jean Clair for Malaise dans les musées (Flammarion)
- 2009 : Patrick Rambaud for Deuxième chronique du règne de Nicolas I^{er} (Grasset)
- 2010 : Éric Zemmour for Mélancolie française (Fayard)
- 2011 : Christian Millau for Journal impoli (Le Rocher)
- 2012 :
  - Pascal Bruckner for Le Fanatisme de l'apocalypse. Sauver la Terre, punir l'Homme (Grasset-Fasquelle)
  - Christopher Caldwell for Une révolution sous nos yeux : comment l'islam va transformer la France et l'Europe (Toucan)
- 2013 : Éric Naulleau for Pourquoi tant d’E.N. ? (Jean-Claude Gawsewitch)
- 2014 : Lorànt Deutsch for Hexagone (Michel Lafon)
- 2015 :
  - Gabriel Matzneff for Mais la musique soudain s'est tue : Journal 2009-2013 (Gallimard)
  - Natacha Polony for Ce pays qu’on abat. Chroniques 2009-2014 (Plon)
- 2016 : Marc Endeweld for Enquête sur un ministre qui dérange, L'ambigu Monsieur Macron (Flammarion)
- 2017 : Camille Pascal for Ainsi Dieu choisit la France (Presses de la Renaissance)
- 2018 :
  - Frédéric Gros for Désobéir (Albin-Michel/Flammarion)
  - Maurizio Serra for D'Annunzio le magnifique (Grasset)
- 2019 : Rémi Soulié for Racination (Pierre-Guillaume de Roux)
