= Henri Bénard =

French physicist (1874–1939)

Henri Claude Bénard
- Born: 25 October 1874; Lieurey, Eure, Normandy, France
- Died: 29 March 1939 (aged 64); Neuilly-sur-Seine, France
- Education: École normale supérieure Collège de France
- Known for: Rayleigh–Bénard convection Bénard-Marangoni convection Kármán vortex street
- Spouse: Clémentine Olga Malhèvre
- Awards: Chevalier de la Légion d'honneur à titre militaire (1919); Bordin Prize (1929); Poncelet Prize (1939)
- Scientific career
- Fields: Physics
- Workplaces: University of Lyon; University of Bordeaux; University of Paris
- Thesis: Les tourbillons cellulaires dans une nappe liquide propageant de la chaleur par convection, en régime permanent (1901)
- Doctoral advisor: Éleuthère Mascart; Marcel Brillouin

Henri Claude Bénard (25 October 1874 – 29 March 1939) was a French physicist, best known for his research on convection in liquids that now carries his name, Bénard convection. In addition, the historical surveys of both Tokaty and von Kármán both acknowledge that Bénard studied the vortex shedding phenomenon later named the Kármán vortex street, prior to von Karman's own contributions. Bénard specialized in experimental fluid dynamics, and the use of optical methods to study it. He was a faculty member at the universities at Lyon, Bordeaux, and finally the Sorbonne in Paris.

Bénard defended his PhD thesis at the Collège de France on 15 March 1901 entitled "Les Tourbillons cellulaires dans une nappe liquide propageant de la chaleur par convection en régime permanent".

Bénard was elected President of the French Society of Physics (SFP) in 1929, following the presidency of Louis Lumière. He was succeeded as President the next year by his friend and former teacher, Jean Perrin. In 1929 Bénard received the Bordin Prize for his work on vortices from the French Academy of Sciences. After his death in 1939, his widow received the Poncelet Prize on his behalf, also from the French Academy of Sciences.

A research center of the ERCOFTAC in Lyon is named after him.

== Life and career ==
=== Early and student years ===
Henri Bénard was the only son of a small investor, Felix A. Bénard (1851–1884), and his wife Hélène M. Mangeant (1837–1901). He attended elementary school in Lisieux and Caen and high school at the Lycée Louis-le-Grand. In 1894, Bénard was one of 17 students selected from 307 candidates to attend the École normale supérieure (ENS) in the sciences section. His classmates there included Henri Lebesgue and Paul Langevin, and one of his teachers was Jean Perrin. Bénard received his teaching degree in physics in 1897, and then began working as an assistant to Éleuthère Mascart and Marcel Brillouin at the Collège de France in Paris. At this time, Bénard joined the French Society of Physics (SFP).

Bénard's initial scientific efforts related to the optical rotation of sugars, resulting in papers co-authored with Mascart and ENS chemistry student L.-J. Simon. The first of these was an experimental measurement of the angle of rotation of polarized light by pure sugar in solution, to determine its concentration for use in saccharimetry, undertaken at the request of the Commission on Sugars and Alcohols, of the Ministry of Finances. Bénard's results were adopted as the legal values in France by the Ministry of Finances. Meanwhile, Marcel Brillouin was teaching a course on the viscosity of liquids and gases, and asked Bénard to repeat Poiseuille's experiments on water flow rates in capillary tubes. However, Brillouin also wanted experiments done with mercury instead of water. Bénard's results (undertaken in the first 6 months of 1899) were summarized in 1907 in Brillouin's textbook based on the course. Brillouin also supervised the translation into French of Boltzmann's textbook on kinetic theory of gases, by Bénard and Alexandre Gallotti.

The subject of Bénard's dissertation was cellular thermal convection, inspired by accidental observations made by Adrien Guebhard of convection in a bath of abandoned film developer. Working in Mascart's lab, Bénard carried out the first controlled, systematic scientific experiments on convection in a shallow layer of fluid heated from below. He found that the convective motions organized themselves in semi-regular, semi-permanent cellular patterns. Upflows occurred in the centers of the cells and downflows occurred at their peripheries. There was also a slight depression of the upper free surface of the fluid at each cell center, leading Bénard to speculate about the role of surface tension. He also measured the aspect ratio of the cells and discovered that there was a critical temperature below which no convection occurs. Unfortunately, he attributed this to the solidification of the fluid he was using (spermaceti, a whale oil that is solid at room temperature). Ironically, Bénard would much later become a skeptic about the very concept of the critical temperature difference, although he discovered it. In 1900–1901, Bénard presented the results of this work (and the associated optical methods) in four different journals, the Comptes Rendus Hebdomadaires des Séances de l'Académie des Sciences, the Revue Générale des Sciences Pures et Appliquées et Bulletin de l'Association Française pour l'Avancement des Sciences, the Journal de Physique Théorique et Appliquée, and the Annales de Chimie et de Physique. He also presented his findings to at least two scientific meetings, as well as in the first thesis of his dissertation. (The second part of his thesis dealt with optical rotation in sugars.) This work laid the foundation for the study of Rayleigh–Bénard convection, the buoyancy-driven flow of fluid confined between horizontal conducting surfaces, with the higher temperature at the bottom; and Bénard–Marangoni convection, the surface-tension-driven flow of a fluid with an upper free surface and a heated, conducting surface at the bottom. These problems have continued to occupy scientists beginning with Lord Rayleigh and continuing into the 21st century.

Bénard spent two months as a high-school teacher in Cherbourg (Oct.-Nov. 1900) before acquiring a pension from the Thiers Foundation (Nov. 1900–April 1902). He defended his dissertation on 15 March 1901, at the age of 26, and was awarded the Docteur ès Sciences physiques, mention très honorable. His dissertation committee consisted of Gabriel Lippmann, Edmond Bouty, and Émile Duclaux. In September 1901, Bénard attended the conference of the British Association at Glasgow, where he observed a number of notable British physicists, such as Lord Kelvin, Silvanus P. Thompson, Andrew Gray, and Joseph Larmor. Unfortunately, an "excess of modesty" (Bénard's own words) prevented him from showing the results of his work to Lord Kelvin in Glasgow, as well as at the earlier Paris conference. Kelvin's late brother, James Thomson, had studied thermal convection qualitatively prior to Bénard's work.

On 23 December 1901 Bénard married Clémentine Olga Malhèvre, a few months after his mother's death; they had no children.

=== Lyon ===
Bénard was appointed a senior lecturer at the university at Lyon (1902), in charge of introductory courses. Despite his teaching load, in 1904 he began experimental studies of vortex shedding behind an obstacle; the work was carried out in a cellar. In 1906 he began using a cinema camera to record these phenomena. Initial publications of this work occurred in 1908, but the films would not be fully utilized until the 1920s. Nonetheless, Benard's experimental work in Lyon was the beginning of his contribution to the study of what we now call the Kármán vortex street.

=== Bordeaux ===
In 1910, Bénard moved to Bordeaux, where he was now a professor and chair of general physics. One of his colleagues there was Pierre Duhem. Bénard continued to study vortex shedding, analyzing the Lyon films to measure the wavelength and frequency of vortex shedding as other parameters are varied, such as the flow speed and the geometry of the obstacle. He also made films of thermal convection.

Also in 1910, Bénard began collaborating with Camille Dauzère (1869–1944), who became a key collaborator in Bénard's fluid dynamics research. Dauzère studied the problems of thermal convection and solidification, prompting Bénard himself to revisit the topic and even speculate, based on Dauzère's work, that the lunar craters may have been formed by thermal convection and solidification. Henri Deslandres had also noticed the analogy with lunar craters, as well as pointing out (correctly, as it turns out) a further analogy with solar granulation.

In 1913–1914, Bénard and Dauzère made a series of eight films, on convection and solidification in an evaporating fluid, which were produced with the aid of a large firm, Gaumont. Also in these years, the two scientists received subsidies from the Bonaparte Fund, administered by the French Academy of Science, for their research.

Dauzère completed his Ph.D. in 1919 in Paris, after spending a year doing solidification experiments under Charles Fabre in Toulouse. Dauzère then became director of the Pic du Midi observatory in 1920 until his retirement in 1937.

In 1919, Bénard was elected to the Council of the University of Bordeaux, and he began publishing the results of his wartime work (see next section).

=== World War I ===
The First World War provided a change of emphasis for Bénard's research. He was placed in charge of a study of the question of transporting frozen meat in refrigerated wagons (1914–1916), and subsequently joined the Commission Supérieure des Inventions de Guerre in Paris, and the Physics Section of the Direction des Inventions (both appointments between 1917–1919). He later became the Chief of the Physics Section. His conclusions from the frozen meat project were adopted, and around a million tons of frozen meat were transported in refrigerated wagons, during a four-year period, to various French army fronts. Bénard was assisted in this work by an ENS student, Pierre-Michel Duffieux, who later (during World War II) founded the field of Fourier optics.

Bénard's own war work on optics involved various systems of lenses, with applications to wide-angle photography; the use of polarized light for the improvement of the visibility of distant objects; and the conditions of the visibility of submarine wakes. Applications included optical devices for military use, such as for detecting submarine and ship wakes.

In 1916, Bénard met the meteorologist Paul Idrac in Paris. Idrac would later publish experimental observations of convection rolls (consistent with the predictions of Lord Rayleigh).

During the war, Bénard held the rank of Sergeant of territorial infantry, attached to the Supply Corps. He was awarded the Chevalier de la Légion d'honneur (military title) on 14 July 1919 and a similar award (but with civil title) on 10 November 1920. Unfortunately the second award, honoring his invention of polarized binoculars adopted by the French Navy, was annulled due to 'double employment' the next month.

=== Paris ===
In 1922, Bénard moved to the University of Paris, Sorbonne, as senior lecturer in physics. In 1926 he became a full professor, and was teaching introductory physics. In the 1920s he continued his work with the vortex streets, determining an experimental law for the frequency in terms of the velocity of the flow, the viscosity of the fluid, and the size of the obstacle; he claimed that his law contradicted the theoretical results of von Kármán. In this period, a priority dispute over the discovery of vortex shedding erupted between Bénard and von Kármán, detailed at length by Wesfreid. Meanwhile, Bénard again revisited his work on thermal convection, claiming agreement between his results and the theory of Lord Rayleigh.

Bénard led conferences in 1927–1928 at the Sorbonne regarding alternating eddies and cellular eddies. In 1928 Bénard was elected President of the French Society of Physics (SFP), and in that position interacted with a number of important contemporaries such as Louis de Broglie, Paul Langevin, Dimitri Riabouchinsky, and Pierre Weiss. Benard had been an SFP member since 1897. One of Bénard's principal concerns at the SFP was to increase the membership of the society, in particular among engineers and technicians. By the end of his term, he had succeeded in raising the membership from 1222 to 1260: "It is a slow growth, but finally there is growth".

In 1929, the French Aeronautics Ministry established an Institute of Fluid Mechanics at the Sorbonne (headed by Henri Villat), and appointed Bénard to be the director of its Fluid Mechanics Laboratory and to the Chair of Experimental Fluid Mechanics. He gave the inaugural address for the laboratory in November. In December, Bénard received the Bordin Prize from the French Academy of Science, in honor of his work on eddies. The list of the prize committee members makes interesting reading: Appell, Painlevé, Lecornu, Hadamard, Goursat, Lebesgue, and Picard.

In 1935, Bénard was appointed head of the section on atmospheric convection of the Commission on Atmospheric Turbulence, organized by the French Air Ministry, and headed by Phillipe Wehrlé. Meanwhile, he had already been joined by a number of students: Duson Avsec, Michel Luntz, C. Woronetz, H. Journaud, Victor Volkovisky, Paul Schwarz, V. Romanovsky, and G. Sartory among others. These students studied thermal convection in various regimes, including electroconvection, surface tension-driven convection, etc. Bénard himself returned to the question of convection on the solar photosphere (solar granulation) in 1935.

In 1937, Bénard was placed in charge of teaching at the École Supérieure de l'Aéronautique. He and his student Avsec published a major review article of their work on thermal convection in 1938. Finally, on 29 March 1939, at the age of 64, "an unexpected death interrupted his scientific activity". The French Academy of Science awarded its Poncelet Prize that year to his widow, in honor of her late husband. During the second world war, the building lent to Bénard for use as his laboratory was taken over by the German army in 1940.

== Assessments ==
Bénard's early experimental work on thermal convection has been discussed by Chandrasekhar, Berg, Acrivos, and Boudart, and at great length by Koschmieder. Bénard's later work on convection in shear flows is included in the comprehensive review by R. E. Kelly. Bénard's work on vortex shedding is discussed briefly by Provansal.

The astrophysicist Edward A. Spiegel has stated his view that

Bénard and his students soon appreciated that his first experimental results were atypical of ordinary fluids. They went on to attempt 'to define and to measure in a horizontal liquid layer heated from below, the convection currents that prevail, considered as near as possible to their state of greatest stability.' The problem so formulated is at the center of modern convective pattern research, and the work of Bénard's students anticipated some important modern discoveries and methods. Surprisingly, their early grasp of the basic issues is generally overlooked in the current literature.

Pierre Chevenard remembers Bénard as "a delightful colleague" and "always happy to render service to young physicists who come to solicit his advice." Bénard was also said to be modest to a fault, as he "disliked publishing and never presented a synthesis of his views."

== See also ==
- Scientific phenomena named after people
