= Alexis Chassang =

French linguist and translator (1827–1888)

Alexis Chassang (French pronunciation: [alɛksi ʃasɑ̃]; 2 April 1827 in Bourg-la-Reine – 8 March 1888 in Bourg-la-Reine) was a French linguist and translator.

In 1849, he received his agrégation in letters, and in 1852, his doctorate. Afterwards, he served as a professor of rhetoric at lycées in Lille and Bourges. From 1862 to 1871, he was a professor of Greek languages and literature at the École Normale Supérieure in Paris.

From 1873 to 1888, he held the post of Inspector General of Secondary Education. He was co-founder of the Association pour l'encouragement des études grecques (Association for the Promotion of Hellenic Studies), serving as its president in 1887.

== Biography ==
Admitted first to the École normale supérieure (Paris) in 1846, first in the agrégation de lettres in 1849, then Doctor of Letters in 1852, he was a professor of rhetoric at the high schools of Lille and Bourges, then in charge of the complementary course in French language and literature at the École normale supérieure, where he was subsequently a professor of Greek language and literature from 1862 to 1871. He was appointed Inspector General of Secondary Education in 1873.

Alexis Chassang has published academic works, including a Greek-French dictionary, as well as numerous articles in various journals. He translated Philostratus Life of Apollonius of Tyana and published a History of the Novel and its Relationship to History in Greek and Latin Antiquity in 1862. He also continued his uncle Marie-Nicolas Bouillet's Universal Dictionnaire Bouillet.

In 1869, he received the Prix Bordin from the Académie Française for Le Spiritualisme et l’Idéal dans la poésie des Grecs (Spiritualism and Idealism in Greek Poetry) and in 1880, the Archon-Despérouses Prize for Remarques sur la langue française, par Vaugelas (Remarks on the French Language, by Vaugelas).

== Published works ==
- Des Essais dramatiques imités de l'antiquité au XIVe et au XVe siècle, 1852 (dissertation).
- Choix de narrations tirées des auteurs latins, 1854.
- Histoire du roman et de ses rapports avec l'histoire dans l'antiquité grecque et latine, 1862.
- Apollonius de Tyane : sa vie, ses voyages, ses prodiges, 1862 (translation of Philostratus).
- Le Spiritualisme et l'idéal dans l'art et la poésie des Grecs, 1868.
- Nouveau dictionnaire grec-francais, 1872.
- Nouvelle grammaire grecque... d'après les principes de la grammaire comparée, 1872.
- Nouvelle grammaire française, 1876.
- Grammaire grecque, d'après la méthode comparative et historique : cours supérieur, 1888.
- New etymological French grammar giving for the first time the history of the French syntax.

== Bibliography ==
- Pierre Larousse, Grand Dictionnaire universel du XIXe siècle, vol. III, 1867.
