= Camille Pascal =

French writer and civil servant

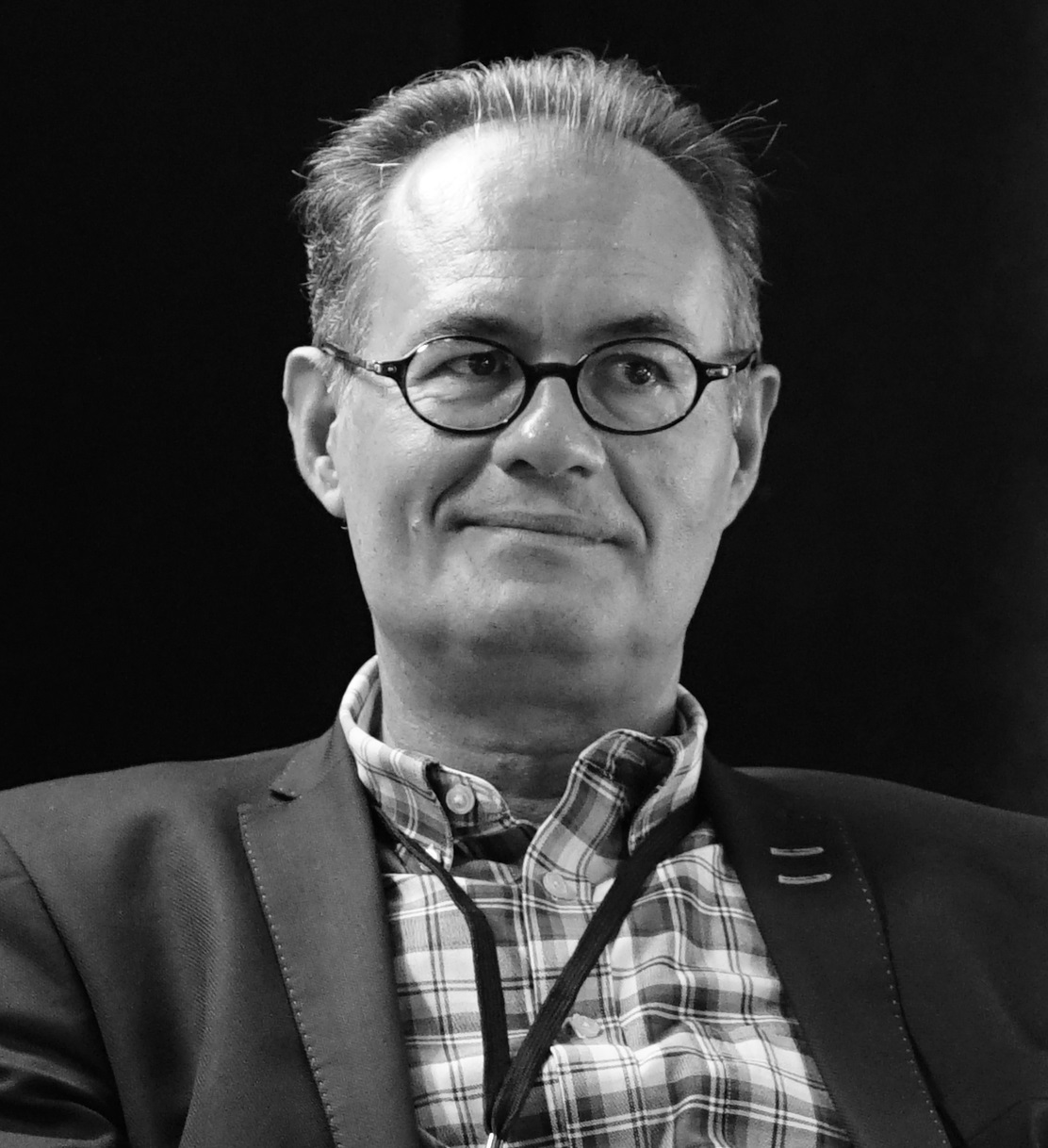
Camille Pascal in 2018

Camille Pascal is a French writer and senior civil servant.

After having held the position of secretary general and director of communication of the France Télévisions group, he was adviser to President Nicolas Sarkozy between 2011 and 2012. He is the winner of the 2018 Grand Prix du roman de l'Académie française.

He has served on the Council of State since 2012.

== Awards and honors ==
=== Decorations ===
- Chevalier de l'ordre national du Mérite (2007)
- Chevalier de l'ordre des Palmes académiques (2003)
- Officier de l'ordre des Arts et des Lettres (2019)
- Commandeur de l'ordre de Saint-Grégoire-le-Grand (2008)
- Chevalier grand-officier catégorie de mérite, de l'ordre sacré et militaire constantinien de Saint-Georges (2016)
- Officier de l'ordre pro Merito Melitensi (2012)

=== Prizes ===
- Prix du Cercle des amis de Montesquieu, for Le Goût du Roi (2008).
- Prix du livre incorrect, for Ainsi dieu choisit la France (2017).
- Grand prix du roman de l'Académie française, for L'Été des quatre rois (2018).
- Since 2003, Camille Pascal has been an associate member of the Académie des sciences morales, des lettres et des arts de Versailles et d'Île-de-France.

== Publications ==
=== Collective work ===
For Foreseen, International Observatory of Sociological Trends:

- 1998 : L’Alternative des valeurs féminines, éd. Denoël, 188 p. ISBN 2-207-24733-3
- 1998 : De l’homo sapiens à l’homme interactif, éd. Denoël, 258 p. ISBN 2-207-24732-5
- 1999 : Les Nouveaux Horizons de la consommation, éd. Plon, 266 p. ISBN 2-259-19051-0
- 1999 : Du corps machine à la santé harmonique, éd. Plon, 271 p. ISBN 2-259-19176-2
- 1999 : La Soif d’émotion, éd. Plon, 271 p. ISBN 2-259-19257-2
- 2000 : Les Screenagers, avoir 20 ans en l’an 2000, éd. Plon, 248 p. ISBN 2-259-19304-8

=== Essays ===
- 2006 : Le Goût du roi : Louis XV et Marie-Louise O'Murphy, éd. Perrin, 327 p. ISBN 2-262-01704-2
- 2012 : Scènes de la vie quotidienne a l’Élysée, éd. Plon ISBN 978-2-259-21925-9
- 2015 : Les Derniers Mondains, éd. Plon ISBN 978-2-259-22780-3
- 2016 : Ainsi, Dieu choisit la France, Presses de la Renaissance, 352 p.

=== Novels ===
- 2018 : L'Été des quatre rois, éd. Plon ISBN 978-2-259-24843-3
- 2020 : La chambre des dupes, éd. Plon ISBN 978-2-259-27678-8
- 2022 : L'Air était tout en feu, Robert Laffont, 352 p. ISBN 9782221263709
