= Dictionnaire Bouillet =

1842 book by Marie-Nicolas Bouillet and Alexis Chassang

Universal Dictionary of History and Geography
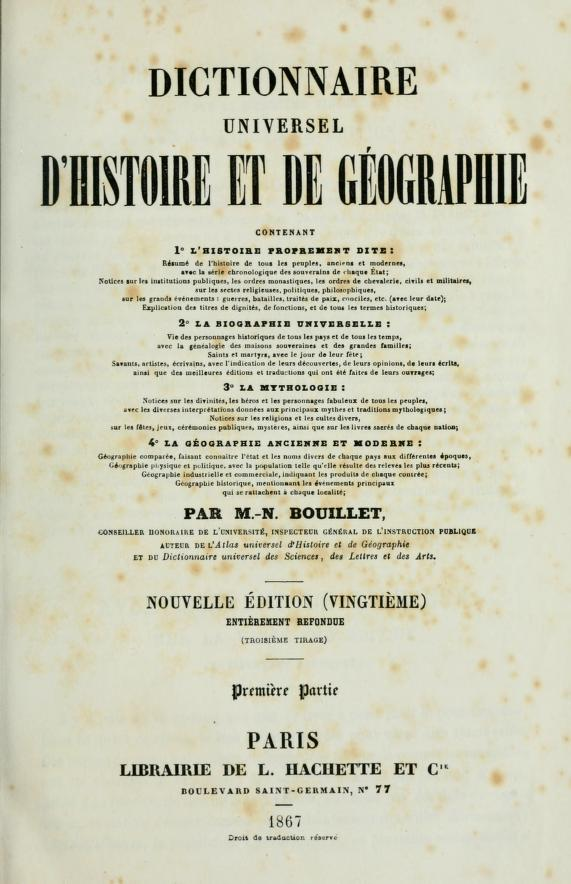
- Author: Marie-Nicolas Bouillet; Alexis Chassang
- Original title: Dictionnaire universel d'histoire et de géographie
- Language: French
- Subject: History, geography, biography
- Published: 1842
- Publication place: France
- Media type: Print
- Original text: Dictionnaire universel d'histoire et de géographie at French Wikisource

Dictionnaire Bouillet (French pronunciation: [diksjɔnɛːʁ bujɛ]) is the informal title of the Dictionnaire universel d'histoire et de géographie ("Universal Dictionary of History and Geography"), a French reference work in the public domain. The first edition was published in 1842; the 34th and final edition was published in 1914. The original authors were Marie-Nicolas Bouillet (d. 1865) and Alexis Chassang (1827–78).

== Neutrality of later editions ==
Editions after 1852 were amended, probably clandestinely and by the typographers rather than the authors, to make certain articles less offensive to Christian sensibilities. For example, for Cardinal Ximenes, the original Il était fanatique et cruel ("He was fanatical and cruel") was changed to read Il était sévère, mais juste ("He was tough but fair"). References to sales of religious indulgences were deleted entirely.

The neutrality of editions after 1842 is therefore open to question when the work touches on Christian themes.
