= Frédéric Gros =

French philosopher (born 1965)

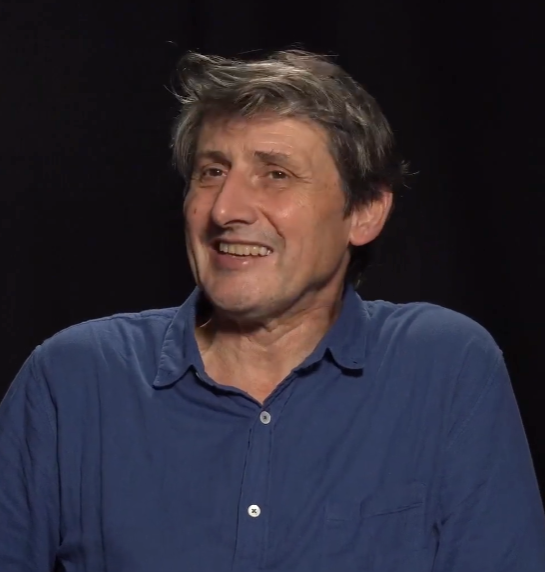
- In a 2024 interview
- Born: 30 November 1965 (age 60); Saint-Cyr-l'École, France
- Occupation: Philosopher

Frédéric Gros (French: [ɡʁo]; born 30 November 1965) is a French philosopher. He is a specialist in the work of Michel Foucault and an editor of Foucault's papers.

His 2008 book Marcher, une philosophie is a bestseller in France and has been translated into several languages. An English translation by John Howe, titled A Philosophy of Walking, was published by Verso Books in 2014.

== Awards and honors ==
- 2007 Prix Bordin of the Académie des sciences morales et politiques
- Prix du livre incorrect 2018
- Prix lycéen du livre de philosophie 2019

== Publications ==
- Gros, Frédéric (1996). Michel Foucault (in French) (1st ed.). Paris: Presses universitaires de France. p. 126. ISBN 978-2-13-047686-3. 2130476864.
- —————— (1997). Foucault et la folie (in French) (1st ed.). Paris: Presses universitaires de France. p. 126. ISBN 978-2-13-049075-3. 2130490751.
- ——————; Thierry Pech (2001). Et ce sera justice. Punir en démocratie (in French). Paris: Odile Jacob. p. 330. ISBN 978-2-7381-1022-0. 2738110223.
- (dir.), Foucault. Le courage de la vérité, Presses universitaires de France, coll. « Débats philosophiques », Paris, 2002, 168 p. ISBN 2130523315
- —————— (2006). États de violence : essai sur la fin de la guerre (in French). Paris: Gallimard. p. 304. ISBN 978-2-07-077451-7. 2070774511.
- —————— (2008). Marcher, une philosophie (in French). Paris: Carnets Nord. p. 304. ISBN 978-2-35536-008-4.
- —————— (2012). Le Principe sécurité (in French). Paris: Gallimard. p. 304. ISBN 978-2-07-013350-5.
- —————— (2016). Possédées (novel) (in French). Paris: Albin Michel. p. 280. ISBN 978-2-226-32880-9.
- —————— (2017). Désobéir (in French). Paris: Albin Michel. p. 144. ISBN 978-2-226-39528-3.
- —————— (2019). Le Guérisseur des Lumières (novel) (in French). Paris: Albin Michel. p. 176. ISBN 978-2-226-44387-8.
- —————— (2021). La honte est un sentiment révolutionnaire (in French). Paris: Albin Michel. p. 234. ISBN 9782226445797.
