= Albert Vogt =

François Charles Albert Vogt (5 August 1874 – 4 October 1942) was a Swiss Roman Catholic priest and historian of the Byzantine Empire. Born in Geneva to the architect Louis Arthur Vogt and Jeanne Marie Dépierre, he was orphaned at an early age and was raised by his maternal grandmother. After theological studies at the Catholic Saint-Sulpice Seminary in Paris, he was ordained as a priest in 1899. In 1908 he became a doctor of letters at the Sorbonne University, going on to work as a professor of history at the University of Freiburg from 1910 to 1919. At the same time, he administered the parish of Sacré-Cœur in Geneva in 1914–1918, and served as archpriest of the Basilica of Our Lady of Geneva from 1918 to 1929. After that, he returned to his historical studies on the Byzantine period, and was co-editor of the Dictionnaire d'histoire et de géographie ecclésiastiques.

== Main works ==
- Basile Ier, empereur de Byzance (867–886), et la civilisation byzantine à la fin du IXe siècle. Picard, Paris 1908. Won the Prix Bordin in 1909.
- Vie de S. Luc le stylite. In: Analecta Bollandiana. 28, 1909, pp. 5–56.
- Le théâtre à Byzance et dans l’empire du IVe au XIIIe siècle I. Le théâtre profane. Bière, Bordeaux 1932.
- Oraison funèbre de Basile I par son fils Léon VI le Sage. Éditée avec introduction et traduction par Albert Vogt et Irenée Haussherr. Pontificium Institutum Orientalium Studiorum, Rome 1932 (Orientalia Christiana. 26, 1).
- Constantin VII Porphyrogénète. Le Livre des cérémonies. (4 vols.) Les Belles Lettres, Paris 1935–1940. Reprinted in 1967.
- L’hippodrome de Constantinople. in: Byzantion. 10, 1935, pp. 471–488.

== Sources ==
- Hansjörg Roth: Albert Vogt in German, French and Italian in the online Historical Dictionary of Switzerland, 04 July 2012.
