= Armand Delatte =

Belgian historian and philologist

- Born: Armand-Louis-Joseph Delatte; October 12, 1886; Ville-en-Hesbaye, Belgium
- Died: September 10, 1964 (aged 77); Liège, Belgium

Academic background
- Education: University of Liège; École pratique des hautes études

Academic work
- Discipline: Classical philology, history of philosophy, history of religion
- Institutions: University of Liège

Armand-Louis-Joseph Delatte (12 October 1886 – 10 September 1964) was a Belgian classical philologist, historian of philosophy, and historian of religion. He served as a professor at the University of Liège. He was a specialist in Pythagoreanism, ancient Greek magic, astrology, Greek botany, and the history of Greek science. He co-founded the academic journal L'Antiquité classique in 1932.

== Biography ==
=== Early life ===
Armand Delatte was born on 12 October 1886 in Ville-en-Hesbaye, a village in eastern Belgium. He received his secondary education at the Petit Séminaire de Saint-Roch in Ferrières. He then entered the University of Liège, where he studied under the classical scholars Joseph Michel, Léon Parmentier, Jean-Pierre Waltzing, and Léon Halkin. He graduated from the university in 1908 with a doctorate in philosophy and letters.

Delatte's academic work earned him a travel scholarship in 1909 and the title of laureate in the Belgian Concours universitaire in 1910. These grants allowed him to pursue postgraduate studies abroad in Bonn and Paris. In Paris, he studied at the École pratique des hautes études (EPHE), graduating with the diploma of élève diplômé in 1915.

From 1912 to 1914, Delatte served as a foreign member of the French School at Athens. During his two years in Greece, he dedicated himself to searching for and collating unpublished Greek manuscripts in Athens libraries.

Upon returning from Greece at the outbreak of World War I, Delatte began teaching in secondary education, serving as a professor at the state high schools (athénées) of Chimay and Liège between 1914 and 1921. During this period, he received the Prix Zographos (1917) from the Association pour l'encouragement des études grecques en France and the Prix Gantrelle (1921) from the Royal Academy of Belgium.

=== Professorship at Liège ===
From 1921 to 1923, Delatte was supported by a fellowship from the Belgian Fondation Universitaire. In 1922, he defended his habilitation (doctorat spécial) in classical philology at the University of Liège. He was appointed a lecturer at Liège in 1923, and was promoted to full professor in 1928.

Delatte taught at Liège for 34 academic years. He retired and transitioned to emeritus status at the end of the 1956–1957 academic year. His teaching curriculum covered ancient and Byzantine Greek language and literature, Greek institutions, epigraphy, paleography, and introductory classical philology. In his Latin language courses, he focused on Roman Stoicism and frequently commented on the writings of Seneca the Younger. He was known as a demanding but deeply committed educator.

In 1932, Delatte co-founded the academic journal L'Antiquité classique along with other Belgian classicists, guiding its publication and contributing scientific papers for over twenty-five years. He also helped edit the Revue belge de Philologie et d'Histoire and launched the journal Humanisme, which advocated for classical education. He worked with the Association des Classiques de Liège.

Delatte held administrative and scholarly roles in several institutions. He was active in the Union Académique Internationale, the Belgian Committee for the History of Sciences (Comité belge d'Histoire des sciences), the Council of the Royal Library of Belgium, and the Bureau of Bibliographic Documentation of Byzantine and Slavic Studies. He also served as the academic secretary of the Royal Academy of Belgium for the year 1950–1951.

=== Personal life ===
Delatte died in Liège on 10 September 1964, at the age of 77.

Delatte's son, Louis Delatte, followed his father into classical philology and spent his career as a professor at the University of Liège from 1943 to 1983. Louis was interested in the application of statistical methods and computers to the study of ancient languages. He founded the Laboratoire d'analyse statistique des langues anciennes (LASLA) in 1961. Armand and Louis collaborated on several academic projects, including studies of Byzantine geomancy.

== Research ==
Delatte authored fifteen books and numerous scholarly articles focusing on ancient Greek religion, science, philosophy, and manuscripts.

=== Pythagoreanism ===
Early in his career, Delatte established himself as a leading authority on Pythagoreanism. In his monographs Études sur la littérature pythagoricienne (1915) and Essai sur la politique pythagoricienne (1922), he analyzed the literary traditions, political philosophies, and social structures of the Pythagorean communities. He also published a critical edition and commentary of Diogenes Laërtius's biography of Pythagoras (La Vie de Pythagore de Diogène Laërce, 1922). Later in life, he returned to this interest with a study on the influence of Pythagoreanism on the United States Constitution (La Constitution des États-Unis et les pythagoriciens, 1948).

=== Greek magic, science, and religion ===
Delatte dedicated much of his scholarship to the history of ancient Greek magic, divination, and religion, often linking these practices to the history of science. He published the Anecdota Atheniensia, a two-volume edition of previously unpublished Greek texts from manuscript collections in Athens. The first volume (1927) compiled texts related to the history of religions (including ancient magic, rituals, and folklore), while the second volume (1939) focused on texts relating to the history of sciences (such as ancient medicine, astrology, and alchemy).

His studies in ancient occultism and ritual practices included:

- La catoptromancie grecque et ses dérivés (1932), a historical study of divination using mirrors (catoptromancy).
- Herbarius: Recherches sur le cérémonial usité chez les anciens pour la cueillette des simples et des plantes magiques (1936 / 1938 2nd edition), which examined the magical and religious rituals used by ancient gatherers when collecting medicinal plants (simples) and magic herbs.
- Le Cycéon, breuvage rituel des mystères d'Éleusis (1955), an investigation into the nature and religious significance of the kykeon, the ritual drink consumed during the Eleusinian Mysteries.
- Les intailles magiques gréco-égyptiennes (1964), which analyzed the iconography and symbolism of Greco-Egyptian magical amulets and gems.

=== Other studies ===
Other works include:

- La Musique au tombeau dans l'antiquité (1913).
- Les Manuscrits à miniatures et à ornements des bibliothèques d'Athènes (1926).
- Le Troisième Livre des Souvenirs socratiques de Xénophon: Étude critique (1933), a critical and philological study of the third book of Xenophon's Memorabilia.
- Les Conceptions de l'enthousiasme chez les philosophes présocratiques (1934), exploring the philosophical concepts of divine inspiration and enthusiasm among the Pre-Socratic philosophers.
- Les Portulans grecs (1957), a detailed study and edition of Byzantine and early modern Greek portolan charts (nautical charts).

== Honors and decorations ==
Some honors Delatte received include:

- Member of the Royal Academy of Belgium (corresponding member, 1930; full member, 1937)
- Corresponding member of the Institut de France
- Corresponding member of the Academy of Athens
- Honorary doctorate (Doctor honoris causa) from the University of Lyon
- Prix Zographos of the Association pour l'encouragement des études grecques en France (1917)
- Prix Gantrelle of the Royal Academy of Belgium (1921)
- Prix Bordin of the Académie des Inscriptions et Belles-Lettres (1923)
- Decennial Prize for Classical and Oriental Philology of Belgium (for the period 1930–1939, awarded in 1946)
- Grand Officer of the Order of Leopold (Belgium)
- Grand Officer of the Order of the Crown (Belgium)

== Selected works ==
- Delatte, Armand (1913). La Musique au tombeau dans l'antiquité. Paris: Champion.
- Delatte, Armand (1915). Études sur la littérature pythagoricienne. Paris: Champion.
- Delatte, Armand (1922). Essai sur la politique pythagoricienne. Liège / Paris: Vaillant-Carmanne / Champion.
- Delatte, Armand (1922). La Vie de Pythagore de Diogène Laërce. Brussels: Lamertin.
- Delatte, Armand (1926). Les Manuscrits à miniatures et à ornements des bibliothèques d'Athènes. Liège / Paris: Vaillant-Carmanne / Champion.
- Delatte, Armand (1927). Anecdota Atheniensia, Tome I: Textes grecs inédits relatifs à l'histoire des religions. Liège / Paris: Vaillant-Carmanne / Champion.
- Delatte, Armand (1932). La catoptromancie grecque et ses dérivés. Liège / Paris: Vaillant-Carmanne / Droz.
- Delatte, Armand (1933). Le Troisième Livre des Souvenirs socratiques de Xénophon: Étude critique. Liège / Paris: Vaillant-Carmanne / Droz.
- Delatte, Armand (1934). Les Conceptions de l'enthousiasme chez les philosophes présocratiques. Paris: Droz.
- Delatte, Armand; Delatte, Louis (1936). "Un traité byzantin de géomancie". Mélanges Franz Cumont. 4. Annuaire de l'Institut de philologie et d'histoire orientales et slaves: 575–658.
- Delatte, Armand; Delatte, Louis (1937). "Un chapitre de géomancie du codex Vaticanus Palatinus 312". Mélanges offerts à A.-M. Desrousseaux par ses amis et ses élèves. Paris: Hachette: 113–122.
- Delatte, Armand (1938). Herbarius: Recherches sur le cérémonial usité chez les anciens pour la cueillette des simples et des plantes magiques. Liège / Paris: Faculté de Philosophie et Lettres / Droz.
- Delatte, Armand (1939). Anecdota Atheniensia, Tome II: Textes grecs relatifs à l'histoire des sciences. Liège / Paris: Faculté de Philosophie et Lettres / Droz.
- Delatte, Armand (1948). La Constitution des États-Unis et les pythagoriciens. Paris: Belles Lettres.
- Delatte, Armand (1955). Le Cycéon, breuvage rituel des mystères d'Éleusis. Paris: Belles Lettres.
- Delatte, Armand (1957). Les Portulans grecs. Liège / Paris: Faculté de Philosophie et Lettres / Belles Lettres.
- Delatte, Armand (1964). Les intailles magiques gréco-égyptiennes. Paris: Bibliothèque nationale.
