= Charles Lécrivain =

French classicist (1860–1942)

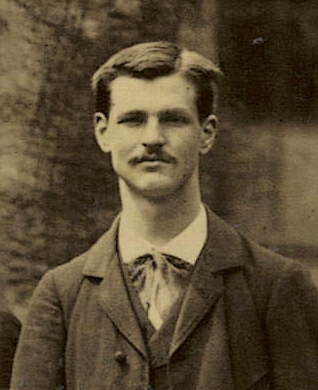
Charles Lécrivain, 1880

Charles Lécrivain was a French classicist (1860–1942). Lécrivain graduated from the École Normale Supérieure. He finished his doctorate theses in 1888, which later became classics on those subjects (see below). Lécrivain was one of the prominent contributors to the "Dictionnaire des Antiquités grecques et romaines".

== Publications ==
De agris publicis imperatoriisque ab Augusti tempore usque ad finem imperii romani, Paris 1887.

Le sénat romain depuis Dioclétien à Rome et à Constantinople, Paris 1888.

238 articles in "Dictionnaire des Antiquités grecques et romaines". The most notables are: Eisphora, Epikleros, Eupatrides, Helotae, Phratria, Phylë, Prytaneia, Trapezitai, Gens, Hospitium, Latifundia, Lictor, Manumissio, Patricii, Patrimonium, Plebs, Praetor, Quaestor, Senatus, Tribuni plebis, and Vicarius.

== Bibliography ==
- Dupont-Ferrier, Gustave (1942), "Éloge funèbre de M. Charles Lécrivain, correspondant français de l'Académie", Comptes rendus de l'Académie des inscriptions et belles-lettres, 86th year, N. 2-3, pp. 88–89
