= Louis Ratisbonne =

French essayist (1827–1900)

Louis G. F. Ratisbonne
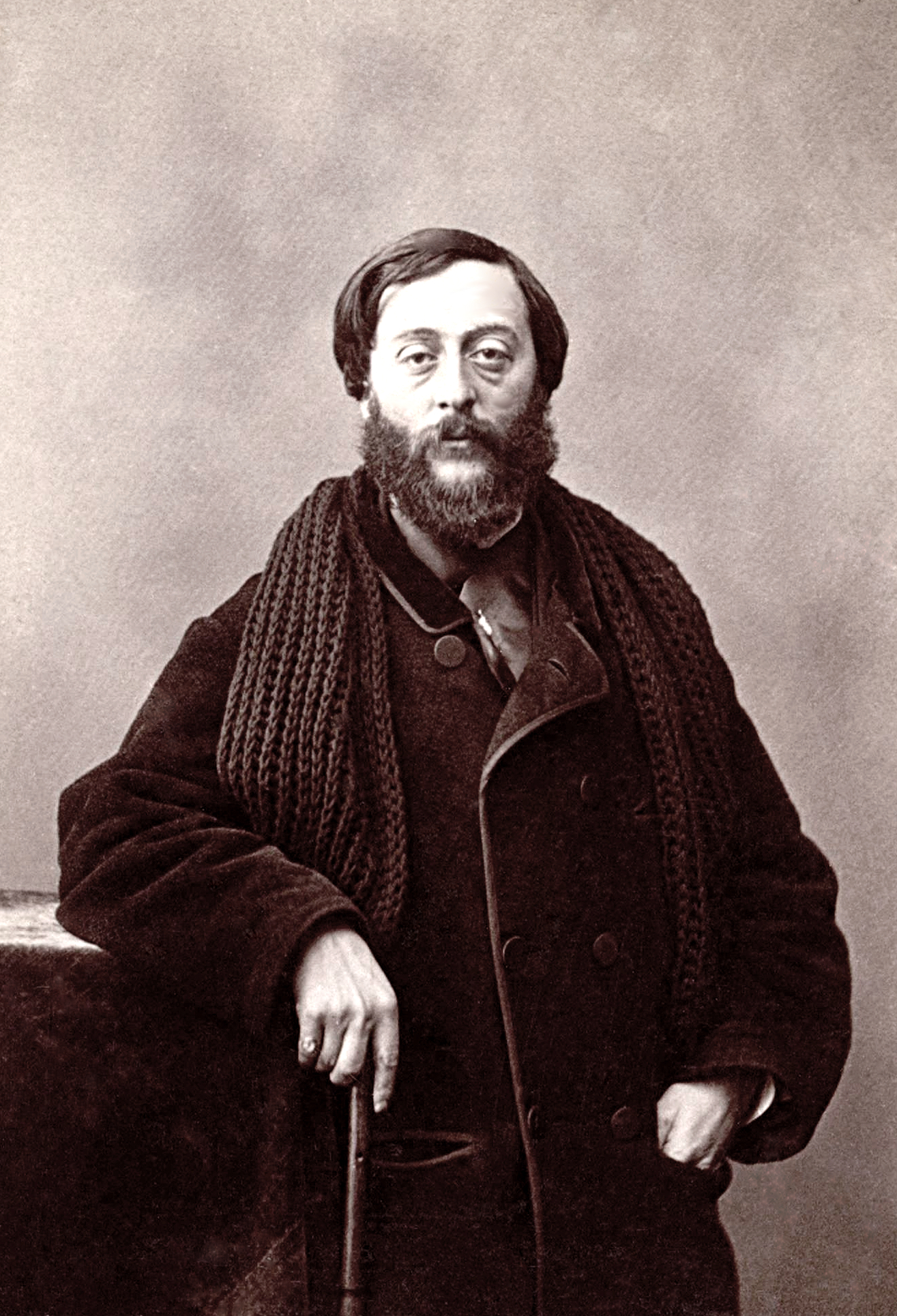
- Louis Ratisbonne (Nadar)
- Born: 29 July 1827; Strasbourg, France
- Died: 24 September 1900 (aged 73); Paris, France

Louis Gustave Fortuné Ratisbonne (29 July 1827 – 24 September 1900) was a French man of letters.

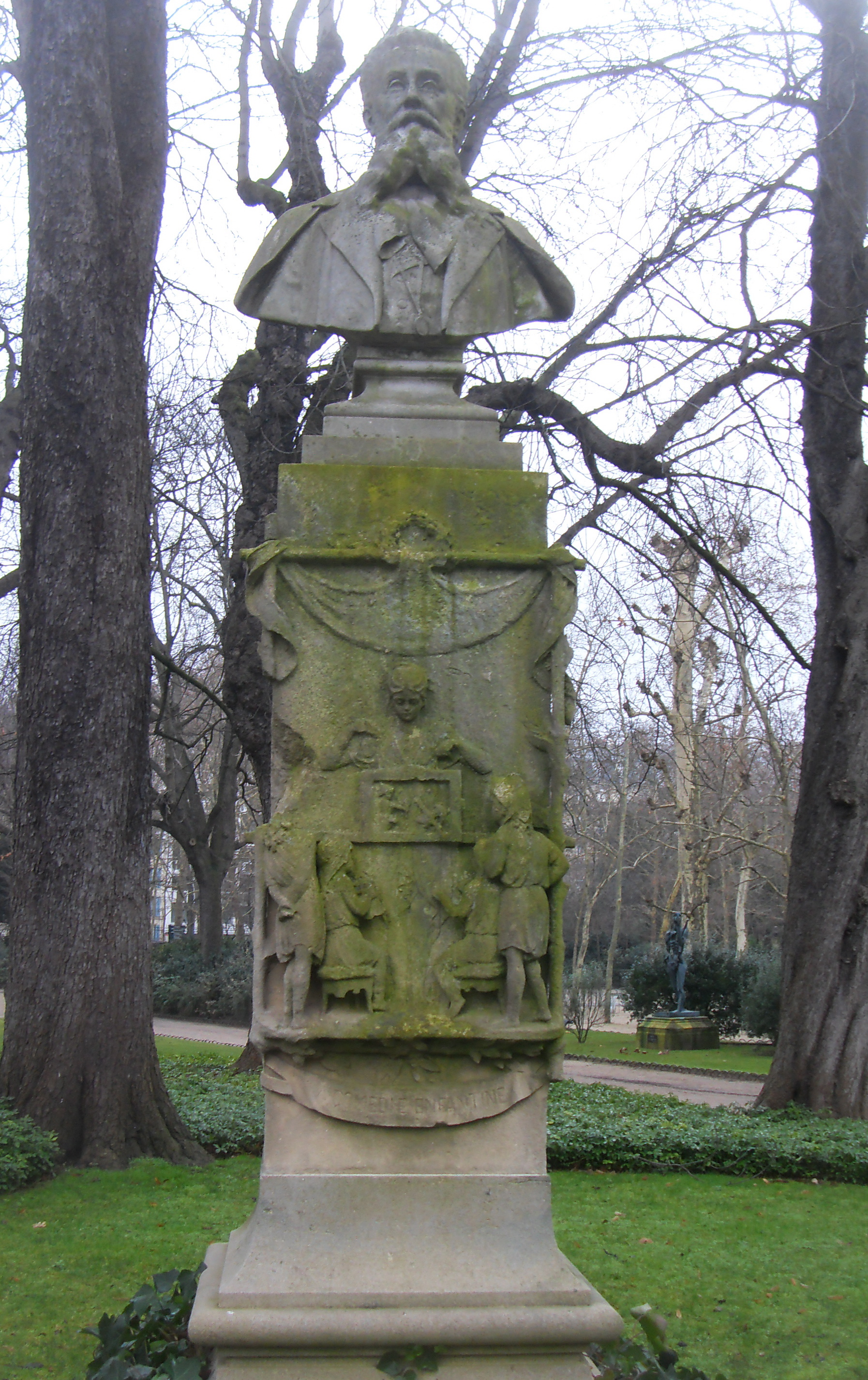
Monument à Louis Ratisbonne par Émile Soldi, Paris, jardin du Luxembourg.

He was born at Strasbourg. He was the son of the banker Adolphe Ratisbonne and his wife Charlotte Oppenheim (daughter of Salomon Oppenheim), and the nephew of the priests Marie Theodor Ratisbonne and Marie-Alphonse Ratisbonne. He studied at the school of his native town and at the College Henry IV in Paris. He was connected with the Journal des Debats from 1853 to 1876; became librarian of the palace of Fontainebleau in 1871, and three years later to the Senate.

Louis Ratisbonne's most important work was a verse translation of the La Divina Commedia (The Divine Comedy), in which the original is rendered tercet by tercet into French. L'Enfer (1852) was crowned by the academy; Le Purgatoire (1857) and Le Paradis (1859) received the prix Bordin.

He is also the author of some charming fables and verses for children: La Comédie enfantine (1860), Les Figures jeunes (1865) and others. He was literary executor of Alfred de Vigny, whose Destinées (1864) and Journal d'un poète (1867) he published. Ratisbonne died in Paris.

Through the influence of Thiers, Ratisbonne was appointed librarian at Fontainbleau, where he succeeded Octave Feuillet, and later he was transferred to the Palais du Luxembourg.
