= Louis-Fernand Flutre =

French academic (1892-1978)

Louis-Fernand Flutre (21 June 1892 - 1978) was a French academic.

A former student of the École Normale Supérieure, he was a professeur agrégé in a lycée before teaching in the Faculty of Letters in Lyon.

He published a hundred works, most notably on French literature (and some on the language of Picardy).

He submitted his doctoral thesis in 1932 at the Sorbonne, entitled Li Fet des Romains dans les littératures française et italienne du XIIIe au XIVe siècle.

== Selected works ==
- Précis de grammaire grecque (with Charles Maquet), Paris 1925
- De Bello Gallico (Extraits). Annotés, Paris 1928
- Selectae e profanis scriptoribus Historiae. Historiettes tirées des écrivains latins, Paris 1929
- (Ed. with Kornelis Sneyders de Vogel) Li fet des Romains compilé ensemble de Saluste et de Suetoine et de Lucan. Texte du XIIIe siècle, publié pour la première fois d'après les meilleurs manuscrits, 2 vols., Paris/Groningen 1935-1938, Genf 1977
- Le parler picard de Mesnil-Martinsart (Somme). Phonétique, morphologie, syntaxe, vocabulaire, Genf/Lille 1955
- Mesnil-Martinsart. Somme, essai d'histoire locale, Lyon 1955
- Recherches sur les éléments prégaulois dans la toponymie de la Lozère, Paris 1957
- Pour une étude de la toponymie de l'Afrique Occidentale Française, Dakar 1957
- Plus est en vous. Fantaisie brugeoise; 14 sonnets à la louange de Bruges (with Léon Lafoscade), Lyon 1957
- Table des noms propres avec toutes leurs variantes figurant dans les romans du Moyen âge écrits en français ou en provençal et actuellement publiés ou analysés, Poitiers 1962
- Le Moyen picard d'après les textes littéraires du temps (1560-1660). Textes, lexique, grammaire, Amiens/Paris 1970
- Du moyen picard au picard moderne, Amiens 1977
