= Avignon–Comtat Venaissin War =

War within the French Papal States (1790–1791)

- Part of French Revolution
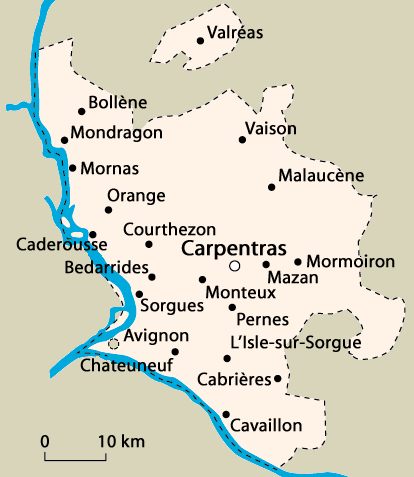
- Territories of Avignon and Comtat Venaissin
Date	12 June 1790 – 19 June 1791
Location	Avignon and Comtat Venaissin, Papal States
Result	Avignon-allied victory
Territorial changes	Avignon and Comtat Venaissin annexed into France

Belligerents
Revolutionary Avignon municipal government Kingdom of France	Papal States: Comtat Venaissin; Union of St. Cecilia (from 1791)

Commanders and leaders
Chevalier Patrice †; Jourdan Coupe-tête (Note: Jourdan's full name was Mathieu Jouve dit Jourdan but adopted the surname Coupe-tête (meaning "Head-Cutter") because he claimed to have cut off Governor Delaunay's head after the Bastille was taken); Jean Duprat; Minveille	Pope Pius VI; Filippo Casoni

Strength
3,000–15,000; 6,000	Several thousand

Following the unanimous declaration of the various district assemblies of Avignon on 12 June 1790, to secede from the Papal States and unite with France, war broke out between the municipal government of Avignon and the more conservative Comtat Venaissin, the larger county (comtat) which co-existed with Avignon and still pledged loyalty to the Papal States. Avignon, which had been inspired by the intentions of the French Revolution, soon received the support of French troops placed under its control, augmenting the Avignon forces that had laid siege to Carpentras, ending the government of the Comtat. However, hardline counter-revolutionary regions of the Comtat under the name the "Union of St. Cecilia" continued fighting until June 1791.

In spring 1791, with the rejection of the Civil Constitution of the Clergy and the threat of violence spreading into neighbouring departments, France brokered a peace between the warring factions and organized a referendum in July 1791; with the majority of the population voting in favor of union with France, both Avignon and the Comtat Venaissin were officially annexed on 14 September 1791.

== Background ==
=== History ===
What eventually became the Comtat Venaissin was acquired by Philip III of France after becoming Count of Toulouse in 1271. He ceded it to the papacy in 1273. Later, Avignon was sold to the papacy by Joanna I, Queen of Naples and Countess of Provence, in 1348, whereupon the two comtats were joined to form a unified papal enclave geographically, though retaining their separate political identities.

For the most part, residents of the two entities never showed much open discontent with their status as subjects of the pope as they were granted special privileges such as little to no tax burden and no military service duties. However, throughout the 1700s, a series of events would come together to intensify a desire among some of the populace for union with France. A big factor was that despite the long rule of the Italian Papal States, the people of the two entities were, as one early 1800s historian put it, "French by instinct, by language, by character, by nature." This situation was opposed to the enlightenment idea of the harmonization of knowledge and practical reality, which caused Avignon, where state boundaries did not correspond with cultural and linguistic divisions, to be seen as a relic of medieval times in an increasingly rational and well-balanced political order. This idea was further enforced in part due to favorable memories of French occupation between 1768 and 1774 due to the Seven Years' War, which made merchants in Avignon aware of the benefits of formal membership in the French economy. More immediately, locals blamed popular deprivations due to poor harvests and the harsh winter in 1788–1789 on dithering papal officials, which forced large quantities of food to be imported from France.

=== 1790 municipal elections ===
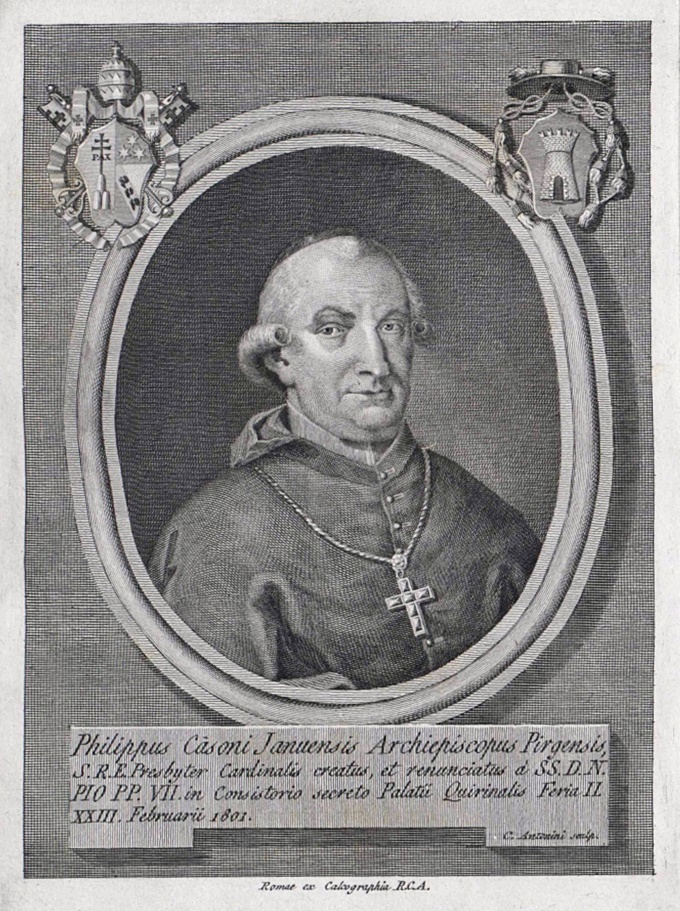
Casoni in 1805

In March 1789, this situation led to a food riot in Avignon causing the formation of a Bourgeois Guard (French: Garde Bourgeoise), a name briefly used a few weeks later when the Paris element of the French Revolution created the precursor to the National Guard. Inspired by the French Revolution, riots would continue throughout the later months of 1789 with a "French party" beginning to manifest activity. Following new unrest in February 1790 that led to the resignation of the town council, Filippo Casoni, the vice-legate and pope's representative in Avignon, on 25 March, authorized reformed municipal elections on the condition of the pope's eventual blessing. The vote returned mostly moderate pro-French patriots, merchants, and lawyers. This new municipality abolished the Strappado and the Inquisition.

On 10 April, new protests led to Casoni agreeing to all demands for reform. However, on 21 April, the pope rejected all concessions given by Casoni, pushing most residents of Avignon to the recognition that change would only happen through union with France. Despite the will of the pope, the municipal government maintained itself in power.

On 10 June, pro-papacy aristocratic forces attempted to take over the Hôtel de Ville in Avignon, setting off another round of protest. Intervention by the French mayor of nearby Orange and a detachment of National Guards prevented bloodshed.

== War ==
=== War with the Comtat ===
On 12 June the district of Saint Symphorien within Avignon called for union with France, following its lead the General Council of the Avignon Commune on the same day declared the city "unanimously deliberated to declare the people of the Avignon nation free, sovereign, and independent, and to unite with the French nation," sending four envoys to request union to the National Assembly in person. The French constitution and French laws were adopted, abolishing the authority of the vice-legate.

Casoni fled to Carpentras, the capital of the Comtat. While having agreed to adopt the French constitution and reforms, the Comtat had remained loyal to the Papal States. The respective newspapers of the two towns began a propaganda war.

The cause of Avignon is that of the universe, it is that of liberty

— Maximilien Robespierre, Debate of 18 November 1790

Since the start of events in Avignon and the Comtat, the French had taken an ambiguous stance on the issue. The first formal request for union came in November 1789 from Charles-François Bouche, a Third Estate deputy from nearby Aix-en-Provence. At the time, and even after the request for union from Avignon, most deputies were afraid of either offending European powers or antagonizing the pope – who had the Civil Constitution of the Clergy under consideration at the time of the request from Avignon. Notably, Maximilien Robespierre was one of the few who, early on, embraced the cause of Avignon.

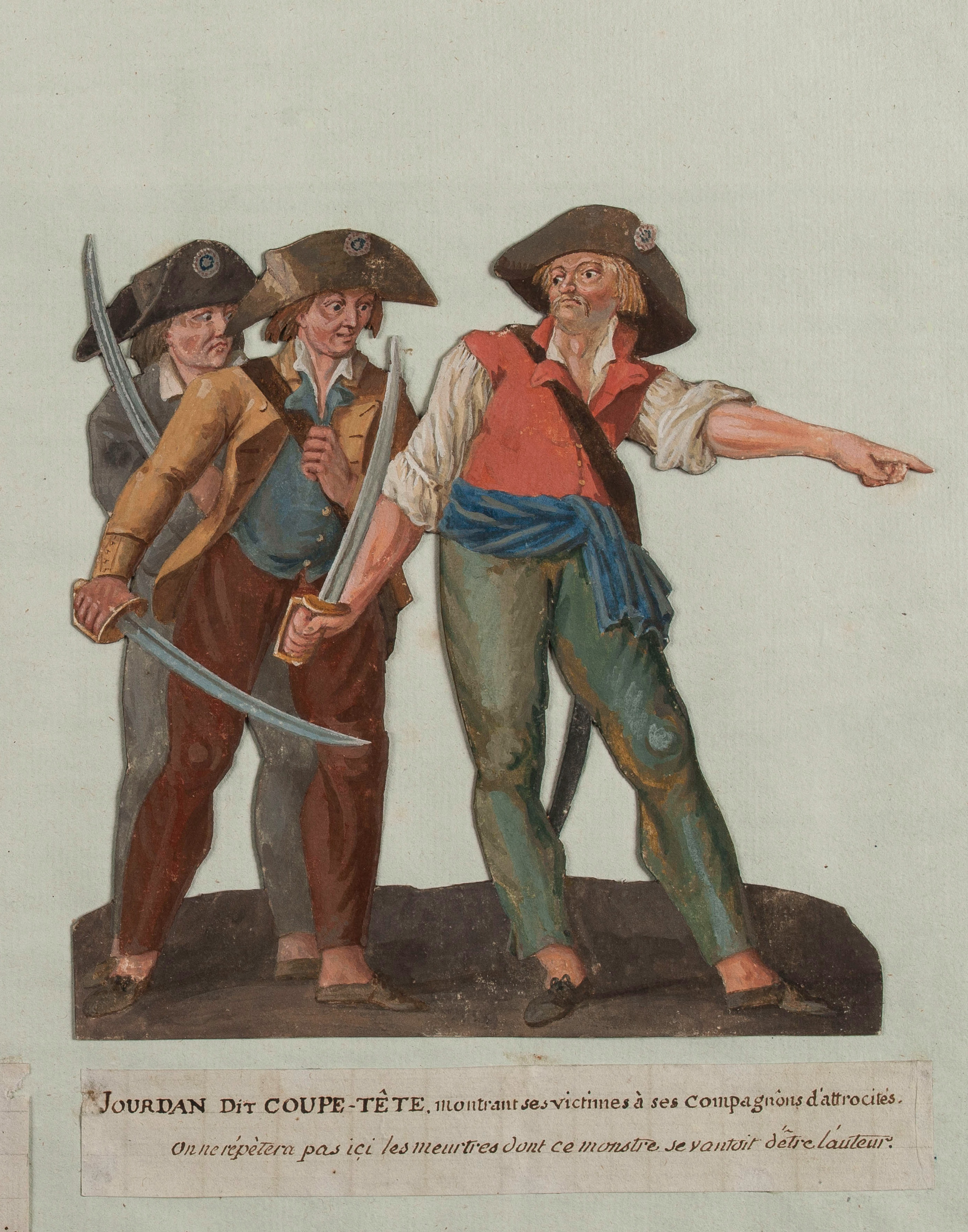
Drawing of Jourdan by Jean-Baptiste Lesueur, circa 1793-1794

By mid-1790, a sizeable military force known as the Avignon "patriot army," comprising approximately 3,000–15,000 individuals, had been organized and led by Chevalier Patrice, with Duprat, Minveille, and Jourdan Coupe-tête serving as his lieutenants. Concurrently, following a series of skirmishes between the opposing sides, Carpentras had begun to amass arms. Guns destined for the town were discovered at Orange, hidden in barrels of cheese, and promptly confiscated. Furthermore, a foundry, ostensibly for bells, was established and gunpowder, lead, wheat and other provisions were stockpiled.

In mid-July, commissioners of the Assembly of Representatives of the Comtat took control of the town of Cavaillon, which sided with Avignon. In the wake of this event, troops from the sympathetic communes of Camaret, Lapalud, Caderousse, Saint- Roman, Vaqueras, Roussette, Mormoiron and Mazan marched to the town to lend their support.

On 20 November, the French National Assembly prorogued a discussion on union but, to help restore order in Avignon and the Comtat, controversially placed 6,000 French troops under the control of the municipal government in Avignon. Revolutionary Avignonais saw this move as a tacit recognition of their independence, hoping for eventual union, while the Comtat was outraged as it saw this move as a blatant violation of papal sovereignty and international law.

In January 1791, the Avignon army, against the will of the moderate council, laid siege to Cavaillon in January 1791, pillaging it. This event led many people in the Comtat to press for union with France as they did not want any more violence from Avignon.

The army then laid siege to Carpentras, effectively ending the government of the Comtat. The municipal government in Avignon proposed the federation of the city with the rest of the Comtat and invited representatives to an electoral assembly. Around 50 hardline counter-revolutionary small towns and villages of the Comtat refused to participate, and instead, on 14 March, organized themselves into a group called the "Union of St. Cecilia," which continued fighting. The expedition was ultimately a failure and the army returned to Avignon with a diminished reputation.

=== War with the Union of St. Cecilia ===
On 15 April, the army of the Union of St. Cecilia captured Vaison and put to death its mayor and his assistant, who both had close connections with the Avignon forces. In response, a contingent from Avignon consisting of 1,500 troops supported by 12 cannons advanced towards the Union's territory, engaging in combat at Sarrian. Avignon's forces successfully captured the town, proceeding to pillage and set it ablaze.

A few days later, at Monteux, while Patrice was preparing a siege of Carpentras with his officers, he was fatally shot in the head by one of his own soldiers. Patrice had been suspected of aiding in the escape of a wealthy prisoner, intended for use as ransom. Jourdan was elected as the new leader and the head of the former general was carried to Avignon.

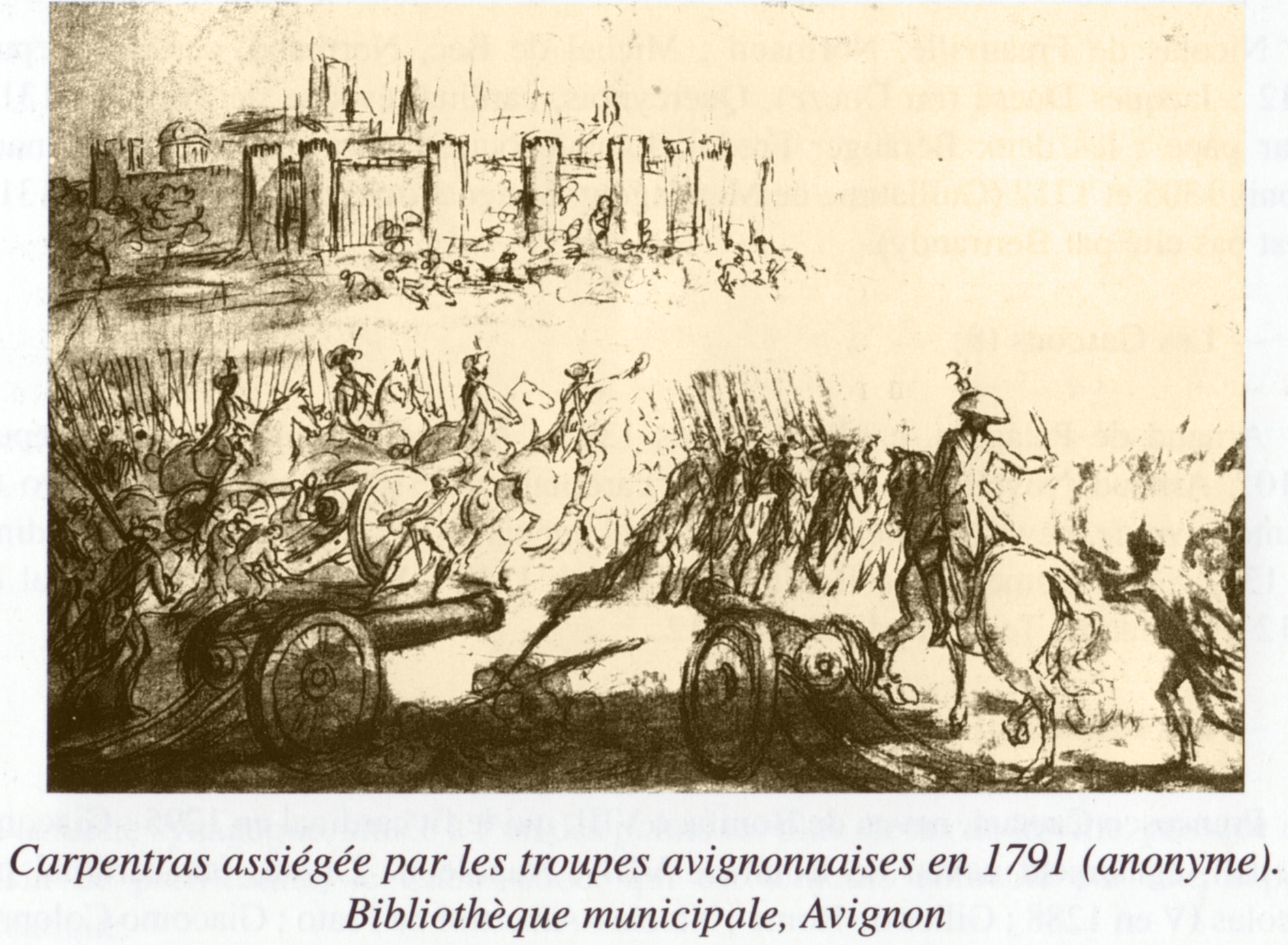
Drawing of one of the sieges of Carpentras in 1791 from the Ceccano Avignon municipal library

On 23 April, the Avignon army once again laid siege to Carpentras but was repulsed by the defenders. After its defeat, the army pillaged the countryside. The army returned on 25 April but was again repulsed by the defenders, losing more than 600 men and being pushed back to Monteux.

The army, now comprising only 6,000 men, resorted to levying contributions from Cavaillon and other neighbouring towns. Again they marched towards Carpentras, sieging it, and were pushed back with considerable losses.

Jourdan then returned to Avignon with his army, demanding the municipality to give him money and ammunition. When the council refused, Jourdan withdrew from Avignon and pillaged the surrounding countryside.

The army then came back to Carpentras, laying siege to it. After the siege began the inhabitants carried large pots pitch to the tops of the highest houses in the city, and, after setting fire to the pitch, raised dismal cries as soon as the pots were in full blaze. The army, convinced that their heated shots had taken effect and that the cries were those of despair, triumphantly advanced to force their way into the place, when a masked battery suddenly poured upon them a barrage of grapeshot, driving them back to camp. Jourdan ordered his cavalry to bring in the dead and wounded. After this major defeat, Jourdan adjusted his differences with Avignon and was liberally given supplies from the city.

=== Peace and referendum ===
In Spring 1791, with the rejection of the Civil Constitution of the Clergy and the threat of violence spreading into neighbouring departments, the French National Assembly intervened to resolve the conflict. On May 25, the Assembly dispatched three mediators tasked with negotiating peace and gauging the true sentiments of the populations in both territories. The two sides met at Orange on 13 June and on 19 June signed a peace. The Avignon army was dissolved and French troops entered Avignon. However, these were replaced with 500 National Guards. A referendum on the sovereignty of the territories was held and showed most favored union with France. Annexation was confirmed on 14 September.

== Aftermath ==
=== Coup and killings ===
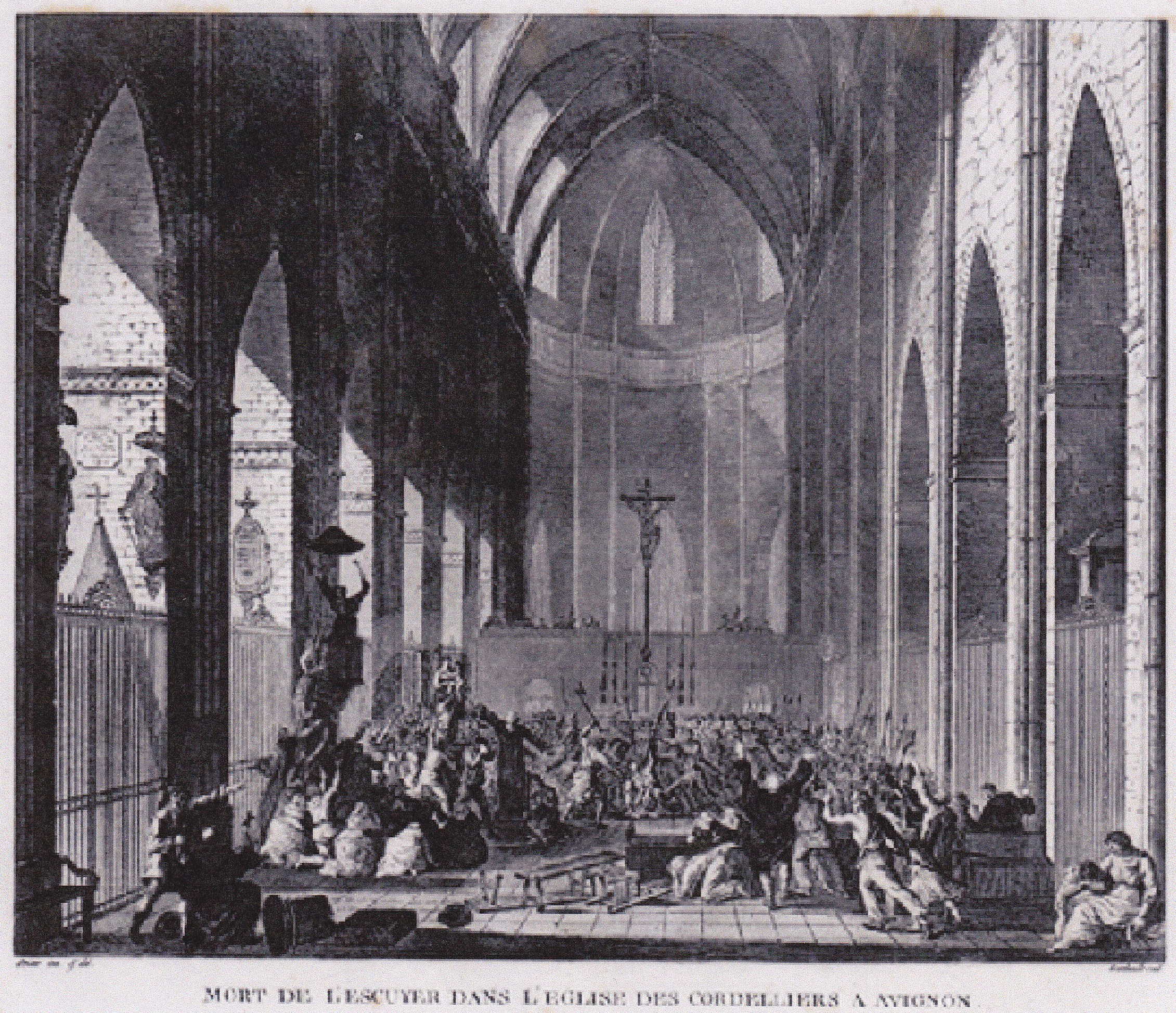
Murder of Lescuyer in the Cordeliers church

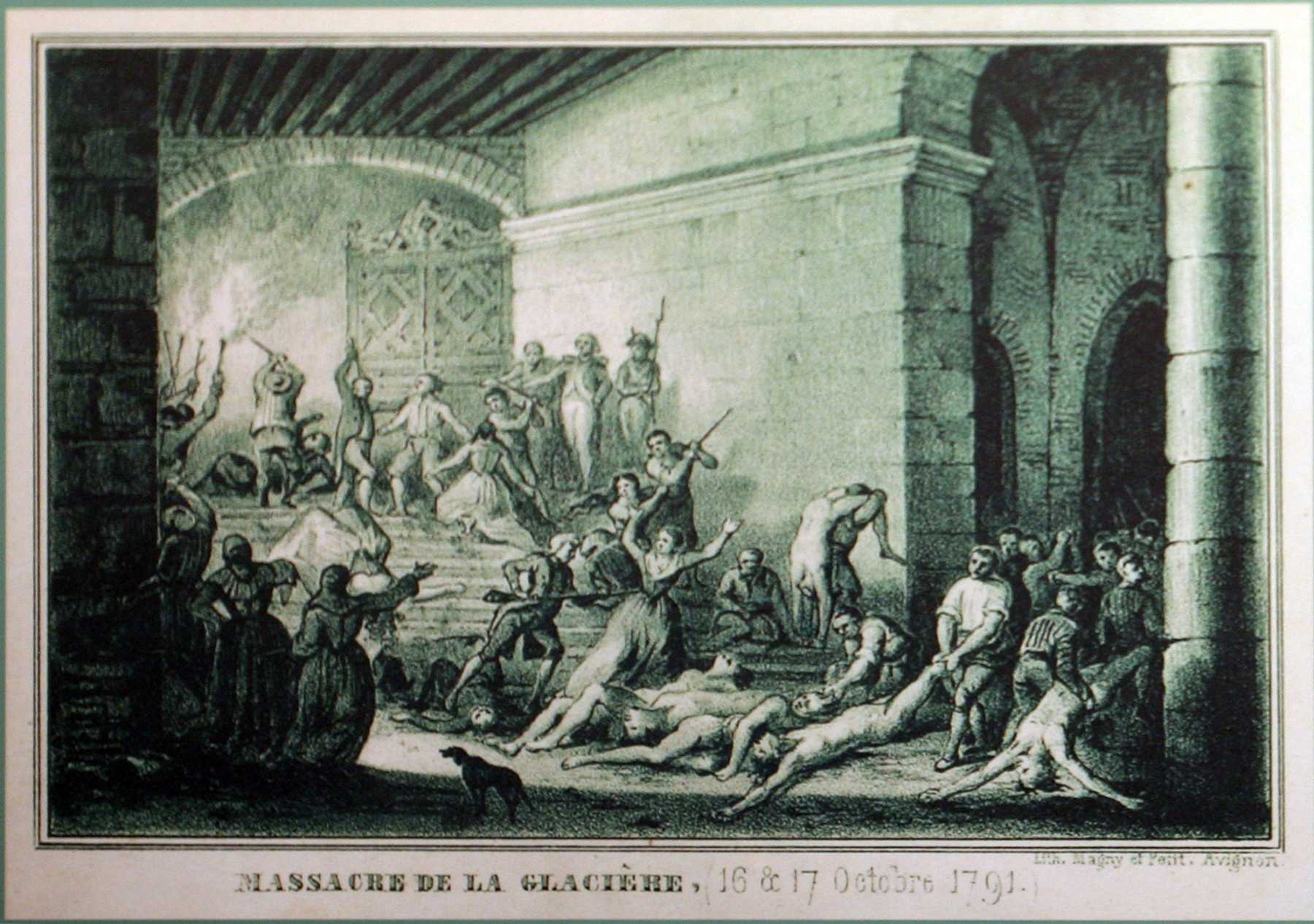
1844 illustration of the Massacres of La Glacière

On 23 August, extremists organised by Jourdan returned to Avignon under Duperat and couped the moderate city council and took control of the Palais des Papes. The moderates resisted and when Lescuyer, one of the leaders of the new extremist government, began to plunder the Mount of piety, a mob of moderates fell upon and killed him. Determined to avenge their leader and to conceal all traces of their crime before the arrival of the government troops which were daily expected, the extremists descended on the city, and, after arresting many of the respectable citizens as "suspects," thrust them into prison and there massacred some of them, killing up to 110 from 16 October to 17 October.

It wasn't until 9 November when government troops entered the city, which during the interval had been at the mercy of Jourdan and his men. Under the protection of the troops the moderate reaction, so long stifled, at once broke out; Jourdan narrowly escaped with his life, and was sent for trial to Paris. 2,000 of the bandits were driven out of Avignon, and the old municipality was reinstated. The question of sending troops to Avignon was much discussed in the Assembly during October; and that body must share with the Ministry the blame of the unpardonable delay in their despatch both before and after the massacres, by which the lives and properties of respectable citizens were placed at the mercy of a gang of murderers.

Following the massacres, new municipal elections were held in December 1791 in which the moderates emerged victorious. However, despite calls for justice, those responsible for the massacre received amnesty in April 1792, leading to the victory of the Glacièristes faction in July elections, with Duprat becoming mayor.

By 1793, Avignon found itself under the control of extreme patriots amidst the outbreak of the Federalist revolts in other southern cities against similar administrations. While remaining loyal to the Convention, Avignon faced challenges from Marseillais federalists who advanced up the Rhône, forcing the Glacièriste out of power. After the defeat of the Federalists by Jean François Carteaux, the extremists returned to power, leading to further imprisonments and massacres. The Convention subsequently decreed the establishment of the Vaucluse Department, with Avignon designated as its capital.

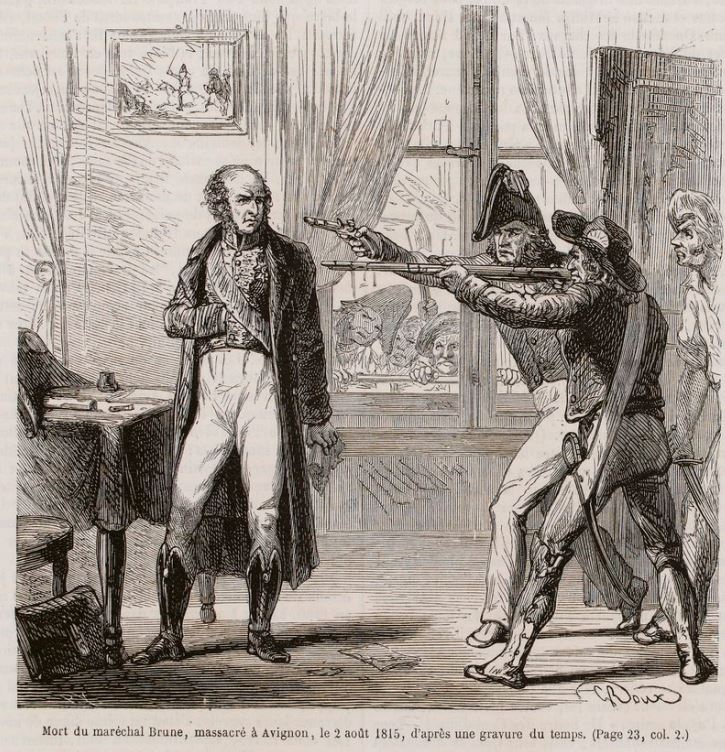
The murder of Guillaume Brune, Marshal of the Empire, by a royalist mob in Avignon on 2 August 1815, engraved c. 1865

In 1794 a series of representatives on mission, one of whom was Maignet, a pure and hard-line Robespierrist, came to Avignon. Maignet had 47 federalists killed. Jourdan was also denounced to the revolutionary tribunal and guillotined on 27 May. After the Thermidorian Reaction, Maignet was recalled to Paris. There was more revenge, and outbreaks of White Terror, dealt with by Stanislas Fréron. Under the Directory, Avignon once again became a Jacobin centre. But it was a fragile equilibrium, with a Second White Terror at the restoration of the monarchy in 1814.
