= Dupray =

Dupray is a surname. Notable people with the surname include:

- Gaston Dupray (1886–1976), Belgian film actor
- Gilles Dupray (born 1970), French athlete
- Jordan Dupray (born 1991), French-Malagasy footballer
- Micheline Dupray (1927-2019), French poet

== See also ==
- Duprat
