= 1791 Avignon–Comtat Venaissin status referendum =

July 7–24, 1791
- Outcome: Annexation into France

Results
Choice	Votes	%
Union with France	101,046	66.08%
Remain with the pope	51,873	33.92%
Total votes	152,919	100.00%

In the aftermath of the Avignon–Comtat Venaissin War, between the pro-French Avignon municipal government and the papist Union of St. Cecilia, three mediators sent by the French National Assembly organized a series of votes to discern the true opinions of the people in the Papal territories of Avignon and the Comtat Venaissin with respect to union with France.

Of the 98 municipalities, 52 voted for France and 19 for the Papal States. Annexation was confirmed by the National Assembly on September 14, 1791.

== Background ==
=== History ===
What eventually became the Comtat Venaissin was acquired by Philip III of France after becoming Count of Toulouse in 1271 who then ceded it to the papacy in 1273. Later, Avignon was sold to the papacy by Joanna I, Queen of Naples and Countess of Provence, in 1348, whereupon the two comtats were joined to form a unified papal enclave geographically, though retaining their separate political identities.

For the most part, residents of the two entities never showed much open discontent with their status as subjects of the pope as they were granted special privileges such as little to no tax burden and no military service duties. However, throughout the 1700s, a series of events would come together to intensify a desire among some of the populace for union with France. A big factor was that despite the long rule of the Italian Papal States, the people of the two entities were, as one early 1800s historian put it, "French by instinct, by language, by character, by nature." This situation was opposed to the enlightenment idea of the harmonization of knowledge and practical reality, which caused Avignon, where state boundaries did not correspond with cultural and linguistic divisions, to be seen as a relic of medieval times in an increasingly rational and well-balanced political order. This idea was further enforced in part due to favorable memories of French occupation between 1768 and 1774, which made merchants in Avignon aware of the benefits of formal membership in the French economy. More immediately, locals blamed popular deprivations due to poor harvests and the harsh winter in 1788–1789 on dithering papal officials, which forced large quantities of food to be imported from France.

=== 1790 municipal elections ===
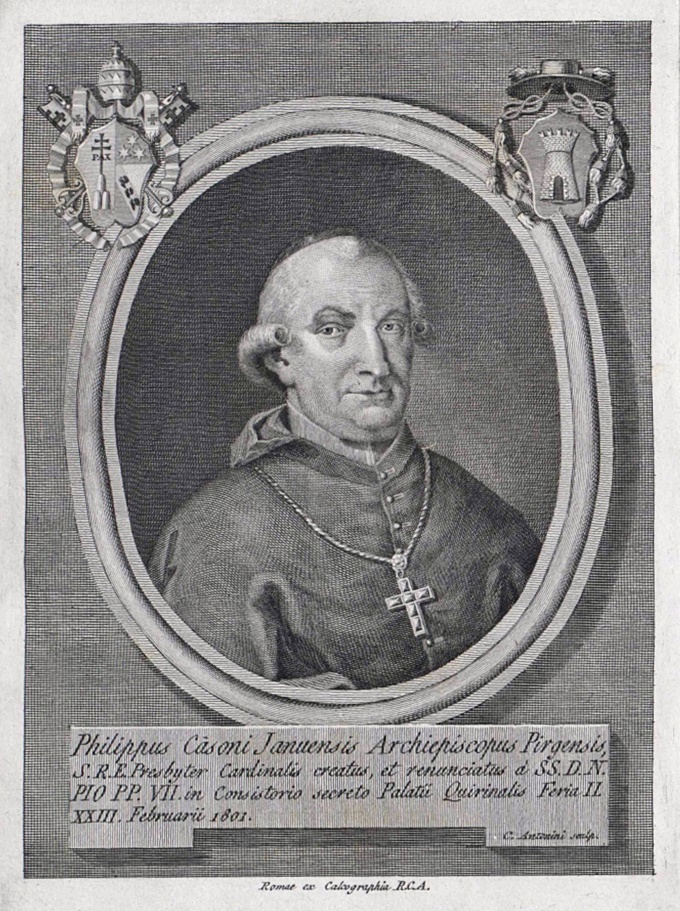
Casoni in 1805

In March 1789, this situation led to a food riot in Avignon causing the formation of a Bourgeois Guard (French: Garde Bourgeoise), a name briefly used a few weeks later when the Paris element of the French Revolution created the precursor to the National Guard. Inspired by the French Revolution, riots would continue throughout the later months of 1789 with a "French party" beginning to manifest activity. Following new unrest in February 1790 that led to the resignation of the town council, Filippo Casoni, the vice-legate and pope's representative in Avignon, on 25 March, authorized reformed municipal elections on the condition of the pope's eventual blessing. The vote elected mostly moderate pro-French patriots, merchants, and lawyers. This new municipality abolished the Strappado and the Inquisition.

On 10 April, new protests led to Casoni agreeing to all demands for reform. However, on 21 April, the pope rejected all concessions given by Casoni, pushing most residents of Avignon to the recognition that change would only happen through union with France. Despite the will of the pope, the municipal government maintained itself in power.

=== War ===
On 12 June, the various district assemblies of Avignon, following the lead of the district of Saint Symphorien, declared the city "unanimously deliberated to declare the people of the Avignon nation free, sovereign, and independent, and to unite with the French nation," sending four envoys to request union to the National Assembly in person. The French constitution and French laws were adopted, abolishing the authority of the vice-legate. Casoni fled to Carpentras, the capital of the Comtat, which while having agreed to adopt the French constitution and reforms, had remained loyal to the Papal States. The respective newspapers of the two towns began a propaganda war.

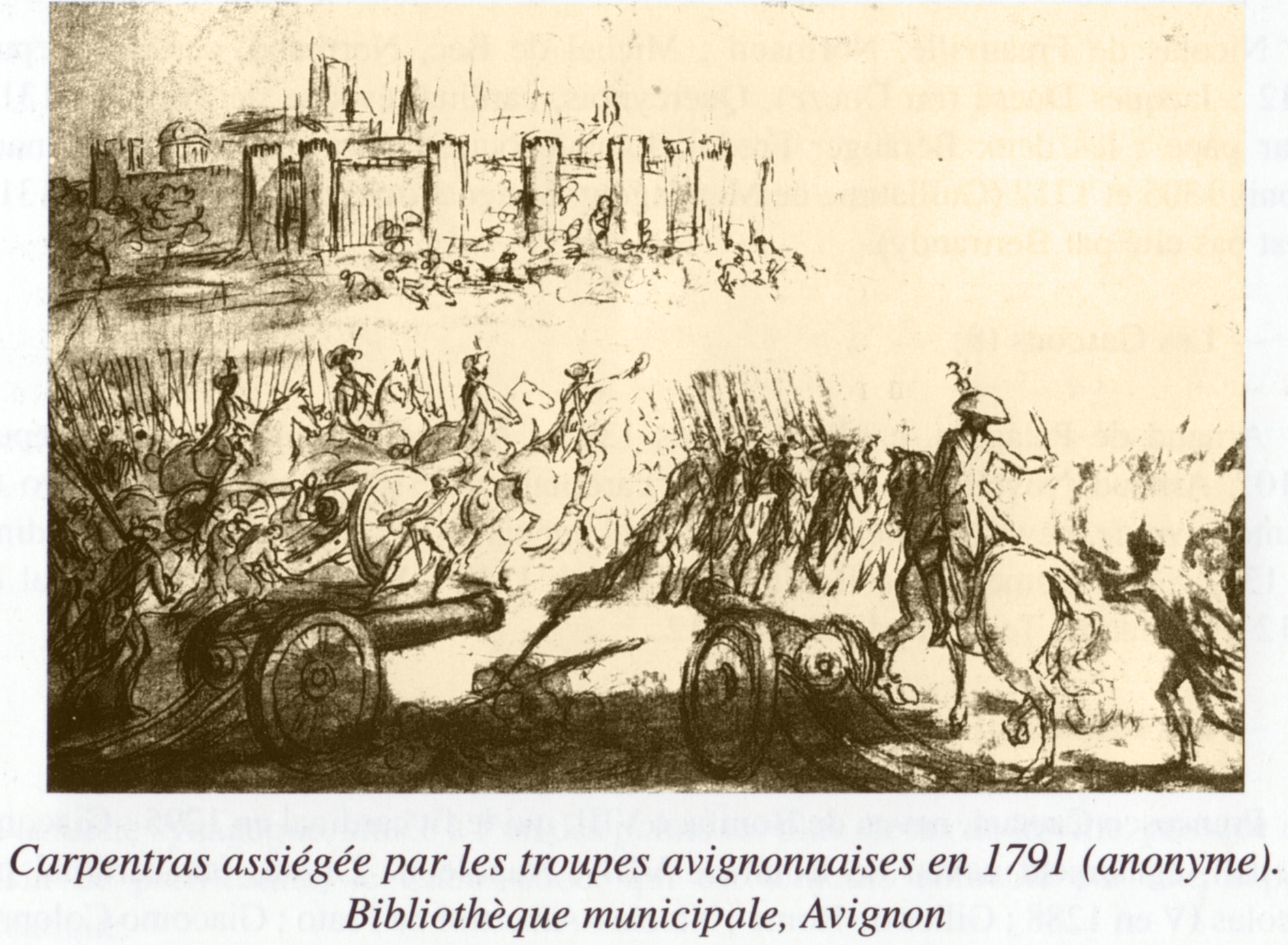
Drawing of one of the sieges of Carpentras in 1791 from the Ceccano Avignon municipal library

Avignon forces eventually laid siege to Carpentras in 1791 with the support of French troops placed under its control, effectively ending the government of the Comtat. The municipal government in Avignon proposed the federation of the city with the rest of the Comtat and invited representatives to an electoral assembly. Around 50 hardline counter-revolutionary small towns and villages of the Comtat refused to participate, and instead, on 14 March, organized themselves into a group called the "Union of St. Cecilia," which continued fighting. The expedition was ultimately a failure and the army returned to Avignon with a diminished reputation.

Fighting between Avignon and the confederation lasted for months with several failed and bloody sieges of Carpentras. In Spring 1791, with the rejection of the Civil Constitution of the Clergy and the threat of violence spreading into neighbouring departments, the French National Assembly intervened to resolve the conflict. On May 25, the Assembly dispatched three mediators tasked with negotiating peace and gauging the true sentiments of the populations in both territories. The two sides met at Orange on 13 June and on 19 June signed a peace. The Avignon army was dissolved and French troops entered Avignon. However, these were replaced with 500 National Guards.

== Results ==
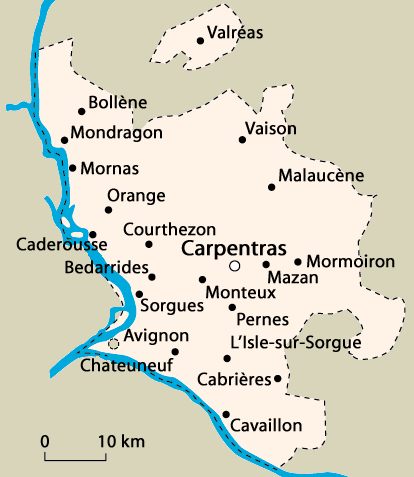
Territories of Avignon and Comtat Venaissin

The voting age was 25 and voting took place openly in the municipalities from July 7 to 24, 1791. Of the 98 municipalities that form the two states combined, 71 came together and expressed their wish. 52 voted for France and 19 for the Papal States. 17 said that they had previously affirmed a desire for union and did not feel the need to do so again; and 10 refused to make their views clear.

Jourdan Coupe-tête, (Note: Jourdan's full name was Mathieu Jouve dit Jourdan but adopted the surname Coupe-tête (meaning "Head-Cutter") because he claimed to have cut off Governor Delaunay's head after the Bastille was taken) leader of the Avignon army until its dissolution, had declared that those who voted for the Pope and against union with France should be flung immediately into the subterranean vaults beneath the church of Avignon. This was no empty threat for the vaults had shortly before been opened, and were quite ready to swallow up all who adhered to their legitimate sovereign. Similar proceedings took place in other towns but despite their threats, many of the municipalities declared their determination to maintain their allegiance to the Pope.

Choice	Votes	%
Yes	101,046	66.08
No	51,873	33.92
Total	152,919	100.00
Registered voters/turnout	152,919	–
Source: Database and Search Engine for Direct Democracy

=== By municipality ===
Choice	Votes	%
Yes	52	73.24
No	19	26.76
Total	71	100.00
Valid votes	71	72.45
Invalid/blank votes	27	27.55
Total votes	98	100.00
Registered voters/turnout	98	100.00
Source: Database and Search Engine for Direct Democracy

== Aftermath ==
=== Status ===
Deputy Jacques-François de Menou, Baron of Boussay, gave the joint report of the diplomatic and Avignon committees to the National Assembly on September 12, 1791. Menou proceeded to assert the freedom of these votes, as well as the idea that because it would not seriously injure any foreign countries and because it was probably necessary for avoiding civil war, union ought to be decreed.

Deputies on the right in the National Assembly immediately attacked these results and had the mediators summoned for questioning. The debate carried over into the day, only to be interrupted by news of the king's acceptance of the constitution. On September 14, 1791, Jérôme Pétion de Villeneuve argued that the time had come for a vote. A significant majority of deputies concurred with the mediators' views, and the National Assembly decreed, "In accordance with the wish freely and solemnly proclaimed by the majority of the communities and citizen of the two countries," the union of Avignon and the Comtat with France.

Formal cession of these territories to France occurred in 1797 through the Treaty of Tolentino, with the annexation being officially acknowledged by the Pope on May 30, 1814.

=== Coup and killings ===
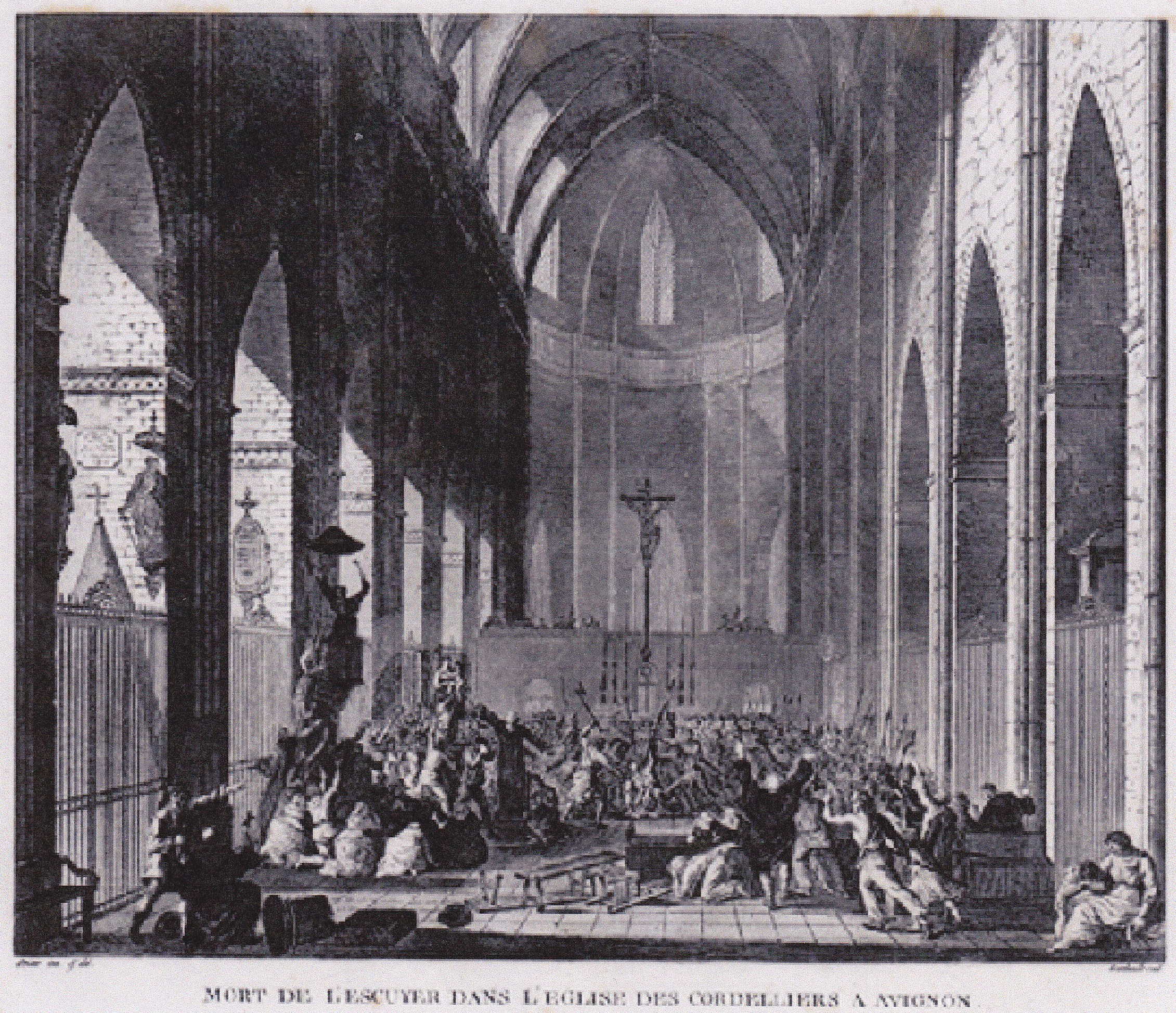
Murder of Lescuyer in the Cordeliers church

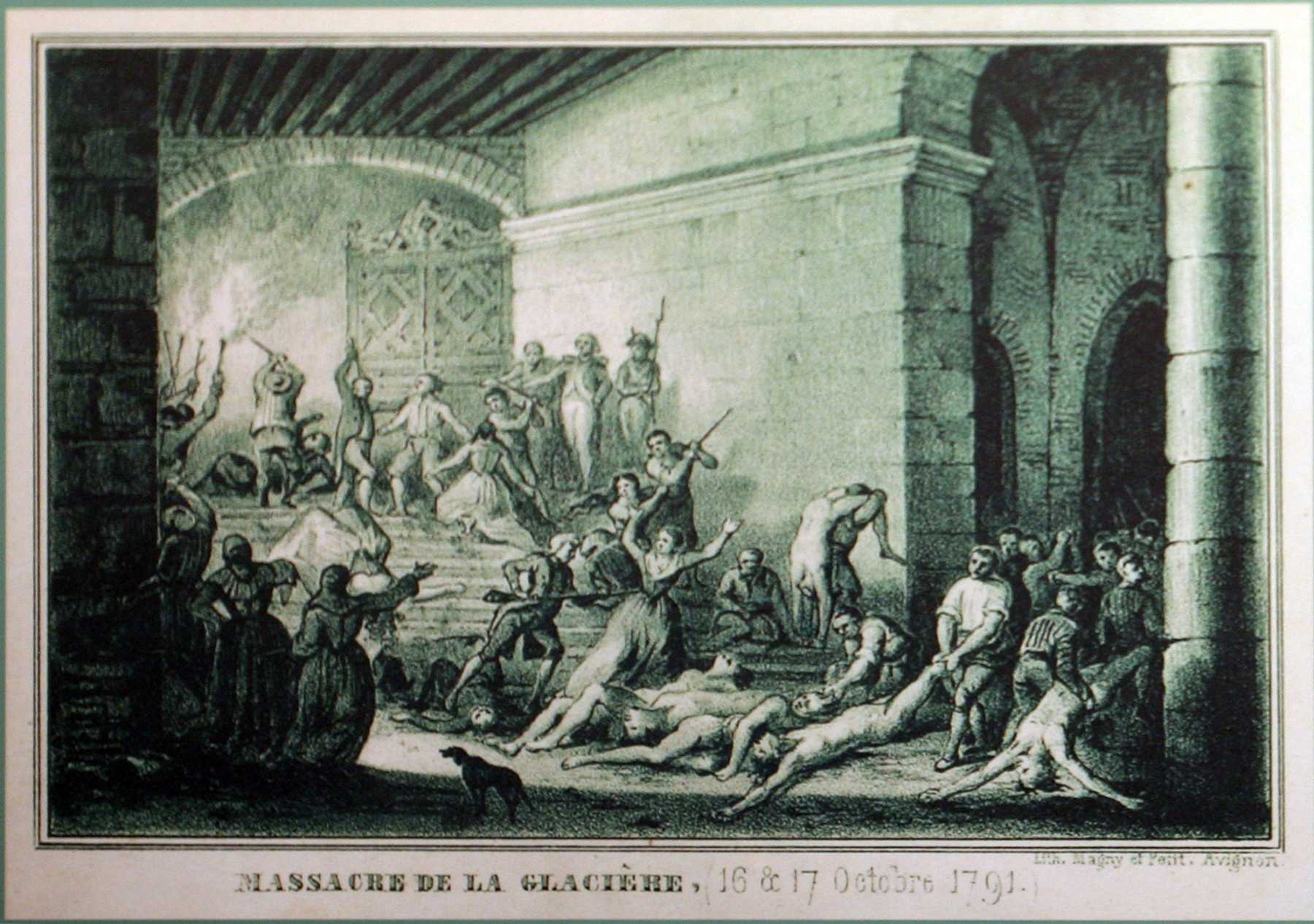
1844 illustration of the Massacres of La Glacière

On 23 August, extremists organised by Jourdan returned to Avignon under Duperat and couped the moderate city council and took control of the Palais des Papes. The moderates resisted and when Lescuyer, one of the leaders of the new extremist government, began to plunder the Mount of piety, a mob of moderates fell upon and killed him. Determined to avenge their leader and to conceal all traces of their crime before the arrival of the government troops which were daily expected, the extremists descended on the city, and, after arresting many of the respectable citizens as "suspects," thrust them into prison and there massacred some of them, killing up to 110 from 16 October to 17 October.

It wasn't until 9 November when government troops entered the city, which during the interval had been at the mercy of Jourdan and his men. Under the protection of the troops the moderate reaction, so long stifled, at once broke out; Jourdan narrowly escaped with his life, and was sent for trial to Paris. 2,000 of the bandits were driven out of Avignon, and the old municipality was reinstated. The question of sending troops to Avignon was much discussed in the Assembly during October; and that body must share with the Ministry the blame of the unpardonable delay in their despatch both before and after the massacres, by which the lives and properties of respectable citizens were placed at the mercy of a gang of murderers.

== Works cited ==
- Kolla, Edward (2017). Sovereignty, International Law, and the French Revolution. Cambridge University Press. ISBN 9781316843826.
- Dalberg-Acton, John; Leathes, Stanley (1904). The Cambridge Modern History. Vol. 1. Cambridge University Press.
- Ballard, Richard (2011). A New Dictionary of the French Revolution. I.B.Tauris. ISBN 9780857720900.
- Santich, Barbara (2023). Eating in Eighteenth-century Provence: The Evolution of a Tradition. Bloomsbury Publishing. ISBN 9781350329966.
- Johnson, Hubert (2014). The Midi in Revolution: A Study of Regional Political Diversity, 1789-1793. ISBN 9781400854363.
- Campbell, Thomas (1843). History of our own Times. Vol. 1. The British Library.
