= Jean Duprat =

Jean Duprat may refer to:

- Jean Duprat (politician, born 1936) (1936–2018), French politician
- Jean Duprat (mayor) (1760–1793), mayor of Avignon
- Jean Étienne Benoît Duprat (1752–1809), French general
