= Francis Huré =

French diplomat and writer (1916–2021)

Francis Huré (5 October 1916 – 4 November 2021) was a French resistant, diplomat and writer.

== Biography ==
Huré was born in Abbeville in October 1916. During the Second World War, he joined Free France and the 2nd Armored Division (France).

He later became ambassador of France in Cameroon (1965–1968), in Israel (1968–1973), then in Belgium (1973–1980), experiences he recalled in the series Martin.

Huré died on 4 November 2021, at the age of 105.

== Works ==
- 1962: Le Consulat du Pacifique, Paris, Robert Laffont, 260 p. BnF 33046953

- Prix Cazes 1963

- 1992: Dans l’Orient désert ou Les Cahiers apocryphes du chevalier d’Onicourt envoyé au Levant, 1789-1793, Paris, Albin Michel, 316 p. ISBN 2-226-05885-0
- 2005: Nous ne faisons que passer, Paris, Éditions de Fallois, 246 p. ISBN 2-87706-562-6
- 2006: Portraits de Pechkoff, Éditions de Fallois, 192 p. ISBN 2-87706-602-9

- Prix Combourg-Chateaubriand 2006
- Prix Marcel Pollitzer 2008

- 2009: Et la peine est toujours là, Éditions de Fallois, 192 p. ISBN 978-2-87706-674-7
- 2010: Martin à Moscou, Éditions de Fallois, 146 p. ISBN 978-2-87706-717-1
- 2010: Martin en Afrique, Éditions de Fallois, 141 p. ISBN 978-2-87706-744-7
- 2011: Martin en Israël, Éditions de Fallois, 154 p. ISBN 978-2-87706-776-8.
- 2014: Martin en dernier lieu, Paris, Éditions de Fallois, 160 p. ISBN 978-2-87706-858-1
