= François Sureau =

French writer, lawyer and technocrat (born 1957)

- Born: François Maurice Christophe Sureau; 19 September 1957 (age 68); Paris, France
- Education: Lycée Saint-Louis-de-Gonzague
- Alma mater: Sciences Po; École nationale d'administration
- Occupations: Lawyer; Writer
- Known for: Member of the Académie Française (2020–present)

François Maurice Christophe Sureau (French pronunciation: [fʁɑ̃swa syʁo]; born 19 September 1957) is a French writer, lawyer and technocrat. In 2020, he was elected to the Académie Française.

== Biography ==
Sureau was born in the 14th arrondissement of Paris. His father was Claude Sureau (1927–2020), a former president of the National Academy of Medicine.

He studied at Sciences Po and the École nationale d'administration (ENA), before joining the Conseil d'État as an auditeur. He is a co-founder and co-director of the French Review of Economics (Revue française d'économie). He is also the founding president of the Association Pierre Claver which assists refugees and displaced persons who have arrived in France. He is also a member of the editorial board of the journal Commentaire.

On 15 October 2020, he was elected a member of the Académie Française (seat 24).

== Awards ==
Sureau has won a number of prizes for his literary works. These include La Corruption du siècle, winner of the Prix Colette and Prix Paul Flat in 1989; L'Infortune, winner of the Grand Prix du roman de l'Académie française in 1990; Le Sphinx de Darwin, winner of the Prix Goncourt de la Nouvelle in 1997; Les Alexandrins which won the Prix Méditerranée in 2003; and Je ne pense plus voyager. La mort de Charles de Foucauld, which win the Prix Combourg-Chateaubriand in 2016.

== Books ==
- Terre inconnue, récit de voyage, 1983
- À l'est du monde, with Gilles Étrillard, 1983
- L'Indépendance à l'épreuve, 1988
- La Corruption du siècle, Prix Colette and Prix Paul Flat, 1988
- Garçon, de quoi écrire, with Jean d'Ormesson, 1989
- L'Infortune, Grand Prix du roman de l'Académie française, 1990
- L'Aile de nos chimères, 1993
- Les hommes n'en sauront rien, 1995
- Le Sphinx de Darwin, Prix Goncourt de la Nouvelle, 1997
- Lambert Pacha, 1998
- Les Alexandrins, Prix Méditerranée, 2003
- La Chanson de Passavant, 2005
- L'Obéissance, 2006
- Inigo. Portrait, 2010
- Sans bruit sans trace, 2011
- Le Chemin des morts, 2013
- Sur les bords de tout, 2016
- Je ne pense plus voyager. La mort de Charles de Foucauld, Prix Combourg-Chateaubriand, 2016
- Pour la liberté. Répondre au terrorisme par la raison, 2017
- L'Or du temps, 2020
- Ma vie avec Apollinaire, 2021
- Un an dans la forêt, 2022
- S'en aller, 2024
- Les enfants perdus, 2025
- Loin de Salonique, 2026

== Honours ==
- Commander of the Legion of Honour (2021)
- Commander of the Ordre des Arts et des Lettres (2020)
- Knight of the Ordre du Mérite Maritime (2008)
