= Lycée Claude-Bernard =

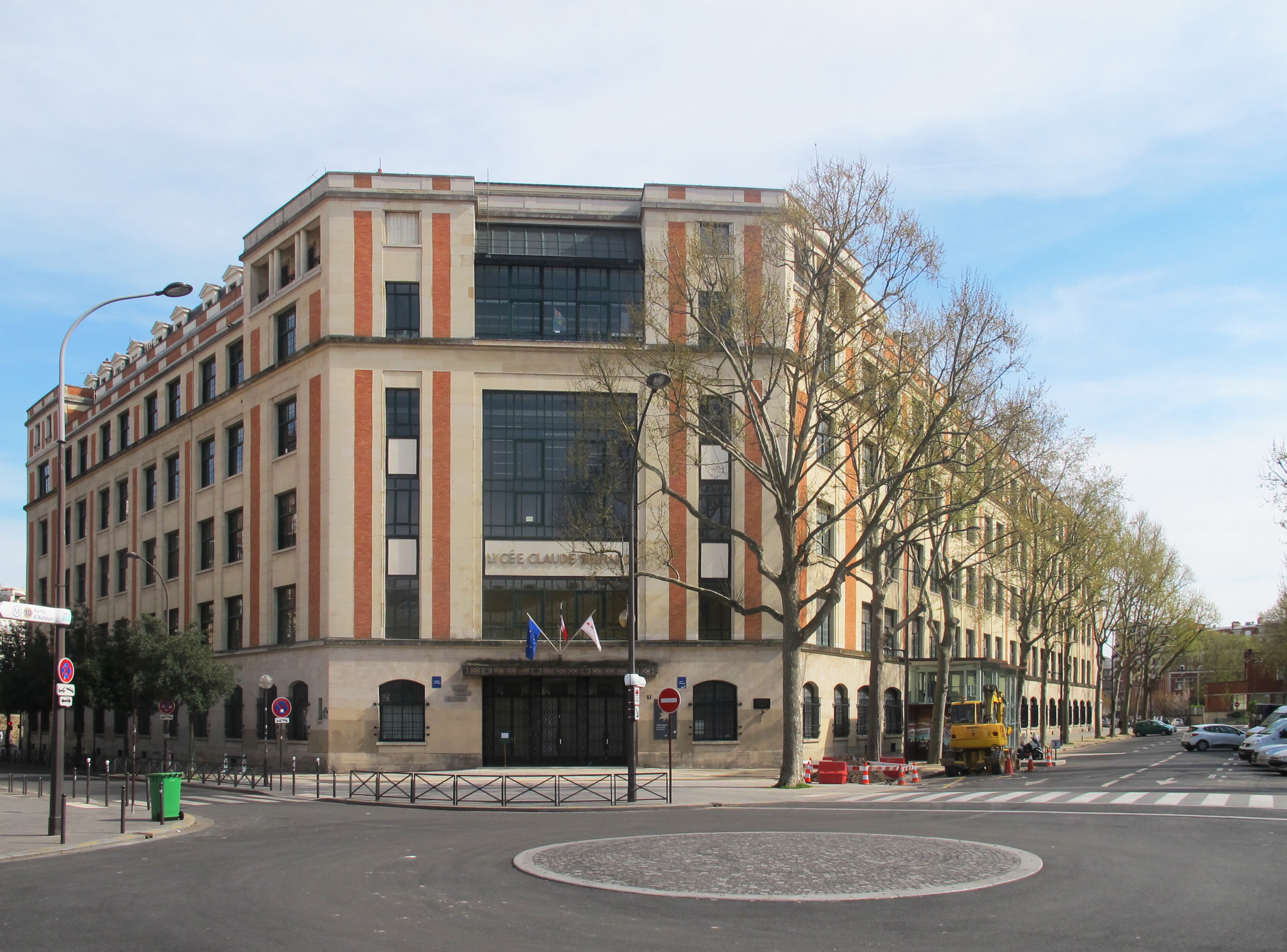
- Façade of the lycée.

Location
- 1 avenue du Parc-des-Princes, Paris; France

Information
- Type: Établissement public local d’enseignement (EPLE)
- Principal: Catherine Manciaux
- Website: ac-paris.fr/serail/jcms/s2_544112/

The lycée Claude-Bernard is a French public school opened in 1938, both a collège and a lycée. It is located at 1, avenue du Parc-des-Princes in Paris, in the 16th arrondissement of Paris, and bears the name of French doctor Claude Bernard (1813–1878).

== History ==
At the beginning of the 1930s, a programme was launched for the south of the 16th arrondissement to build a new lycée for boys, and also a new one for girls (the latter being the Lycée La Fontaine (Paris)). The lycée Claude-Bernard was originally conceived for 1200 students in 50 classes.

Built in 1937 on a large area of open ground, and inaugurated on 16 June 1938 in the presence of Minister of National Education Jean Zay, it was originally intended as a lycée for boys based particularly on literature, sciences and arts.

In Paris in World War II, between 17 June 1940 and 23 August 1944, the lycée was requisitioned and transformed into a barracks for SS troops. The soldiers undertook military exercises in close proximity, in Parc des Princes. A bunker was also built in the basement of the lycée, containing an infirmary; it now serves as the school's archives. The students were transferred to lycée Janson-de-Sailly and the accommodation was used by Germans from April 1942, giving compensation, but also causing theft and damage. After the Liberation of Paris, the lycée was occupied by American soldiers of the 2nd Armored Division (France) led by Philippe Leclerc de Hauteclocque. A commemorative plaque in the hall of the lycée recalls the memory of eight Jewish students deported and another of the 23 students and teachers who gave their lives for France.

In October 1946, an annex to the lycée opened, the pilot school of Enghien-les-Bains, which became the lycée Gustave-Monod and notably taught Lucie Aubrac.

== Architecture ==
=== Location ===
The lycée is situated on grounds surrounded by avenue du Parc-des-Princes, rue Lecomte-Du-Nouÿ, boulevard Murat and rue de l'Arioste.

The site is served by Métro station Porte de Saint-Cloud.

=== General Architecture ===
The architect was Gustave Umbdenstock. The main entrance (in forged iron, created by Maître Bouchard, member of the Institute) is located on the corner of avenue du Parc-des-Princes and rue Lecomte-Du-Nouÿ. It opens onto a round hall (with mural decoration by Maître Ernest Denis, member of the Institute) which allows access to the central recreation courtyard (the buildings run along the road, a central access corridor allows access to the interior courtyard, while students were originally overlooking the courtyard so that they would not be distracted by outside noise on the road or sporting exercises taking place at the stadium of Parc des Princes), the four staircases serving the lycée and administrative buildings. In the courtyard, the door for the hall is overlooked by a wrought iron clock. There is a library, an amphitheatre, two courtyards, and two gymnasiums. The classrooms are on four floors, and offices are on the fifth.

A service entrance can be found on the corner of rue Lecomte-Du-Nouÿ and boulevard Murat and another smaller entrance on rue de l'Arioste.

The frame of the building is made of reinforced concrete. The ground floor is covered in Saint-Maximin stone covered in Bagneux, with steps in Sept-Monts stone and pink bricks and stone courtyard in Boulaye stone. The roof, some floors, and two turrets are made of slate. There is also a covered terrace for the surplus.

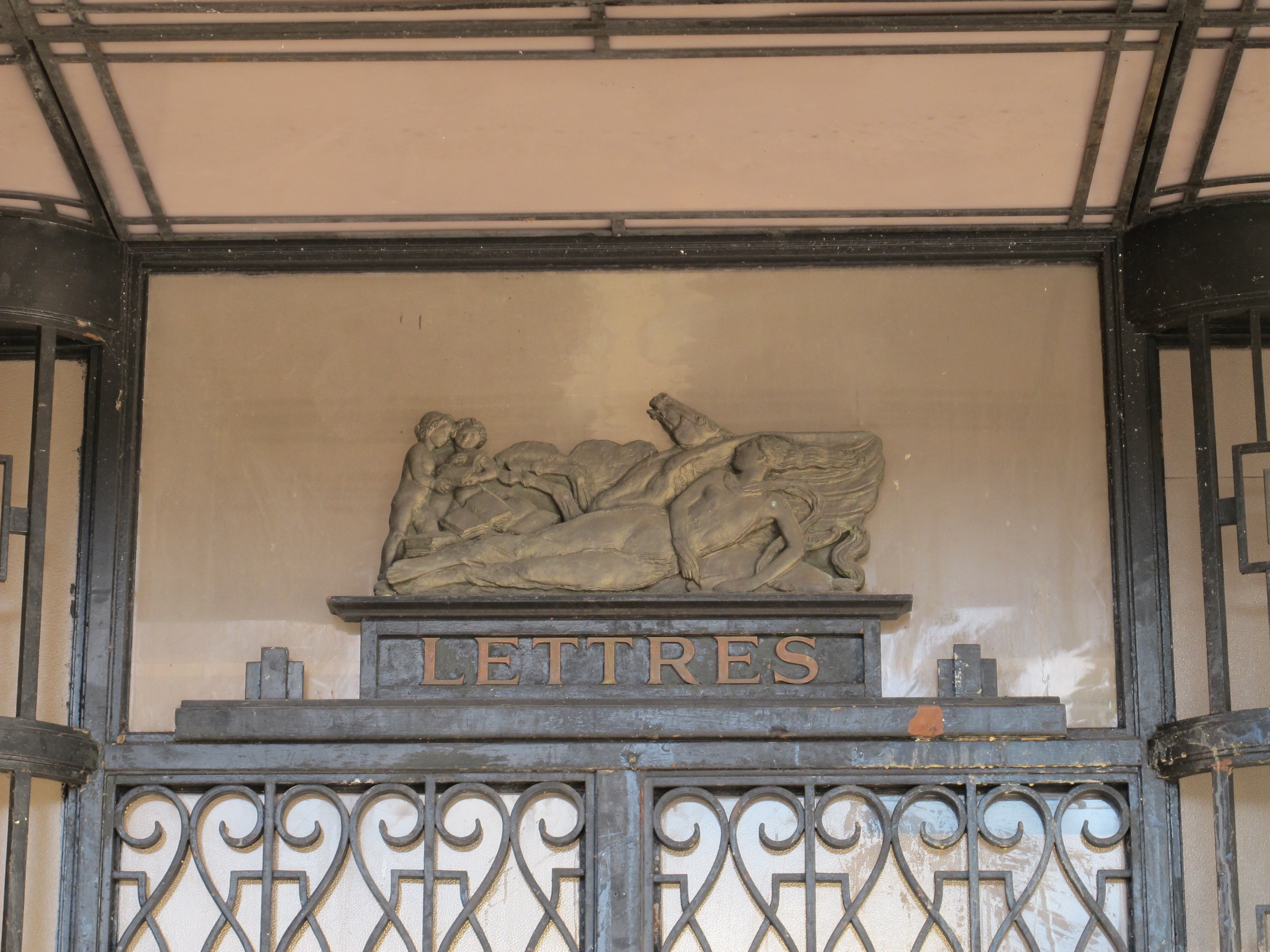
Main door (left).

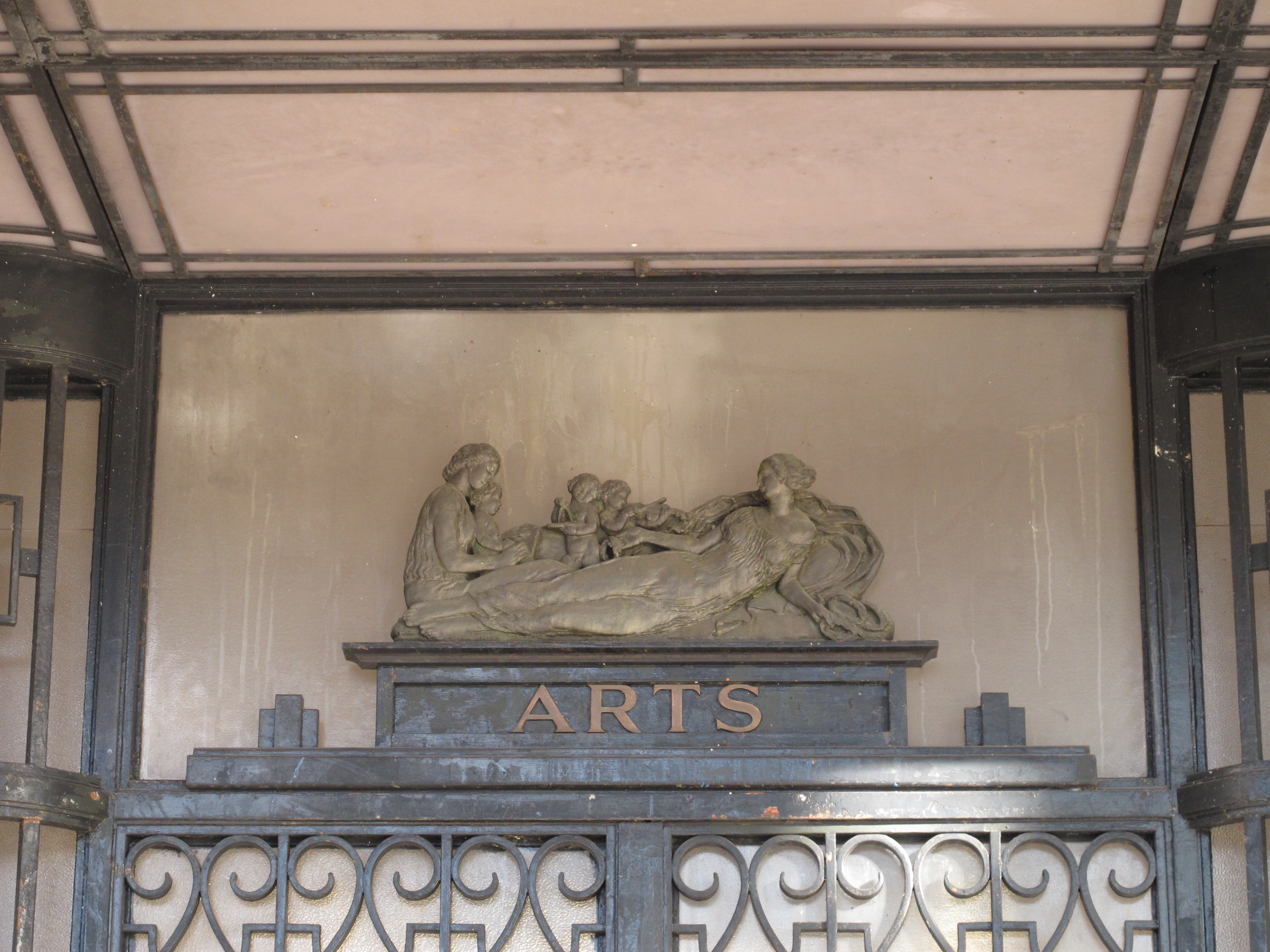
Main door (centre).

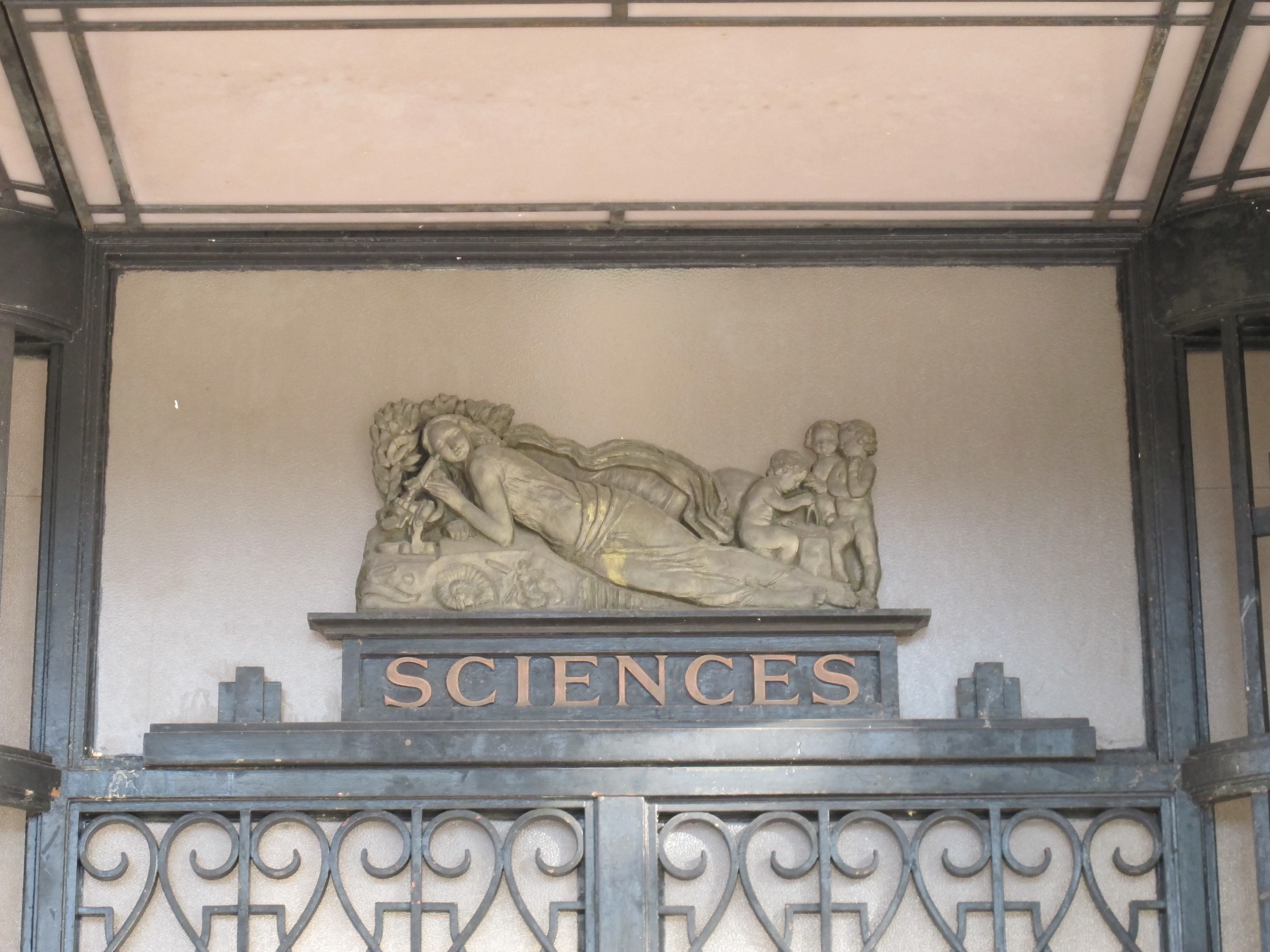
Main door (right).

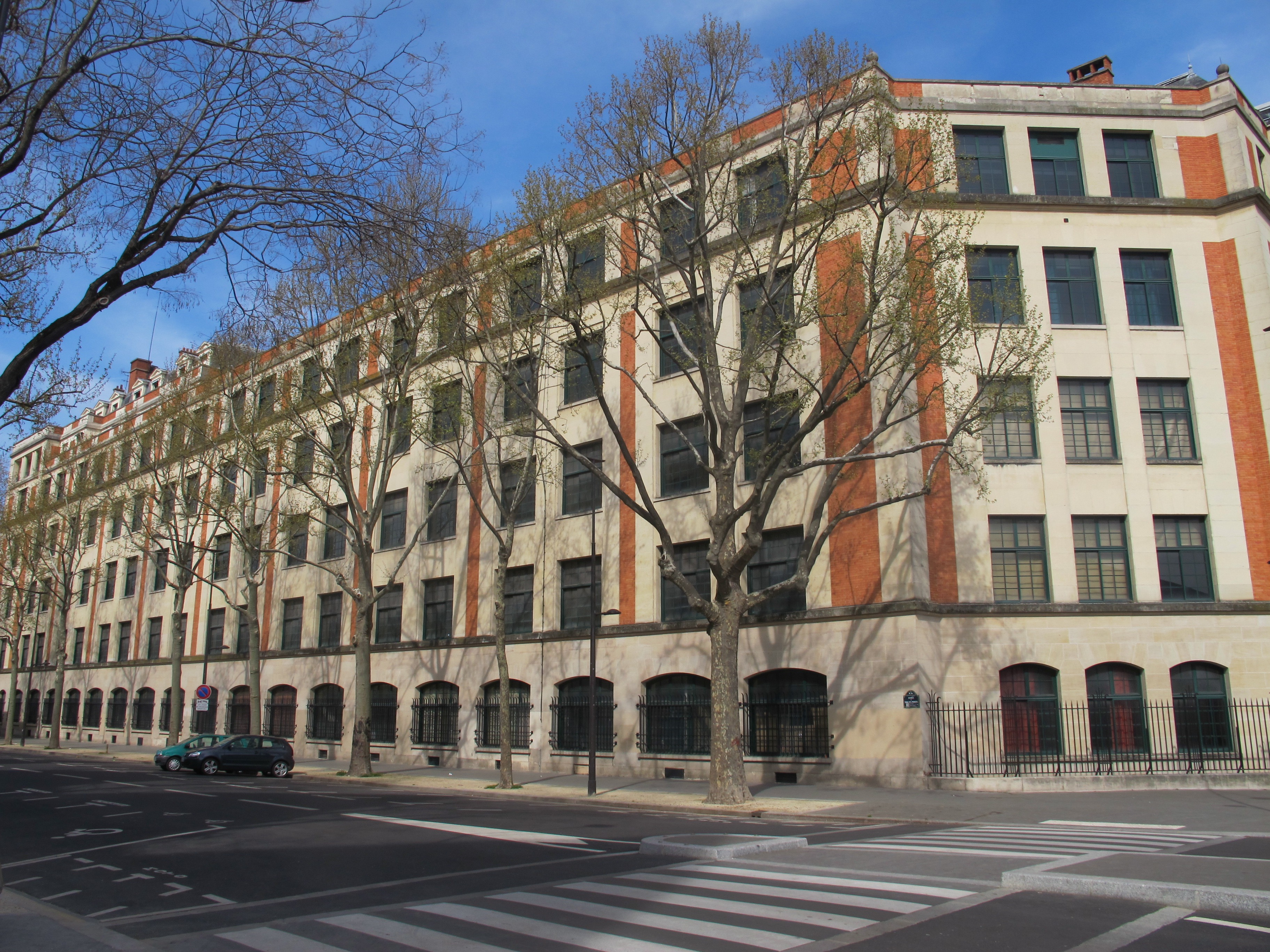
Façade of the lycée

Click on images to enlarge

== Lycée ranking ==
In 2016, the lycée ranked 96th out of 110 at départemental level in terms of teaching quality, and 1738th at national level. The ranking is based on three criteria: the level of bac results, the proportion of students who obtain their baccalauréat having spent their last two years at the establishment, and added value (calculated based on the social origin of the students, their age, and their national diploma results).

== Teaching ==
The lycée formed part of the "Experience of 58 lycées", with a Mitra 15, teaching IT since 1975.

== Student population ==
The establishment has around 1300 students from 6th form to preparatory classes.

== Headteacher of the lycée ==
- 1 February 1941 – unknown date: Camille Perrin
- Before 2016 : Daniel Villevet
- 2016 - 2018 : Catherine Manciaux
- Since 2018 : Martine Ferry-Grand

== Alumni ==
=== Former teachers ===
- Michel Deguy
- Nicolas Grellet (maths)
- Louis Poirier (Julien Gracq) (history-geography, 1947–1970)

=== Former students ===
- François Baroin, politician
- Virginie Calmels, politician
- Éric Civanyan, actor
- François Deguelt, singer
- François Delebecque, photographer
- Sacha Distel, singer
- Michel Field, journalist
- François Gibault, lawyer and writer
- Mark Karpelès, seller of Bitcoin
- Arno Klarsfeld, lawyer
- Pascal Légitimus, actor
- Michel Loirette, writer
- Georges Perec, writer
- Gilles Peress, photographer
- Jean-Christian Petitfils, writer and historian
- Jean-Christophe Rufin, writer
- Paul-Loup Sulitzer, writer
- Jeannot Szwarc, film director
- Paul Wermus, journalist
- Benjamin Voisin, actor
