= Jean Étienne Benoît Duprat =

French general (1752–1809

Jean Étienne Benoît Duprat (French pronunciation: [ʒɑ̃ etjɛn bənwa dypʁa]; 1752–1809) was a French general in Napoleon's army.

He came from Avignon, and was a colonel in the Papal troops before it was united with France in 1791.

His younger brother was Jean Duprat, and they were both implicated in the Massacres of La Glacière.

He was killed at the Battle of Wagram. His name is inscribed in column 19 of the Arc de Triomphe.
