= Duprat =

Duprat is a surname. Notable people with the surname include:

- Chevalier Alfredo Duprat (1810–1881), Portuguese military official
- Antoine Duprat (1463–1535), French chancellor and cardinal
- François Duprat (1940–1978), French essayist and politician
- Gastón Duprat (born 1969), Argentine TV and film director
- Hubert Duprat (born 1957), French artist
- Jean Duprat, various people
- Patrick Duprat, Mayotte politician
- Pierre Louis Alfred Duprat (1866–1953), French colonial governor
- Rogério Duprat (1932–2006), Brazilian composer and musician
