= Prix Marcel Pollitzer =

The Prix Marcel Pollitzer, formally the Prix des écrivains combattants Fondation Marcel Pollitzer, is a French literary award created in 1953 by the Association des écrivains combattants. Named for writer Marcel Pollitzer, it is awarded every year to "a work of history and, preferably, to a biography".

== List of winners ==
Source: Association des écrivains combattants

- 1972 - Claude Michelet
- 1973 - Gabriel de Broglie
- 1974 - Micheline Dupuy
- 1975 - Françoise de Bernardy
- 1976 - Philippe Ragueneau
- 1977 - Roger Glachant
- 1978 - Pierre Levergeois
- 1979 - Bernardine Melchior-Bonnet
- 1980 - Paul Guth
- 1981 - Arnaud d'Antin de Vaillac
- 1982 - Danièle Decure
- 1983 - Marc Audry
- 1984 - Pierre Miquel
- 1985 - Hervé Le Boterf
- 1986 - Christian Pennera
- 1987 - Micheline Dupray
- 1988 - Bernard Pierre
- 1989 - Gaston Palewski
- 1990 - Michel Herubel
- 1991 - Philippe Séguin, Napoléon le Grand (Éditions Grasset)
- 1992 - Arthur Conte
- 1993 - Pierre Pellissier
- 1994 - Jacques Hubert
- 1995 - François Bayrou
- 1996 - Hélie de Saint Marc
- 1997 - Claude Guy, En écoutant de Gaulle (Grasset)
- 1998 - Guillemette de Sairigne, Mon illustre inconnu (Fayard)
- 1999 - Geneviève de Gaulle-Anthonioz, La Traversée de la nuit (Éditions du Seuil)
- 2000 - André Sellier
- 2001 - Geneviève Salkin
- 2002 - François Broche
- 2003 - Jean-Christophe Notin
- 2004 - Philippe Doumenc, Les amants de Tonnegrange (Seuil)
- 2005 - Georges Longeret, Jacques Laurent and Cyril Bondroit, Les combats de la RC4 (Indo Éd.)
- 2006 - Amaury Lorin, Paul Doumer (L'Harmattan)
- 2007 - André Turcat
- 2008 - Francis Huré, Portrait de Pechkoff (Éditions de Fallois)
- 2009 - Dominique Paladhile, Le Grand Condé (Pygmalion)
- 2010 - Charles Zorgbibe, Metternich, le séducteur diplomate (de Fallois)
- 2011 - Henri Bogdan, Les Hohenzollern (Perrin)
- 2012 - Jean Casterède, Louis XIII et Richelieu (France-Empire)
- 2013 - Pierre Milza, Garibaldi (Robert Laffont)
- 2014 - Catherine Decours, Juliette Récamier (Perrin)
- 2015 - Jean-Christian Petitfils, Louis XV (Perrin)

== See also ==
- List of history awards
