= Moyeuvre-Grande =

- Commune
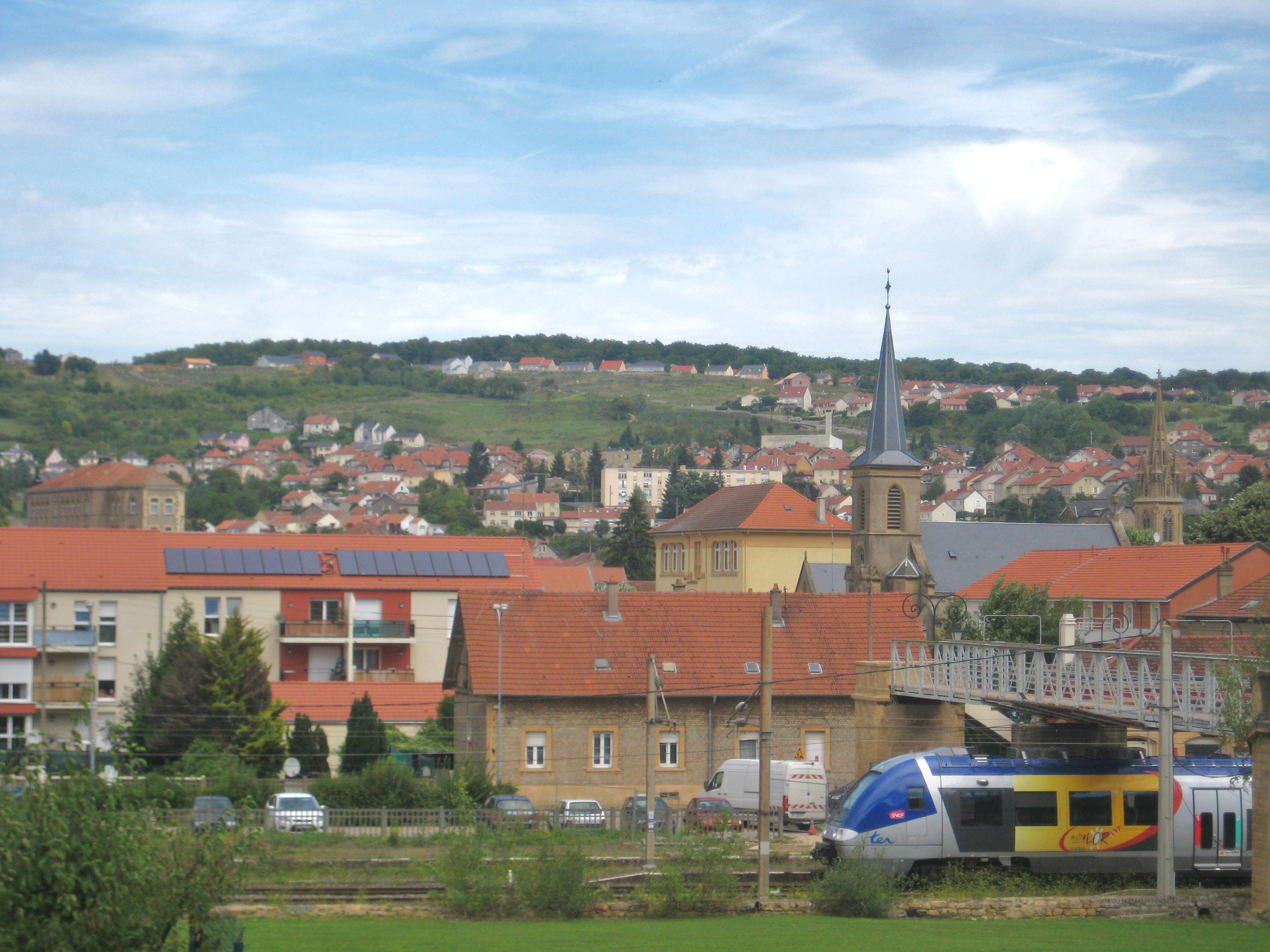
- A general view of Moyeuvre

- Coat of arms
- Location of Moyeuvre-Grande
- Location within France Location within Grand Est
- Coordinates: 49°15′12″N 6°02′47″E
- Country: France
- Region: Grand Est
- Department: Moselle
- Arrondissement: Thionville
- Canton: Hayange
- Intercommunality: CC Pays Orne-Moselle

Government
  - Mayor (2020–2026): Franck Roviero
- Area^{1}: 9.59 km^{2} (3.70 sq mi)
- Elevation: 200 m (660 ft)
- Highest elevation: 330 m (1,080 ft)
- Lowest elevation: 168 m (551 ft)
- Population (2023): 7,311
  - Density: 762/km^{2} (1,970/sq mi)
- Time zone: UTC+01:00 (CET)
  - Summer (DST): UTC+02:00 (CEST)
- INSEE/Postal code: 57491 /57250
- ^{1} French Land Register data, which excludes lakes, ponds, glaciers > 1 km^{2} (0.386 sq mi or 247 acres) and river estuaries.

Moyeuvre-Grande (French pronunciation: [mwajœvʁ ɡʁɑ̃d]; German: Großmövern) is a commune in the Moselle department, Grand Est, northeastern France.

Since 1986 Moyeuvre-Grande has been twinned with Snodland, a town of similar size, located in Kent, England.

== Population ==
Historical population
Year	Pop.	±% p.a.
1968	14,568	—
1975	12,523	−2.14%
1982	10,287	−2.77%
1990	9,203	−1.38%
1999	8,994	−0.25%
2007	8,210	−1.13%
2012	7,973	−0.58%
2017	7,823	−0.38%
2023	7,311	−1.12%
Source: INSEE

== Personalities ==
- Mireille Guiliano, American and French author, born in 1946.
- Hugues Occansey, basketball player
- Jean-Maurice de Montremy, author

== See also ==
- Communes of the Moselle department
