= Marsainvilliers =

- Commune
- Location of Marsainvilliers
- Location within France Location within Centre-Val de Loire
- Coordinates: 48°13′20″N 2°17′07″E
- Country: France
- Region: Centre-Val de Loire
- Department: Loiret
- Arrondissement: Pithiviers
- Canton: Le Malesherbois
- Intercommunality: Pithiverais

Government
  - Mayor (2020–2026): Didier Monceau
- Area^{1}: 10.82 km^{2} (4.18 sq mi)
- Highest elevation: 132 m (433 ft)
- Lowest elevation: 119 m (390 ft)
- Population (2023): 303
  - Density: 28.0/km^{2} (72.5/sq mi)
- Time zone: UTC+01:00 (CET)
  - Summer (DST): UTC+02:00 (CEST)
- INSEE/Postal code: 45198 /45300
- ^{1} French Land Register data, which excludes lakes, ponds, glaciers > 1 km^{2} (0.386 sq mi or 247 acres) and river estuaries.

Marsainvilliers (French pronunciation: [maʁsɛ̃vilje]) is a commune in the Loiret department in north-central France. The poet Micheline Dupray was born in Marsainvilliers in 1929.

The name of inhabitants are Marsainvilloises

== See also ==
- Communes of the Loiret department
