= Christophe Barbier =

French political journalist and columnist (born 1967)

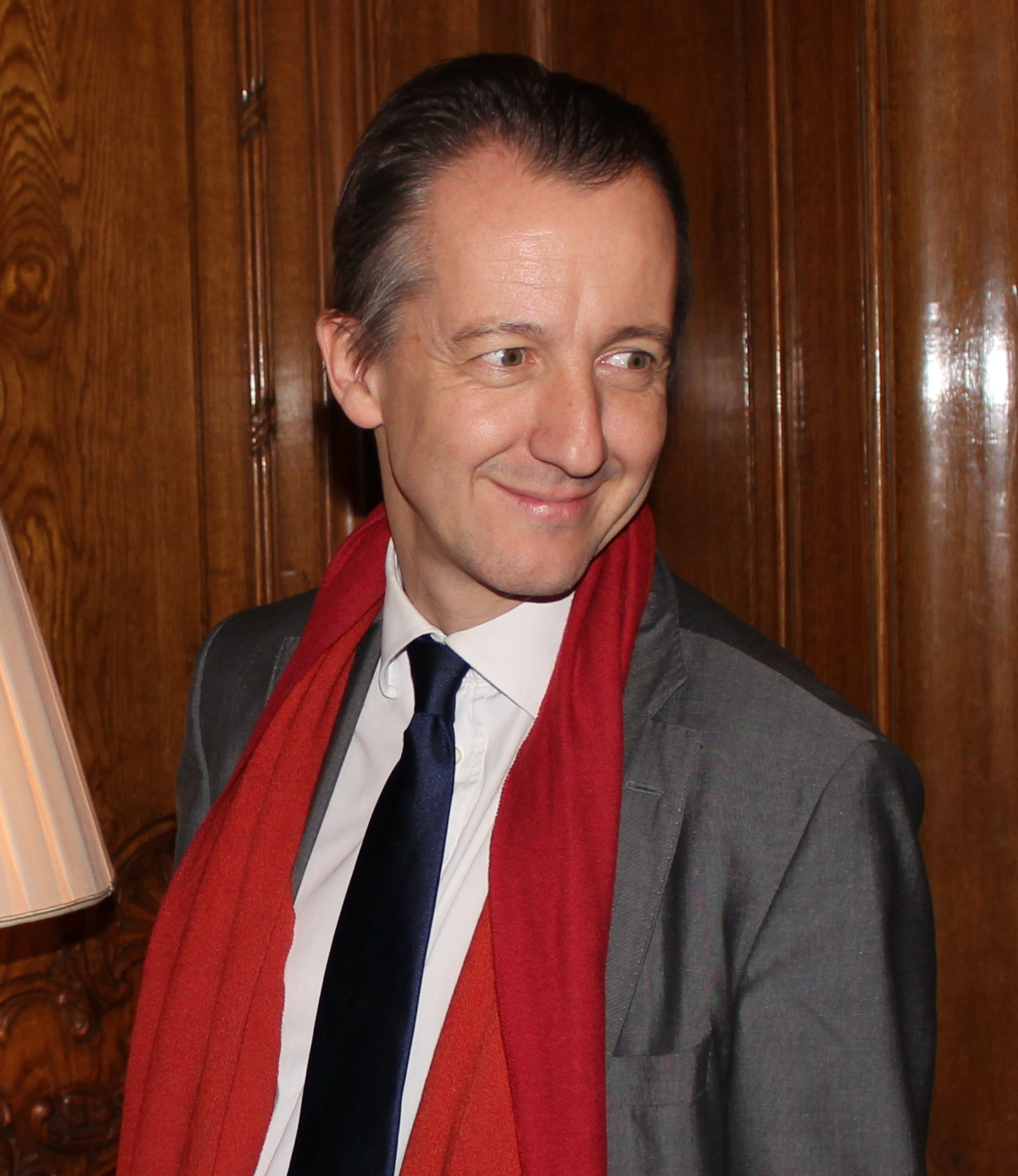
- Barbier in 2015
- Born: 25 January 1967 (age 59); Sallanches, France
- Education: Lycée du Parc
- Alma mater: École normale supérieure ESCP Europe
- Occupation: Journalist
- Employer: BFM TV (current)
- Known for: News columns
- Political party: Independent
- Spouses: Yamini Kumar-Cohen (2008–2019); Pauline Courtin (m. 2020)

Christophe Barbier (French pronunciation: [kʁistɔf baʁbje]; born 25 January 1967) is a French political journalist and columnist who was chief editor of L'Express from 2006 to 2016.

== Career ==
Born in Sallanches, Haute-Savoie, Barbier attended the Lycée du Parc in Lyon. He graduated from the École normale supérieure in 1987 and ESCP Europe in Paris in 1992. He worked for Le Point from 1990 to 1995 and Europe 1 from 1995 until 1996. He was promoted that year head of the political service of L'Express.

He became editorial assistant in 2001 and served as chief editor from 2006 to 2016. During that period he was a frequent guest on LCI and i>Télé, as well as the daily TV show C dans l'air broadcast on France 5. He currently works as a news columnist for BFM TV. His book Les Derniers Jours de François Mitterrand was awarded the 2011 Prix Combourg-Chateaubriand.

== Books ==
- Les Derniers Jours de François Mitterrand, Grasset, 1997 (2015) ISBN 2246513324
- La Comédie des orphelins, Grasset, 2000 ISBN 2246575516
- La guerre de l'Élysée n'aura pas lieu, Grasset, 2001 ISBN 224662441X
- La Saga Sarkozy, Éditions L'Express, 2007 ISBN 978-2843434679
- Le Bleu de la terre, 2007
- Les Nouveaux Caractères, 2007
- Le vrai pouvoir des francs-maçons, by François Koch (préface), Éditions L'Express, 2009
- L'Express. 60 ans à la une, Éditions de la Martinière, 2011
- Les grands entretiens de l'Express (préface), Éditions L'Express, 2011
- Parrains du siècle : destins et déclins, by Bruno Aubry (préface), Éditions L'Express, 2011
- Maquillages. Les politiques sans fard, 2012 ISBN 978-2246794745
- Rêvons !, with Marc Jolivet, Flammarion, 2013
- Dictionnaire amoureux du théâtre, Plon, 2015
- Les derniers jours de la gauche, Flammarion, 2017
