= Prix Combourg-Chateaubriand =

French literary award

- Description: Awarded to a writer for a work of history or literature honoring Chateaubriand's memory
- Location: Château de Combourg, France
- Presented by: Académie Chateaubriand
- Website: www.chateau-combourg.com

The Prix Combourg-Chateaubriand is a French literary award created in 1998 by Hervé Louboutin and Sonia de La Tour du Pin. It is awarded by the Académie Chateaubriand, under the presidency of Philippe de Saint Robert since 1999, in memory of the writer François-René de Chateaubriand. The award ceremony takes place at the Château de Combourg in Ille-et-Vilaine, where Chateaubriand lived during a part of his youth.

== Laureates ==
- 1998: Philippe de Saint Robert for Le Secret des jours
- 1999: Philippe Barthelet for Saint Bernard
- 2000: Gérard Leclerc for L'Amour en morceaux ?
- 2001: Jean d'Ormesson for Voyez comme on danse
- 2003: Régis Debray for God: An Itinerary (Dieu : un itinéraire)
- 2004: Marc Fumaroli for Chateaubriand, poésie et terreur
- 2005: Jean-Christian Petitfils for Louis XVI
- 2006: Francis Huré for Portraits de Pechkoff
- 2007: Jean-Maurice de Montremy for Rancé, le soleil noir
- 2008: Jean Raspail for his entire oeuvre
- 2009: Michel David-Weill for L'esprit en fête
- 2010: Marguerite Castillon du Perron for Montalembert et l'Europe de son temps
- 2011: Christophe Barbier for Les Derniers Jours de François Mitterrand
- 2012: Reynald Secher for A French Genocide: The Vendée (Le Génocide franco-français : La Vendée-Vengé)
- 2013: Jean-Marie Rouart for Napoléon ou la Destinée
- 2014: Alain Finkielkraut for L'Identité malheureuse
- 2015: Éric Zemmour for The French Suicide (Le Suicide français)
- 2016: François Sureau for Je ne pense plus voyager
- 2017: Emmanuel de Waresquiel for Juger la Reine
- 2018: Philippe de Villiers for Le Puy du Fou : un rêve d'enfance
- 2019: Michel de Grèce for Avec ou sans couronne
- 2022: Lætitia De Witt for L’Aiglon. Le rêve brisé de Napoléon.
- 2023: Emmanuel Godo for Maurice Barrès : le grand inconnu.
- 2024: Sylvain Tesson for Avec les fées.
- 2025: Christophe Dickès for Pour l'Église : Ce que le monde lui doit.

== Controversy ==
The Departmental Council of Ille-et-Vilaine sponsors the award with 600 euros annually. When the prize went to essayist Éric Zemmour in 2015, the local Socialist Party leader, Jean-Luc Chenut, protested against the jury's decision and blocked the transaction. Sonia de La Tour du Pin, co-founder of the prize, dismissed Chenut's reaction as "sectarian".
