= André Turcat =

French military and test pilot (1921–2016)

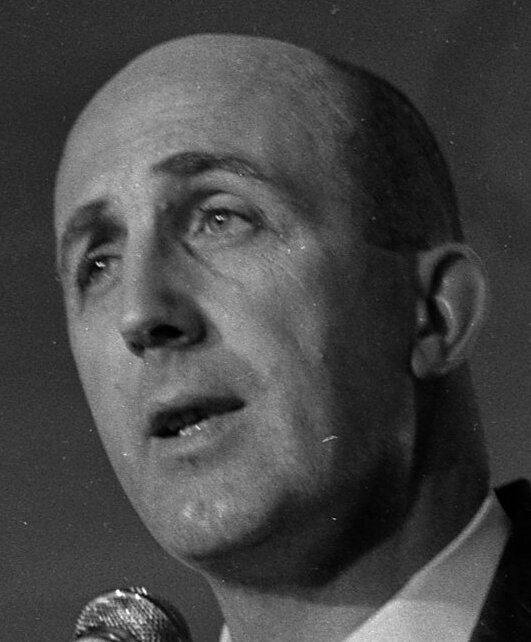
- Born: André Édouard Marcel Turcat; 23 October 1921; Marseille
- Died: 4 January 2016; Beaurecueil
- Education: École polytechnique
- Occupations: Politician, aircraft pilot, test pilot
- Awards: Grand Officer of the Legion of Honour (2005); Grand Cross of the National Order of Merit (1996); Commander of the Order of the British Empire (1952); Prix Marcel Pollitzer (2007)

Major André Édouard Marcel Turcat (French pronunciation: [ɑ̃dʁe tyʁka]; 23 October 1921 – 4 January 2016) was a French Air Force pilot and test pilot celebrated for flying the first prototype of Concorde for its 1969 maiden flight.

Turcat was born in Marseille into a family in the automotive industry. He studied at École polytechnique. In 1983 he founded the Académie nationale de l'air et de l'espace.

Between 1980 and 1981, he served as a Member of the European Parliament for the RPR, a Gaullist party.

== Biography ==
After graduating from École Polytechnique in 1942, Turcat joined the Free French Air Forces during the final years of World War II and stayed with Armée de l'Air after the war. During the Indochina War, Turcat served as a pilot of C-47 transport aircraft and demonstrated exceptional skills in handling a number of flight emergencies, thus earning an assignment to EPNER, France's test pilot school.

Shortly after graduating, Turcat took over the test campaign of the Nord 1500 Griffon, one of the world's first ramjet-powered aircraft. During this successful program, Turcat flew the Griffon at Mach 2.19, a feat that earned him the prestigious Harmon Trophy in 1958. A few months later, 25 February 1959, Turcat broke the world speed record over 100 kilometers with the Griffon, at an average 1,643 km/h (1,021 mph).

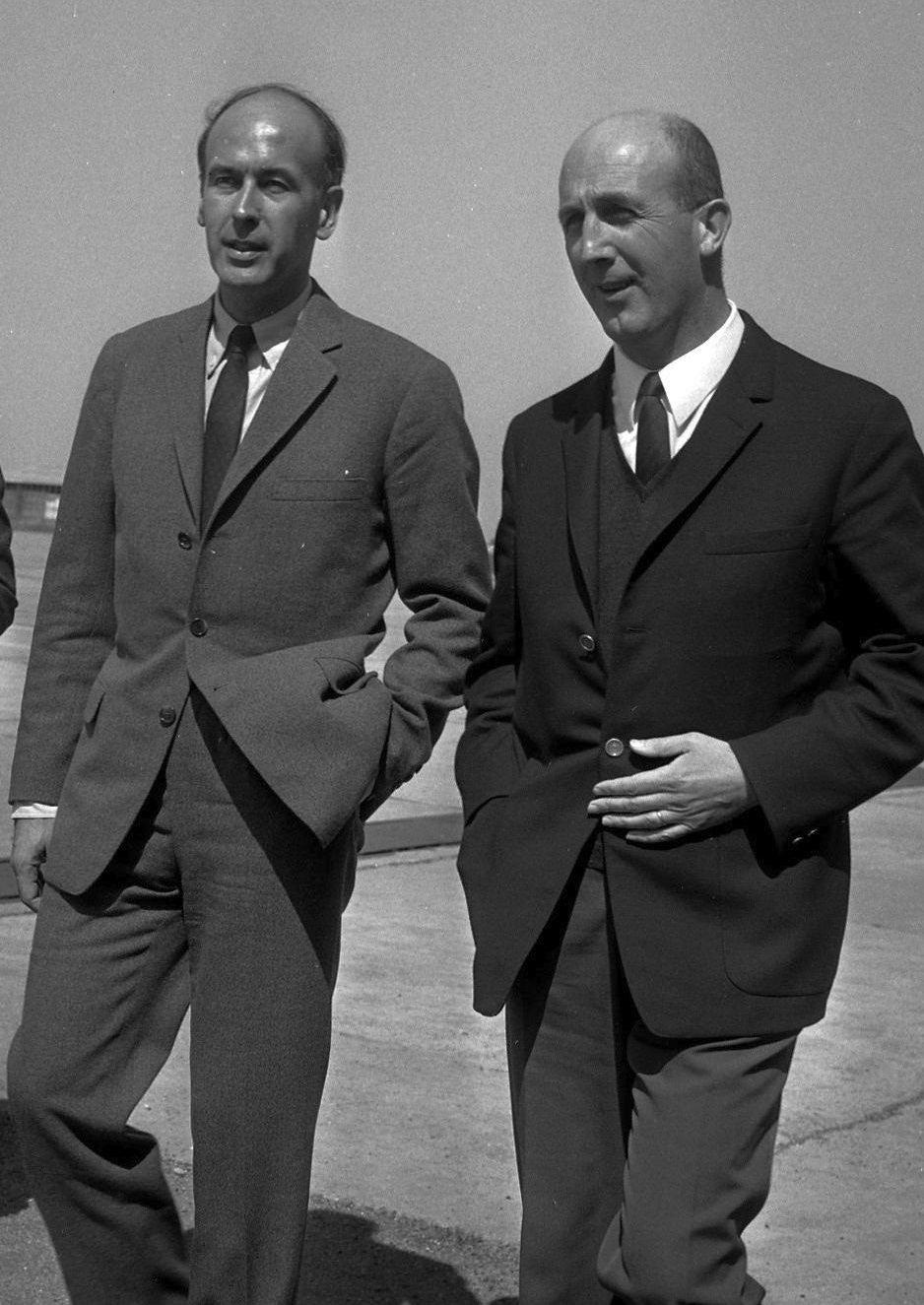
André Turcat alongside Valéry Giscard d'Estaing, also known as VGE, on May 20, 1969, just weeks after Concorde's maiden flight, during the presidential election.

Turcat left the military after the Griffon program ended and joined state-owned aircraft manufacturer Sud Aviation as the Concorde supersonic transport (SST) program was starting. He became Concorde's chief test pilot and Sud Aviation's director of flight testing. On 2 March 1969, Turcat had the honour of flying the first prototype of Concorde for its maiden flight. Later that year (1 October), he was also at the controls for Concorde's first supersonic flight. In 1973, he piloted Concorde 001 as it experienced a total solar eclipse for 74 minutes. Turcat conducted the rest of the French side of the Concorde test program. Brian Trubshaw was the chief test pilot on the British side. He retired from active flying duty in the late 1970s. Both Turcat and Trubshaw were awarded the Ivan C. Kincheloe Award for their work on the Concorde test programme.

He was the founder and first president for the Académie nationale de l'air et de l'espace (ANAE) in 1983. The Academy is known as Académie de l'Air et de l'Espace since 2007. He was present on board the Air France Concorde (F-BVFC) during its retirement flight, on 27 June 2003, to the Airbus plant at Toulouse, where the French aircraft was built . He was an author and wrote several books. Among the latest are Concorde essais et batailles (1977) and Pilote d'essais: Mémoires (2005).

In 1998, Turcat was inducted into the International Air & Space Hall of Fame at the San Diego Air & Space Museum.

== Honours and awards ==
- Grand-Officier of the Order of Legion of Honour
- Grand-Croix of the Ordre National du Mérite
- Croix de Guerre des théâtres d'opérations extérieures
- Aeronautical Medal
- Order of the British Empire
