= Jean-Maurice de Montremy =

French journalist, writer and literary critic

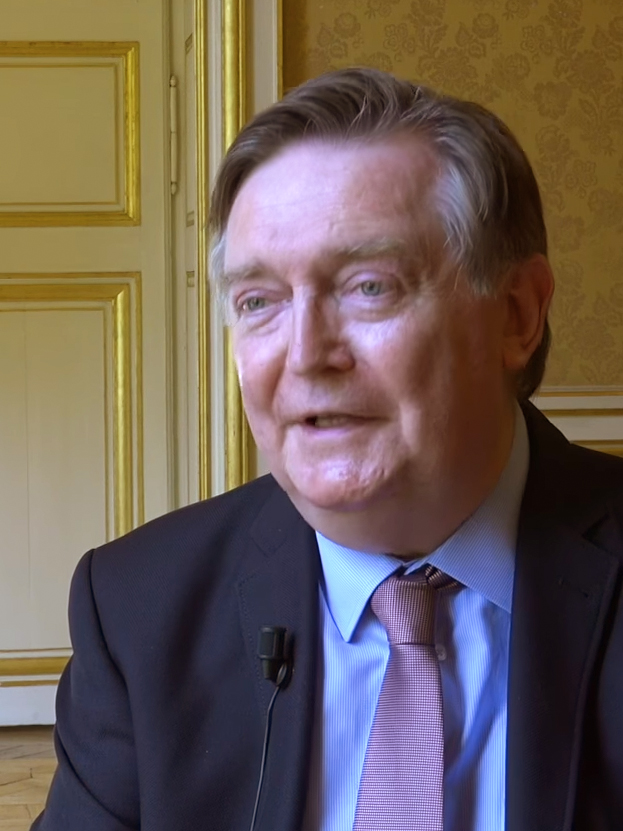
Jean-Maurice de Montremy (2018)

Jean-Maurice Montremy (born 26 July 1952) is a French journalist, writer and literary critic. He was born in Moyeuvre-Grande in the Moselle region. He is the author of several works, including Rancé, le soleil noir on the life of Armand Jean le Bouthillier de Rancé, the founder of the Trappist Cistercians. This work won the Prix Combourg de l'Académie Chateaubriand in 2007.

Montremy has also published novels, including Bilkis (2005) and Miroir et songes (2007). These are part of a cycle of seven novels called Les Îles étrangères of which four have appeared so far. He is a literary critic for the newspapers La Croix and Livre Hebdo.
