= Jean-Christian Petitfils =

French banker, writer, political scientist and historian

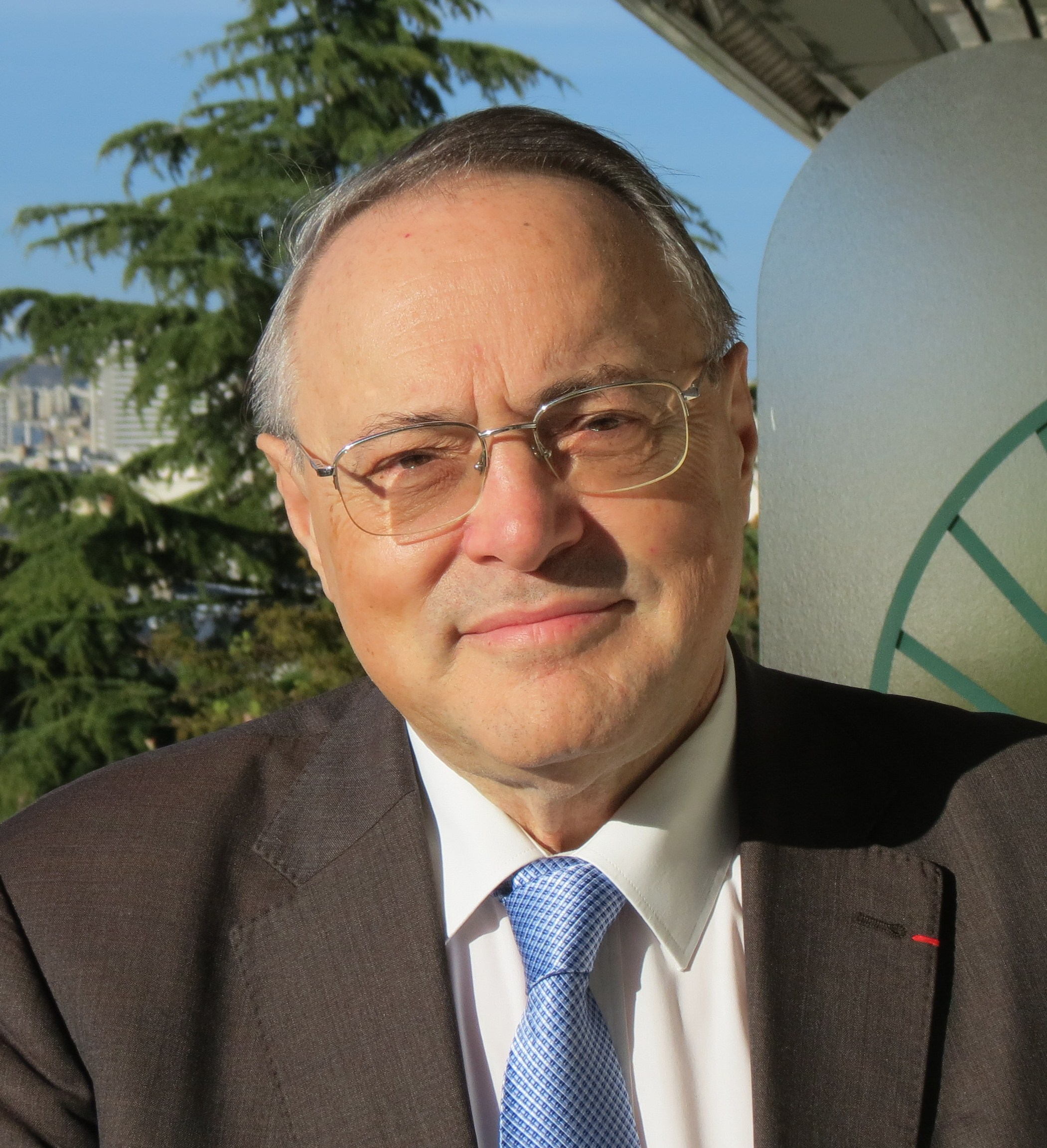
- Jean-Christian Petitfils en 2012.
- Born: 25 December 1944
- Occupations: Political scientist, historian
- Awards: Hugues-Capet Prize (1995); Knight of the National Order of Merit (1996); Prix Marcel Pollitzer (2015); Biography award of the Académie française (1996); Prix Feydeau de Brou (1982); Grand prix de la Critique littéraire (2012)

Jean-Christian Petitfils, born in Paris on December 25, 1944, is a French writer, historian and political scientist, as well as a banker until 2004.

== Early life and education ==
Jean-Christian Petitfils was the son of Pierre Petitfils (1908-2001), a literary critic and author specializing in Rimbaud and Verlaine. He studied at the Lycée Claude-Bernard, the Paris Faculty of Law, the Paris Institute of Political Studies (PES section, class of 1967) and the Sorbonne; he holds degrees in public law and history-geography, a doctorate in political science (1971) and a diploma from the IAE Paris Sorbonne Business School.

== Business career ==
He spent most of his career in the private sector, first as an attorney-at-law (1977), then assistant manager (1983), then deputy manager (1990) at the Bank of Suez and the Union of Mines, which became Banque Indosuez, and later Crédit Agricole Indosuez. He became the executive director at Calyon Corporate and Investment Banking (2004), where he headed the Legal Structuring of Financial Transactions Department, and general secretary of the Groupement pour la Modernisation de la Distribution (1976-1991). He retired in 2004.

== Writing career ==
Petitfils also pursued a career as a historian and writer. After several essays and books on history and political science (La Droite en France, L'Extrême-Droite en France, Le Gaullisme, Les Socialismes utopiques) and biographies of Grand Siècle figures (Le Véritable d'Artagnan, Le Régent, Lauzun, Nicolas Fouquet, Madame de Montespan, Louise de La Vallière), Petitfils wrote a comprehensive work on Louis XIV, the fruit of twenty-five years work (1995).

The latter work combines political science of the Ancien Régime and classical biography, with particular emphasis on the mechanisms of loyalties, clans and clienteles, essential in a political system in the process of being nationalized. The book was a great success (55,000 copies). In the same vein, he continued with biographies of Louis XVI (70,000 copies), Louis XIII, Louis XV and, most recently, Henri IV. He is also interested in the historical figure of Jesus.

Overall, he is the author of over thirty historical works, essays and biographies, including, in addition to those mentioned above, on subjects such as: the Man in the Iron Mask, the Affair of the Poisons, and the assassination of Henry IV.

He is, or has been, a contributor to the newspapers and magazines: Historia, L'Histoire, Marianne, Le Figaro littéraire[fr], Le Figaro Magazine, Le Figaro - Histoire, and Le Point.

He was nominated for René Girard's seat at the Académie française on March 23, 2017.

=== Reception ===
==== On works relating to the Ancien Régime ====
Historian Fabrice d'Almeida considers Jean-Christian Petitfils, a former banker, to be representative of a recent tendency of certain non-historian writers to appropriate the style of professional history, thus blurring the boundaries between “amateur history” and academic history: “Through the dissemination of historical culture and historiographical techniques, actors working outside the field of professional academic history have appropriated the codes of grand history to stage a re-enchantment”. In the case of Petitfils in particular, it is the sheer volume of documents used that serves as a “selling point”

Historian Jean-Baptiste Noé, “Jean-Christian Petitfils writes with great style, which makes his books always enjoyable to read.” These writing qualities are also praised by the journal Hérodote. For far-right activist Dominique Venner in La Nouvelle Revue d'histoire, Petitfils is the “author of talented and authoritative studies, notably a Louis XIV and a very enlightening Louis XVI.” A similar assessment comes from legal historian Jacques de Saint Victor[fr], who considers that “for more than thirty years, he has written tirelessly and, through perseverance, has built up a colossal body of work that many professional academics can legitimately envy.”

His work on the Regent is presented by Claude Lebédel as “a true history of the Regency.”

His Louis XVI (2005) was praised by historian Emmanuel de Waresquiel[fr], who described it as “an intelligent and lucid portrait of the decapitated king” and, in his opinion, Petitfils' best biography. For Marc Riglet of L'Express, Jean-Christian Petitfils has written a remarkable biography that is “far from conventional wisdom”. On the other hand, the book received a very mixed reception from some historians close to the Marxist conception of the Revolution, in the workshop of the Centre de recherches historiques: for Aurore Chéry, "supposed to be an innovative study, Petitfils' biography is more accurately a version of Girault de Coursac's work, improved by time and a trip across the Channel. The major difference, however, is that Petitfils, like Hardman, takes a much less virulent tone and treats Marie Antoinette with greater indulgence." The book is in line with the historical analyses of François Furet, of whom Jean-Christian Petitfils is a disciple.

Nathalie Brémand, in her Introduction: “Utopian socialists,” the misnamed criticizes Petitfils' book on utopian communities in the 19th century, a 2011 reissue of a work first published in 1982. According to her, "there are many negative prejudices associated with the concept of utopian socialism. A selection of these can be found in Jean-Christian Petitfils' book. "The book conveys “a completely outdated image” of “utopian socialism.”

==== On his book Jesus ====
Petitfils writings on Jesus, while well received, received much criticism for a variety of reasons:

- For Jesuit exegete Marc Rastoin[fr], “Petitfils delivers the fruit of serious research (nearly 150 pages of notes). One could say that this is a French version of John Paul Meier's investigation in a single volume, but “at times he attaches too much certainty to hypotheses that are more or less probable”, his textual analysis of the Gospel pericopes is “too literalist, and his concern to support the historicity in the documentary sense of all the Gospel episodes (with a strong preference for John) weakens his conclusions.” Other critics accuse him of “conservatism” because he distances himself from the historical-critical method. French historian and exegete André Paul believes that while his Jesus may appeal for its clarity and ease, it is “unprecedentedly conservative”. He criticizes several of his hypotheses.
- Abbot Denis Puga, of the Society of Saint Pius X, accuses him of “modernism”, particularly because “he constantly casts doubt on the reality of the events recounted in the Gospels of Matthew, Mark, and Luke”.
- Conversely, for Jean Mercier, deputy editor-in-chief of the weekly magazine La Vie, “this book offers a change from exegetes who are sometimes so refined that they lose us in a fog of doubt. It should be read bearing in mind that the historian limits himself to hypotheses, without claiming to have grasped the truth about Christ”.
- For Father Laurent-Marie Pocquet of Haut-Jussé, “Jean-Christian Petitfils's masterpiece is an impressive testimony to an understanding of historical truth that enlightens believers and all people of good will”.
- For essayist Gérard Leclerc, “Jean-Christian Petitfils' book on Jesus seems absolutely indispensable. Reading his voluminous work shows that he had all the qualities necessary for such an undertaking, for it is truly exceptional, especially when compared to all the essays of the same kind published in recent decades. What sets it apart is not only the breadth of its exploration and the precision of its approach to the most thorny subjects, but also the certainty of its judgments, which, after lengthy deliberation, are based on informed judgment”.
- For the Bulletin des Lettres, “Jean-Christian Petitfils is a historian and a rigorous one at that. (...) This alliance, faith and intellect, gives a force of coherence and conviction to this work, which does a lot of good after so many spiteful readings”.

==== John the Evangelist and John the Apostle ====
Jean-Christian Petitfils takes up the historian's hypothesis that denies the apostle John, son of Zebedee, authorship of the fourth gospel. Following many other authors (Oscar Cullmann, François Le Quéré, Joseph A. Grassi, James H. Charlesworth, Xavier Léon-Dufour, among others), he supports the theory of another “John.”

According to Jean-Christian Petitfils, John belonged to the priestly aristocracy of the Temple of Jerusalem. In this work, these historical facts are attributed not to the apostle John, son of Zebedee, but to another John, a “priest” of the Temple priesthood (a function that disappeared in 70 AD with the destruction of the Temple and the capture of Jerusalem by the Roman armies of Titus). Papias, bishop of Hierapolis at the beginning of the second century, spoke of two Johns: John the Apostle and John the Presbyter, disciple of the Lord. Benedict XVI writes in his Jesus of Nazareth that he can “adhere with conviction” to the conclusions of biblical scholars Peter Stuhlmacher, Eugen Ruckstuhl, and Peter Dschullnig, for whom John the Presbyter recorded in his gospel the memories of John, son of Zebedee. This priest would be considered his representative and spokesperson. For Jean-Christian Petitfils, the confusion between the two Johns dates back to the 3rd century.

He considers it unlikely that a humble fisherman's son like John, son of Zebedee, could have had the intellectual capacity to write the Apocalypse and the fourth gospel.

Jean-Christian Petitfils notes that the fourth gospel is largely focused on Jerusalem. John knows the Temple and its staff perfectly. Finally, and most importantly, the fourth gospel makes no mention of one of the major events that John of Zebedee is said to have witnessed with his brother James: the Transfiguration.

== Awards and honours ==
=== Literary awards ===
- 1982: The Feydeau-de-Brou Prize from the Académie Française (history prize) for his book, Le véritable d’Artagnan [The Real d’Artagnan].
- 1995–1996: The Académie Française’s Biography Prize, the Hugues-Capet Prize, and the Maurice Travers Prize from the Académie des Sciences Norales et Politiques for his book Louis XIV.
- 2005–2006: Combourg-Chateaubriand Prize, Nouveau Cercle de l’Union Prize, and Charles-Aubert Prize for History from the Académie des Sciences Morales et Politiques for his book Louis XVI (as well as for his entire body of work).
- 2007: Brantôme Literary Prize for his novel, La Transparence de l'aube, Mémoires de Claire-Clémence, princesse de Condé [The Transparency of Dawn: Memoirs of Claire-Clémence, Princess of Condé].
- 2008–2009: Hossegor Biography Prize, Grand Prix du Livre d’Histoire [Grand Prize for History Books] for his book, Louis XIII.
- 2013: Grand Prize from the French PEN Critics Club for his book, Le Frémissement de la grâce [The Trembling of Grace].
- 2014: Marcel-Pollitzer Prize for his book, Louis XV.
- 2016: Spiritualités d’aujourd’hui [Spiritualities of Today] Prize for his book, Dictionnaire amoureux de Jésus [The Lover's Dictionary of Jesus].

=== Decorations ===
- Order of the Legion of Honour
- Order of Merit (nomination on May 15, 2025)
  - Knight, July 19th, 1996
- Order of Arts and Letters
