= Micheline Dupray =

French poet (1927–2019)

Micheline Andree Dupray (née Legros, 12 March 1927 – 17 May 2019) was a French poet.

Dupray was born in Marsainvilliers, Loiret on 12 March 1927, and died in Paris on 17 May 2019, at the age of 92.

== Works ==
Poetry

- 1975: Merci la vie, dessins de Jacqueline et Marie-Thérèse Rault, M. Dupray
- 1975: « Mes yeux d'immensité » in Les Beaux poèmes contemporains. 5, Éditions Arts et littérature carolorégiens
- 1977: Herzégovine, Formes et languages, Prix Claire Virenque of the Académie française
- 1980: Trains amers, Éditions Saint-Germain-des-Prés,ISBN 2-243-01342-8
- 2002: Souffrir ne suffit pas : une anthologie de poèmes, preface by Ratimir Pavlovic, Association internationale des traducteurs littéraires de langue française, ISBN 2-911193-06-7

Essays

- 1986: Roland Dorgelès, Presses de la Renaissance, ISBN 2-85616-383-1, Prix Marcel Pollitzer of the Académie française 1987
- 2000: Roland Dorgelès. Un siècle de vie littéraire française, Albin Michel, ISBN 978-2226116789

Préface

- 2003: Roland Dorgelès, Je t'écris de la tranchée : correspondance de guerre, 1914-1917, Albin Michel, ISBN 2-226-14187-1
