= Jordan Dupray =

Malagasy international footballer (born 1991)

Personal information
- Date of birth: 13 March 1991 (age 35)
- Place of birth: Le Havre, France
- Height: 1.92 m (6 ft 3 1/2 in)
- Position: Centre back

Team information
- Current team: Lège Cap Ferret

Senior career*
Years	Team	Apps	(Gls)
2008–2011	Le Havre B	20	(1)
2011–2012	Wasquehal		
2013–2015	Grande-Synthe		
2015–	Lège Cap Ferret		

International career^{‡}
2014	Madagascar	2	(0)
- * Club domestic league appearances and goals as of 09:46, 12 December 2015 (UTC) ‡ National team caps and goals as of 09:46, 12 December 2015 (UTC)

Jordan Dupray (born 13 March 1991) is a footballer who plays for French club Consolat Marseille as a centre back. Born in France, he represented the Madagascar national team.

== Career ==
Born in Le Havre, Dupray has played for Le Havre B, Wasquehal, Grande-Synthe and Lège Cap Ferret.

He made his international debut for Madagascar in 2014.
