= Jean Duprat (mayor) =

French politician

Jean Duprat (22 December 1760–31 October 1793) was active in the French Revolution in Avignon. At the start of the revolution, he supported the annexation of Avignon by France. He was suspected of involvement in the Massacres of La Glacière in 1791. He was elected as mayor of Avignon in 1792.

He was also a deputy in the National Assembly, and voted for the execution of the king. He was among the Girondin deputies arrested in 1793. He was tried and guillotined in Paris. His brother was Jean Étienne Benoît Duprat.
