= Massacres of La Glacière =

The massacres of La Glacière that took place during 16–17 October 1791 in the Tour de la Glacière of the Palais des Papes at Avignon, then recently united to France, were an isolated and early example of violence in the opening phase of the French Revolution; the massacres are interpreted by French historians not as presaging the September massacres of 1792 and the Reign of Terror but as a last episode in the struggle between partisans and advocates of the reunion of the papal enclave of Avignon and the Comtat Venaissin with the state of France.

== Overview ==
With the opening events of the Revolution, the revolutionary Avignonnais had forced a new municipal election, expelled the papal vice-legate (12 June 1790) and demanded to be united with France, but the conservative rural population of Carpentras remained faithful to their papal overlord. The outcome was virtually civil war in the region, with assassinations and mob violence.

In the superheated atmosphere, following circulated reports of miraculous tears on the Madonna of the Cordeliers, a papiste mob lynched a patriot municipal administrator, Nicolas Jean-Baptiste Lescuyer, who was falsely suspected of planning to seize church property.

Jean Duprat, a silk merchant elected mayor of Avignon the previous June, was suspected of having participated. Some sixty persons were summarily executed in a tower of the Palais des Papes, following the lynching. Amnesty for the executioners, as patriots, was debated in Paris, as justice in revolutionary France became more and more politicised.

Mathieu Jouve Jourdan (fr), nicknamed "Jourdan Coupe-Tête", was implicated in the atrocities, eventually traduced to the revolutionary tribunal, condemned to death and guillotined on 8 prairial II (27 May 1794).

The savage massacres of La Glacière, dramatised in popular engravings, were traumatic in the region and appalled the reading public of the Age of Enlightenment; they reverberated for a generation. Jules Michelet devoted two chapters of his massive history of the Revolution to the massacres.

== Sources ==
- Martin, Jean-Clément, Violence et Révolution: Essai sur la naissance d’un mythe national. (Paris: Éditions du Seuil), 2006.
- Moulinas, René, Les massacres de la Glacière: Enquête sur un crime impuni, Avignon 16–17 octobre 1791. (Aix-en-Provence: Edisud), 2003.
