= Nicolas Jean-Baptiste Lescuyer =

Nicolas Jean-Baptiste Lescuyer (died 16 October 1791) was an administrator during the French Revolution in Avignon, which France had annexed from Papal rule.

Amid rising factional tensions, Lescuyer was eventually lynched by supporters of the Pope.
