= Philippe Vardon =

French far-right politician and activist

Member of the Regional Council of Provence-Alpes-Côte d'Azur
- Incumbent
- Assumed office 2015

Member of the Nice Municipal Council
- In office 2020–2026

Personal details
- Born: September 2, 1980 (age 46) Nice, France
- Party: Identity–Liberties (since 2024)
- Other political affiliations: Unité Radicale (1998–2002); National Republican Movement (1999–?); Bloc identitaire (2003–2014); National Rally (2015–2022); Reconquête (2022–2024)
- Occupation: Politician, activist, musician

Philippe Vardon (born 2 September 1980) is a French far-right politician and activist.

Singer of the nationalist-revolutionary rock band Fraction from 1998 to 2006, he became a leading figure of the French identitarian movement by founding the Jeunesses identitaires in 2002, and the Bloc identitaire's Nice-based branch Nissa Rebela in 2005.

He joined the National Front (FN, later renamed the National Rally (RN)) in 2015, and was elected regional councillor of Provence-Alpes-Côte d'Azur that same year, a mandate he was re-elected to in 2021. Having led several electoral campaigns in Nice without managing to win the mayoralty, he was nonetheless elected to the Nice municipal council, serving from 2020 to 2026.

Expelled from the RN in 2022, he joined Reconquête, which he left in 2024 to take over as operational director of Marion Maréchal's party Identity–Liberties.

== Biography ==
=== Background ===
Philippe Vardon was born on 2 September 1980 in Nice, to a nursing-assistant mother who was herself the daughter of pieds-noirs, and a father who came from a long-established family in Nice and was a long-standing activist with the National Front. Vardon describes their relationship as "up and down". Following his parents' divorce, at around the age of ten he found himself living alone with his mother in the Moulins neighbourhood of Nice, where she was working three jobs at the time. When his younger brother, Benoît, was born, he was given the task of choosing his first name. Benoît Vardon is also an identitarian activist. Philippe Vardon studied law and later obtained a diplôme d'études supérieures spécialisées in political science, for which he wrote a master's thesis on the OGC Nice supporters' club. He also worked as a nightclub bouncer.

=== Early activism (1990s–2002) ===
From middle school onward, Philippe Vardon took part in activities of the Front national de la jeunesse, then, as a high school student, was active within Renouveau étudiant, before joining Jeune Résistance, the youth movement of Nouvelle Résistance led by Fabrice Robert. He then became associated with Unité Radicale, and, whilst studying law, founded its student wing, the Union des étudiants nationalistes, in response to what he described as "the consequences of the immigration-invasion our country is enduring". Although he denies having held any direct leadership position in Unité Radicale, a collective book on "new nationalists" lists him as a member of its political bureau, responsible for the movement's student wing (in particular the Union des étudiants nationalistes within it), and he describes his own role in the movement since its founding in the book. He was also one of the two vice-presidents of Unité Radicale, responsible for propaganda, alongside Guillaume Luyt, who was in charge of organisation. He then defined himself as pro-European and a regionalist, and notably cited the Belgian Nazi Léon Degrelle in his "ideological pantheon". In 1999, following the split from the FN, he joined the National Republican Movement, where he met Nicolas Bay.

Vardon has also been involved within the skinhead counterculture, in the nationalist-revolutionary rock band Fraction, alongside Fabrice Robert, where he served as lead singer from 1998 to 2007. According to journalist Marine Turchi, the band made repeated antisemitic allusions, and its logo was inspired by that of the Black Front, a revolutionary and anti-capitalist splinter group of the Nazi Party. The band's repertoire included the track Camarade (2006), which set to music a poem by collaborationist writer Robert Brasillach. In 2002, the group released a split record with the German neo-Nazi band Hauptkampflinie. In 1998, a documentary about skinheads titled Skin or Die showed Vardon surrounded by shaven-headed men performing Nazi salutes while he sang the chorus of Fraction's song Europe jeunesse révolution. Questioned by Mediapart about this in 2023, he said he rejected all forms of antisemitism and described the episode as a mistake that he regretted. He was also filmed singing lyrics from the song La Zyklon Army by the neo-Nazi band Evil Skins.

=== Within Bloc identitaire (2002–2014) ===
The lambda, an identitarian symbol adopted on the initiative of Philippe Vardon.

After Unité Radicale was dissolved in 2002, following the attempted assassination of Jacques Chirac by one of its members, Maxime Brunerie, Vardon founded the Jeunesses identitaires, one of the three organisations established to replace Unité Radicale, with Guillaume Luyt chairing Les Identitaires and Fabrice Robert chairing the Bloc identitaire. To guard against a possible ban, the Jeunesses identitaires split into independent local groups. Vardon subsequently chaired the association Les Identitaires from 2011 to 2016, succeeding Luyt. In 2005, Vardon founded Nissa Rebela, an identitarian association based in the Pays niçois. In Nice, he opened a clothing shop, The Firm Casual Shop, which also served as a venue for talks. Within the Bloc identitaire, he originated the use of the Spartan lambda as the movement's symbol, drawing on the 2006 success of Zack Snyder's film 300; the symbol was later adopted by other identitarian movements in Europe and North America. In his book Éléments pour une contre-culture identitaire (2011), he devotes several entries to Spartan references, notably the Battle of Thermopylae, which he presents as a model of collective sacrifice against an external enemy.

He stood in the 2007 French legislative election under the Nissa Rebela label in the 1st constituency of Alpes-Maritimes, winning 773 votes in the first round, or 2.29% of votes cast. In 2008 he led an identitarian list in the Nice municipal elections, winning 3.03% of the vote. Matteo Salvini, leader of the Lega Nord, endorsed him ahead of the vote. That same year, he also stood for election in the 2nd canton of Nice and won 4.22% of the vote. In 2010 he allied with Jacques Bompard and the League of the South for the 2010 French regional elections, serving as campaign director, as a conviction depriving him of his civil rights prevented him from standing as a candidate himself; the list secured 2.69% of the vote in the region.

He met Marine Le Pen for the first time in 2011, though she remained reserved towards him at the time. Despite backing her in 2012, Vardon's application to join the Rassemblement bleu Marine was rejected by the FN leader in 2013, owing to a dispute with Jean-Marie Le Pen during a debate in the 2010 regional campaign, as well as the identitarians' regionalist positioning. He initially received his membership card, but Gilbert Collard described the enrolment as a "bug" and had his dues refunded. Vardon won 4.43% of the vote in the 2014 French municipal elections, compared with 15.6% for the FN list led by Marie-Christine Arnautu, a candidate parachuted in from Paris. FN activist Romain Cardelli said he had been threatened by Vardon before the 2014 municipal elections over a place on the list, and said he was later slapped by him when the list was announced, and threatened again during a council meeting, following a dispute over the political exploitation of the murder of Hervé Gourdel. Following this election, Arnautu, who was quickly sidelined by her own parliamentary group, drew closer to Vardon and his networks; he became her unofficial adviser and her point of contact in Nice.

=== Within the National Front/National Rally (2015–2022) ===
Spotted by Marion Maréchal, who initially commissioned him to write briefs, Vardon was included on her list for the 2015 regional elections in Provence-Alpes-Côte d'Azur. He was placed fifth on the list in Alpes-Maritimes and was elected regional councillor after the second round. He was officially no longer a member of the Bloc identitaire or Nissa Rebela at the time of his 2015 candidacy, though he described himself as remaining a "moral authority" for identitarian activists in Nice.

Around 2017, he advised Nicolas Bay, then FN secretary-general, on his communications as a Member of the European Parliament, presenting himself as an outside contractor to the European Parliament; Mediapart reported that his role was more substantial, including drafting weekly briefing notes for pre-selected candidates ahead of the 2017 French legislative election, a claim he disputes. He also stood in that election in the 3rd constituency of Alpes-Maritimes against incumbent Rudy Salles, winning 21.25% of the first-round vote and qualifying for the runoff against Cédric Roussel, who had won 31.91%. Roussel won the second round with 60.84% of the vote to Vardon's 39.16%. With the support of Maréchal, he joined the party’s national bureau in 2018. When asked about him in 2019, Marine Le Pen described him as someone who had gone through "a few years of purgatory" before embarking on "a path that is calmer and more serene". During the 2019 European elections, Philippe Vardon served as deputy campaign director for the National Rally.

He led the RN's "Retrouver Nice" list in Nice in the 2020 French municipal elections. His campaign emphasised security, opposition to communitarianism, criticism of local taxation, and the issue of Islam, accusing the outgoing municipal administration of having compromised itself with Islamist associations. His list received the official backing of Thierry Mariani's La Droite populaire, as well as that of David Rachline, mayor of Fréjus. In the first round, Vardon won 16.7% of the vote, placing second behind incumbent mayor Christian Estrosi; in the second round, in a three-way contest won by Estrosi, he won 21.4%, without making significant inroads into the mainstream right-wing electorate. He was thereby elected to the Nice municipal council. In the vote for the presidency of the Métropole Nice Côte d'Azur, Vardon received eight votes against 116 for Estrosi, who was re-elected to head the intercommunal body.

In the 2021 Provence-Alpes-Côte d'Azur regional election, he served as campaign director for the RN list led by Mariani. He also stood on this list in Alpes-Maritimes and was re-elected regional councillor.

=== Move to Reconquête, then to Identity–Liberties (since 2022) ===
In 2022, the RN's national council declined to endorse Vardon in the 3rd constituency of Alpes-Maritimes for the 2022 French legislative election, choosing instead Benoît Kandel, a former deputy mayor under Estrosi. Vardon nonetheless stood as an independent candidate, with the backing of the Reconquête party, and was consequently expelled from the RN. He finished fifth with 10.86% of the vote and was eliminated in the first round. Vardon then joined Reconquête, where he held senior positions.

In the 2024 European Parliament election in France, he was placed tenth on the Reconquête list and was not elected. He left Reconquête the day after the election, following Marion Maréchal. That same year, he became a parliamentary aide to three MPs close to Maréchal and affiliated with the RN group in the National Assembly: Thibaut Monnier, Anne Sicard and Eddy Casterman. Marine Le Pen quickly voiced her opposition to this hire to the MPs concerned, giving them an ultimatum to choose between keeping him on staff or remaining attached to the RN group. Vardon ended his role before the start of the parliamentary session, saying his contract had only ever been intended to cover the team-building period. In December 2024, Maréchal appointed him operational director of her new party, Identity–Liberties, with the title of general delegate.

Excluded by Éric Ciotti from the far-right coalition formed around his candidacy for mayor of Nice, Vardon did not stand for re-election to the municipal council in 2026, and lost his position as leader of the opposition.

== Political views ==
In 2011, Vardon published the essay Éléments pour une contre-culture identitaire with publisher IDées. Presented as an alphabetically arranged primer, the book sets out new criteria for reading identitarian culture. He argues that the right has long neglected the cultural battle, which he sought to engage by building, particularly for young people, a set of alternative references and practices intended to spread through the population. In it, he claims a synthesis between writer Georges Bernanos and the straight edge movement, and acknowledges deliberately mixing left- and right-wing references alongside both contemporary, popular material and more classical or elitist ones. In a 2009 text titled "Tous drogués", published on the site Une autre jeunesse, Vardon asked whether straight edge amounted to a revolt against the modern world. He has said he freely draws on cultural or political repertoires outside his own, observing and borrowing from elsewhere on the political spectrum, and claims a synthesis blending elements of both the radical right and the ultra-left.

As early as 2006, Philippe Vardon justified the identitarian movement's involvement in elections by citing the need to make its mark in this arena, arguing that their ideas were otherwise "not defended by anyone". In 2012, reflecting on the electoral failure of the Bloc identitaire, he acknowledged that "when [they] sought to be a "traditional" party", they "did not succeed". That same year, referring to the rapprochement between the Bloc identitaire and the FN under Marine Le Pen's leadership, he stated that "since 2009, things have changed" and that a "renewed National Front has emerged, with which discussions have taken place, are taking place and will continue to take place".

While the FN defines itself as nationalist, Jacobin and sovereigntist, Vardon and the Identitarians advocate a France of regions within a Europe of peoples and identities. In the early 2000s he described European integration as a "political necessity". In 2015, however, he acknowledged a personal shift on the subject, saying he had initially believed it possible to redirect the European project before coming to see the European Union as, in his view, the enemy of European civilisation. Historian of the radical right Stéphane François noted a semantic shift in Vardon's language, as he came to prefer describing himself as "rooted" ("enraciné") rather than "regionalist," with François arguing that his regionalism had become largely folkloric while his anti-Jacobinism was fading.

On Islam, Vardon considers the assimilation of Muslims in France, as advocated by Marine Le Pen, to be impossible, citing what he presents as their current demographic proportions. He also endorses the Great Replacement conspiracy theory and the concept of remigration, positions that go beyond the FN's official line. He attended the "Assises de la remigration" in November 2014 and helped draft the Bloc identitaire's "26 measures" on the subject. In 2014, Vardon authored a book titled L'Imam Estrosi. Demain à Nice, vingt mosquées ?, in which he accused the mayor of Nice of colluding with proponents of Muslim Brotherhood doctrine in France.

In 2015, political scientist Jean-Yves Camus noted that leading figures of the Bloc identitaire, including Vardon, had distanced themselves from certain tenets of their early activism, such as antisemitism, as they sought to integrate into mainstream institutional politics. François similarly observed that Vardon had abandoned violence and would privately acknowledge that violent activism led nowhere.

== Legal affairs ==
=== Proceedings brought by Vardon ===
In 2013, Vardon obtained the conviction of Nice mayor Christian Estrosi over a municipal grant to a Muslim prayer hall, ruled contrary to the principle of secularism.

In 2017, Estrosi described Vardon as an "heir to Goebbels" during a plenary session of the regional council. Vardon sued him for defamation; Estrosi won the case on final appeal in 2021.

During a debate in the 2015 regional election campaign, political communications consultant Patricia Balme said on i-Télé that Vardon had performed a Nazi salute in the 1998 documentary Skin or Die. Vardon sued Balme and i-Télé's publication director for defamation. In 2017, the Nice criminal court found them guilty, handing down suspended fines and ordering payment of symbolic damages and legal costs to Vardon.

He also sued the newspaper La Marseillaise for defamation over a 2017 column that described him as a "devotee of the fascist salute". The court cleared the newspaper of defamation, finding that its author had exercised due caution in the piece, and rejected Vardon's claim for damages.

=== Convictions ===
Vardon and the Jeunesses identitaires were convicted in 2007 of reconstituting a banned organisation and of discrimination, over their "Neither veiled nor raped" ("Ni voilée ni violée") poster campaign. In 2008, these convictions were increased on appeal and Vardon was stripped of his civil rights for two years.

In 2014, on the night of the municipal elections in Fréjus, Vardon was involved in a brawl that led, along with three other participants, to a six-month prison sentence handed down in 2016. He appealed, saying he had been attacked while with his family and had used tear gas in self-defence. The appeals court set aside the finding of assault with a weapon made at first instance, ruled that his use of tear gas amounted to legitimate self-defence, and fined him €750.

== Bibliography ==
- Casajus, Emmanuel (2012). "Les Identitaires ou l'art de négocier avec les signes". Oscillations (in French) (1): 54–63. HAL halshs-05533754v1.
- François, Stéphane; Nonjon, Adrien (2023). "« Nous sommes ce que vous fûtes, nous serons ce que vous êtes. » Sparte et l'extrême droite: comparaison France/Ukraine". Frontière·s (in French) (9). doi:10.35562/frontieres.1820.
- Henry, Michel (2017). La Nièce: Le Phénomène Marion Maréchal-Le Pen (in French). Paris: Seuil. chap. 9, "Philippe Vardon, deuxième identitaire". ISBN 9782021337785.
- Ivaldi, Gilles; Pina, Christine (2023). "À Nice, rien de nouveau?". In Lefebvre, Rémi; Vignon, Sébastien (eds.). Démobilisation électorale dans la France urbaine. Les élections municipales de 2020 (in French). Rennes: Presses universitaires de Rennes. pp. 147–159. ISBN 9782753588608.
- Jacquet-Vaillant, Marion (2026). Les Identitaires : Enquête aux marges du politique. Bibliothèque de science politique (in French). Vol. 7. Preface by Nicolas Lebourg. Paris: Classiques Garnier. ISBN 978-2-406-20504-3.
