= Fabrice Robert =

French far-right activist

- Born: 1971 (age 54–55)
- Citizenship: French
- Education: University of Nice Sophia Antipolis (Maîtrise)
- Occupation: Activist
- Era: Late 20th and early 21st century
- Organization(s): Third Way; Nouvelle Résistance; Unité Radicale
- Known for: Co-founding Les Identitaires and the identitarian movement
- Political party: Les Identitaires (2003–present)
- Other political affiliations: National Front (1987–2001); National Republican Movement (2002)
- Movement: Identitarian movement, nationalist-revolutionary movement

Fabrice Robert (born in 1971) is a French political activist, a figure of the nationalist-revolutionary movement and later of the identitarian movement. He was a member of Third Way and later of Nouvelle Résistance, and served as a National Front (FN) city council member in La Courneuve from 1995 to 2001. In 1998, he helped found Unité Radicale, becoming one of its leaders, and in April 2003, he co-founded the Bloc identitaire with Guillaume Luyt and Philippe Vardon, serving as its president. He founded the Novopress news agency in 2005. He has been the bassist of rock identitaire français band Fraction since its founding in 1994. He was convicted in 1992 for distributing negationist leaflets, and again in 2005 for defamation.

== Biography ==
=== Background ===
Fabrice Robert was born in 1971. In 1996 he obtained a maîtrise in political science from the Université Nice-Sophia-Antipolis, on the subject of nationalist propaganda through music, under the title La Diffusion de l'idéal identitaire européen à travers la musique contemporaine ("The spread of the European identitarian ideal through contemporary music"); in it he concluded that the internet represented the best vehicle for spreading identitarian ideas and that music was an essential component of this.

=== Political activism ===
In 1987, at the age of 16, he joined the National Front, before moving on to the neo-fascist movement Third Way. He was a skinhead then. Robert then joined Nouvelle Résistance as soon as it was founded by Christian Bouchet in 1991. He was responsible for youth affairs there. From 1995 to 2001, Robert served as an FN municipal councillor in La Courneuve. In 1997, he co-founded the Union des cercles Résistance (Union of Resistance Circles) with Bouchet, an organisation aimed at "coordinating the activities of the radicals" within the FN.

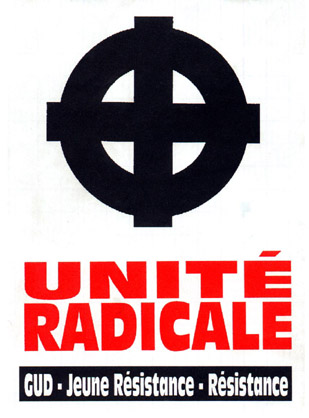
Logo of Unité Radicale, co-founded by Robert in 1998

In 1998 he took part in founding Unité Radicale. It was through contacts he personally established that the Groupe Union Défense joined the alliance. He was the webmaster of Unité Radicale's website, at the time among the most-visited sites of the far-right online scene, drawing nearly 60,000 page views a month in spring 2002. Robert was also head of the National Republican Movement (MNR) in Nice and helped organise the MNR congress held in that city in February 2002, at which he was elected, alongside Christian Bouchet, to the MNR's national council. That same month Robert became Unité Radicale's spokesperson after the post was created. In April 2002, Bouchet handed leadership of Unité Radicale to Guillaume Luyt and Fabrice Robert.

Robert and Bouchet were both expelled from the MNR following Maxime Brunerie's assassination attempt on Jacques Chirac. Bruno Mégret invoked the MNR's statutory ban on dual membership, which Nicolas Lebourg describes as a pretext, since an exemption had explicitly been granted to Unité Radicale members in 2000. After Unité Radicale was dissolved over the Chirac assassination attempt, Robert published an editorial titled "Le combat continue" ("The struggle continues") on a transitional website, dissolution-ur.com, criticising the movement's dissolution by drawing a parallel with the fact that the Human Rights League had not been dissolved after the massacre committed by its member Richard Durn, and framing the nascent identitarian struggle as a spirit of resistance against what he described as the dangers immigration and racial mixing posed to the French people and culture.

Following the trauma of Unité Radicale's dissolution, and in an effort to break with the legacy of fascism, the Bloc identitaire was founded in April 2003 by Fabrice Robert, Guillaume Luyt and Philippe Vardon. This effort produced a racialist discourse close to that of Europe-Action in the 1960s, as well as an Islamophobic stance. Working in digital communications, and having founded Novopress in 2005, it was largely on Robert's initiative that the movement adopted an internet-based communication strategy. In May 2003, the Jeunesses identitaires issued a statement calling for pressure to be put on the rap group Sniper, accused of anti-French racism, in order to block its tour. Robert, on behalf of the Bloc identitaire, and Vardon, on behalf of the Jeunesses identitaires, coordinated the activists' lobbying effort. The campaign reached as far as the National Assembly, through MP Nadine Morano, and forced Sniper to cancel 20 tour dates.

==== Countercultural activities ====
In 1994 he took part in founding Fraction Hexagone, the best-known band of the French far right in the 1990s, whose members were at the time activists in Nouvelle Résistance. He is the band's bassist. In 2002 Fabrice Robert explained that the aim had been to create a vehicle for politicisation within the skinhead movement, without the band either splitting from it or becoming a separate political structure, the objective being the radicalisation of extremist youth, particularly nationalist-revolutionary youth. In 1998, when Nouvelle Résistance was transformed into Unité Radicale, the band dropped the name "Hexagone" and became simply Fraction. Fraction ceased activity in 2004. The group, still fronted by Robert, resumed activity in 2023 with a new album.

In 1995, Nouvelle Résistance launched the skinhead fanzine Jeune Résistance, with Robert as its editor. Jeune Résistance was presented not as an organ of Nouvelle Résistance but as a heavily politicised skinhead fanzine that translated nationalist-revolutionary themes for a skinhead readership.

Fabrice Robert coordinated the Bleu-Blanc-Rock (BBR) label, which relied on activist bands and their own propaganda material. BBR produced a rock identitaire français cassette sold for 10 francs, with a politically neutral cover, of which more than 5,000 copies were sold, as well as the CD Antimondial.

== Convictions ==
In 1992 he was fined 10,000 francs for distributing negationist leaflets denying the existence of Nazi gas chambers.

In 2005, then director of publication of the Jeunesses identitaires website, Fabrice Robert was convicted of insult and defamation against a school headmaster, and fined €5,000 (€3,500 suspended), plus €1,500 in damages, after the site had criticised the headmaster's ban on wearing the Harrington jacket, deemed a "symbol of belonging to a group whose ideology is racism".

== Bibliography ==
- Cahuzac, Yannick; François, Stéphane (2013). "Les stratégies de communication de la mouvance identitaire. Le cas du Bloc identitaire". Questions de communication (in French). 23 (1): 275–292. doi:10.4000/questionsdecommunication.8455.
- Dupin, Éric (2017). La France identitaire: Enquête sur la réaction qui vient. Cahiers libres (in French). Paris: La Découverte. chapter 2, "L'agit-prop de Génération identitaire". ISBN 9782707191205.
- Jacquet-Vaillant, Marion (2026). Les Identitaires : Enquête aux marges du politique. Bibliothèque de science politique (in French). Vol. 7. Preface by Nicolas Lebourg. Paris: Classiques Garnier. ISBN 978-2-406-20504-3.
- Lebourg, Nicolas (2004). "Stratégies et pratiques du mouvement nationaliste-révolutionnaire français : départs, desseins et destin d'Unité Radicale (1989–2002)". Le Banquet (in French). 19–20: 381–400.
- Lebourg, Nicolas; Sistach, Dominique (2012). "The Role of Underground Music in the Renewal of the French Radical Right Wing". In Shekhovtsov, Anton; Jackson, Paul (eds.). White Power Music: Scenes of Extreme Right Cultural Resistance. Searchlight and RNM. pp. 25–34. ISBN 978-0952203896.
