= Nissa Rebela =

Regional movement of the Bloc identitaire

- Formation: 2005; 21 years ago
- Founder: Philippe Vardon; Benoît Loeuillet
- Founded at: Nice, France
- Type: Nonprofit
- Legal status: Association loi de 1901
- Region served: Pays niçois
- Methods: Electoral campaigns, media stunts
- Members: 300–400 (2010)
- Official language: French
- Leader: Benoît Vardon
- Parent organization: Les Identitaires
- Subsidiaries: Jouinessa Rebela
- Website: nissarebela.com (archived)

Nissa Rebela is a regional movement of the Bloc identitaire, founded by Philippe Vardon and Benoît Loeuillet in 2005 in Nice. According to researcher Robert Bistolfi, the movement promotes a violent, anti-republican Islamophobia whose central thread is the Great Replacement conspiracy theory; it also promotes Niçard patriotism. It became known for several communication stunts directed against Muslims and for its recurring opposition to the mayor of Nice, Christian Estrosi. It was electorally active between 2007 and 2014, then declined after Vardon and Loeuillet's rallying to the National Front (FN).

== History ==
Nissa Rebela is a regional movement of the Bloc identitaire, founded by Philippe Vardon and Benoît Loeuillet in 2005 and active in Nice. Its youth wing is Jouinessa Rebela. Vardon, also a co-founder of the Bloc identitaire and of the Jeunesses identitaires, is a member of the nationalist music group Fraction and a former activist of Unité Radicale. Loeuillet founded the ultras supporters' association of OGC Nice, Brigade Sud, which was dissolved in 2010 after several incidents. Around 2010, Nissa Rebela had approximately 300 to 400 members, a third of whom were under 25. In June 2010, Nissa Rebela activists opened premises on Rue Ribotti named Lou Bastioun, intended as a political office, a gym and conference room, and an associative bar. These premises succeeded an earlier venue, La Maïoun, open since 2004.

Nissa Rebela became known for several communication stunts. In 2005, during an action presented as an act of solidarity with homeless people, the movement organized a distribution of pork soup, effectively excluding people of Muslim and Jewish faith. It also organized a "porchetta and rosé apéritif" in a downtown Nice neighborhood with a large Muslim population. The movement held an annual "Nissart Pride". It also set up security patrols on regional trains. Its youth wing, Jouinessa Rebela, also took part in the occupation of the Great Mosque of Poitiers in 2012.

In 2006, Nissa Rebela accused Christian Estrosi, then president of the General Council of Alpes-Maritimes, of having supported a project to build a large mosque in Nice. During the campaign for the 2008 municipal elections, movement activists confronted Estrosi at a market, chanting "Estrosi complicit, no mosque in Nice". In 2011, Vardon denounced the emergence of a "halal neighborhood" downtown and accused mayor Estrosi of "submission to every form of communitarianism".

At the end of 2014, Loeuillet stepped down from all his functions within Nissa Rebela, owing to the National Front's ban on dual membership with the Bloc identitaire. In 2015, Vardon joined the ranks of the FN, followed by part of Nissa Rebela's membership. He then handed over leadership of the movement and its premises to younger activists, notably his brother Benoît Vardon. In the 2015 departmental elections in Alpes-Maritimes, several FN candidates were former members of Nissa Rebela. Political scientist Jean-Yves Camus read this rapprochement as a bet by the FN on Nissa Rebela's local roots, attributing it to former Nissa Rebela members' command of modern communication tools and their day-to-day activist experience, which made them a pool of candidates already trained in campaign techniques.

In 2018, Lou Bastioun was renamed Club 15.43. Its spokesperson, Grégoire de Linares, is a staffer for the National Rally group on Nice's municipal council. After the dissolution of Generation Identity in 2021, local identitarian activists renamed themselves Banda Segurana. The premises also host the Cercle Lépante, which organizes talks with figures close to Action Française, as well as Zoulous Nice, a violent group that emerged in 2020 whose appearance coincided with the opening, in the same premises, of a boxing gym.

== Ideology ==
According to Robert Bistolfi, the movement promotes a violent, anti-republican Islamophobia. Its main ideological thread rests on the Great Replacement conspiracy theory. To respond to what its activists call the "ethnic fracture", Nissa Rebela advocates sending back to their countries of origin a large number of immigrants and descendants of immigrants, a policy it calls remigration. Since being born in France is not considered sufficient to guarantee belonging, this "return" could also apply to French nationals deemed insufficiently assimilated. Nissa Rebela also campaigns against what it describes as anti-White racism.

The organization promotes Niçard patriotism, which it seeks to situate within a France organized into regions, itself part of a Europe made up of nations. This stance caused the failure of an attempted rapprochement with the FN at the national level. The movement's platform contains no institutional proposals, with any progress on that front made contingent on a prior "identitarian reconquest". The figures claimed by Nissa Rebela as forebears include Catherine Ségurane, a legendary heroine of the 1543 siege of Nice; the barbets, inhabitants of villages in the County of Nice who resisted the French army's occupation at the time of the French Revolution; Jacques Médecin; Albert Spaggiari, a far-right activist turned criminal; and Louis-Auguste Blanqui.

== Electoral results ==
In the 2007 legislative elections, Nissa Rebela fielded four candidates in Alpes-Maritimes. In the 2008 municipal elections, Philippe Vardon received 3.03% of the vote. In the 2008 cantonal elections in Nice's sixth canton, the movement's secretary-general Benoît Loeuillet received 5.09% of the vote; the following year, he received 7.68%. In the 2010 regional elections, the Bloc identitaire allied with Jacques Bompard's League of the South on a joint list in Provence-Alpes-Côte d'Azur, obtaining 32 of the list's 123 places; Nissa Rebela was represented there by the tandem of Benoît Loeuillet and Aulde Maisonneuve.

Ahead of the 2011 cantonal elections, Nissa Rebela allied with former Nice mayor Jacques Peyrat. Peyrat and his supporters were to back Vardon in the third canton, and vice versa. This agreement was weakened when the FN officially endorsed Peyrat, while an FN candidate also ran in the third canton against Vardon. Despite a substantial grassroots campaign, the movement's results did not improve, scoring between 3% and 4%.

In 2012, Nissa Rebela announced its support for Marine Le Pen's presidential bid, following an internal vote in which 79% of voters backed the move. Vardon, then a declared candidate in the 2012 legislative election in Alpes-Maritimes's 5th constituency against incumbent MP Christian Estrosi, hoped in return for the FN's endorsement. That support did not materialize, and Vardon ultimately withdrew from the race.

In the 2014 municipal elections in Nice, Vardon won 4.43% of the vote in the first round. He stepped down as the movement's president ahead of the vote in order to join the Rassemblement bleu Marine, before ultimately running alone for lack of an agreement with the FN.

== Bibliography ==
- Bistolfi, Robert (2015). "Dérives identitaires : culture régionale face à l'extrémisme dans le Comté de Nice". Confluences Méditerranée (in French) (93): 145–154. doi:10.3917/come.093.0145. ISSN 1148-2664.
