= Fraction (band) =

French far-right rock band

- Logo of Fraction

Background information
- Also known as: Fraction Hexagone
- Origin: Nice, France
- Genres: Rock identitaire français; oi!; hardcore punk; hard rock; heavy metal; hatecore
- Years active: 1994–present
- Members: Fabrice Robert; Pascal de los Rios ("Le Squale"); Brice; Chris; Jean ("RHD")
- Past members: Greg; Stéphane; Thierry; Ghislain; Nicolas; Alex; Benjamin "Bob"; Christophe; Philippe Vardon; Didier; Olivier; Yann
- Website: https://fraction-officiel.com/

Fraction, originally Fraction Hexagone, is a rock identitaire français band founded by Fabrice Robert in 1994 in Nice. Their lyrics combine antisemitism, Holocaust denial, and, from the 2000s onward, Islamophobia.

== History ==
The band was formed in 1994 in Nice under the name Fraction Hexagone, from the merger of two earlier formations, Septembre Noir and Freikorps. It was founded by Fabrice Robert, a former skinhead of the neofascist movement Third Way. Robert plays bass in the group. When the band first formed, the singer was Pascal de los Rios, also known as "Le Squale." At the time, the band's members were activists of Nouvelle Résistance, the movement that succeeded Third Way.

The group adopted as its logo the gear marked with a hammer and a sword of Otto Strasser's Black Front, a symbol already used by the neo-Nazi label Rebelles Européens. As Nouvelle Résistance occupied the ideological niche of National Bolshevism, Fraction Hexagone rejected any association with Rock Against Communism (RAC) and redefined the acronym RAC to "Rock Against Capitalism". Lilian Mathieu nonetheless classifies the band within RAC. Kirsten Dyck also describes them as hatecore. The band cites influences including Georges Sorel, Louis-Auguste Blanqui, Pierre Drieu La Rochelle, Ernst Jünger, brothers Gregor and Otto Strasser, Che Guevara, Subcomandante Marcos, Robert Brasillach, and Friedrich Nietzsche. Under the influence of the Canadian band RaHoWa and the label Resistance Records, Fraction Hexagone adopted radical antisemitism, neo-Nazism, and the global Jewish conspiracy theory characteristic of the North American white power movement. In 2000, in a German skinhead fanzine, Fraction claimed that President Jacques Chirac was "a slave of ZOG".

The group initially played in the oi! style, before quickly evolving toward hardcore punk, hard rock, and metal. They released the album Rejoins nos rangs in October 1996, pressed at just over 1,000 copies and containing twelve tracks, including "Une balle" ("A Bullet"), whose lyrics call for "a bullet for the Zionists," "a bullet for the [police]," "a bullet for cosmopolitans," and "a bullet for the Yankees." The National Front refused to allow the track to be played at its annual Bleu-Blanc-Rouge Festival. Band members were placed under formal investigation in 1998 for complicity in provocation of violence over the song; this judicial decision was ultimately overturned on a procedural technicality. The album was praised among white power music fans. Fraction Hexagone released its second album, Le Fléau, in 1997. Across these first two albums, the band developed a nationalist mythology and a radical anti-Zionism. Its lyrics addressed Europe, anti-capitalism, rejection of middle-class bourgeois values, Holocaust denial, and what it termed "American-Zionist imperialism". On stage, the musicians performed with face paint modeled on the hero of the film Braveheart.

In 1998, when Nouvelle Résistance transformed into Unité Radicale, the band dropped "Hexagone" from its name to become simply Fraction. Fraction then took part in launching the rock identitaire français (RIF) scene and became, according to Nicolas Lebourg and Dominique Sistach, the leading French-language act of the nationalist scene. For Mathieu, Fraction is the principal heir of RAC within RIF. Philippe Vardon became the band's singer for the album Le Son d'histoire (2000), which addressed the Zapatista uprising on the track "Ya basta", and radical ecology on the track "Écoguerrier". Lebourg and Sistach described this orientation as provocative and daring within a skinhead scene then dominated by neo-Nazism and oi! music. Robert explained in 2002 that "the goal was to create a hyper-politic group within the skinhead movement without straying away from the environment: the goal being radicalisation of extremist youths, especially the National and Revolutionary youth." Through this, Fraction Hexagone carried Nouvelle Résistance's ideas into the neo-Nazi skinhead fanzine Militants blancs. On the mini-album Reconquista (2001), the band called for the reconquest of Europe in the face of Islam, drawing in part on völkisch ideals stemming from the Nouvelle Droite. In the song "Esclavage mondial" ("Global Slavery"), they portrayed immigration as a capitalist endeavor aimed at destroying peoples. In 2002, Fraction released a split album with the German neo-Nazi band Hauptkampflinie; one of the tracks, "Kommando Werwolf", takes its name from the Werwolf corps of Nazi volunteers created in 1944 by Heinrich Himmler. The band went on to release the album Europa in 2006. On the track "Camarade", Fraction adapts a poem by the collaborationist writer Robert Brasillach. Vardon left the band the following year.

Fraction released Réveille-toi ! ("Wake Up!") in 2021, in which they denounced the "health dictatorship" and the "Great Replacement". Pascal de los Rios then made his return as a singer. Fraction toured with the Italian band Katastrof between 2022 and 2023. Fraction also headlined a concert organized following the May 9 Committee march in 2023. In December 2023, Fraction released a new three-track mini-album featuring Alain Perez, former singer of the neo-Nazi band Légion 88. It includes a cover of Légion 88's Terroristes, a song that originally targeted immigrants but now targets Islamists, its lyrics promising massacres following any attack against one of their own.

== Bibliography ==
- Dyck, Kirsten (2016). Reichsrock: The International Web of White-Power and Neo-Nazi Hate Music. New Brunswick: Rutgers University Press. pp. 66–68. ISBN 978-0-8135-7471-4.
- Lebourg, Nicolas; Sistach, Dominique (2012). "The Role of Underground Music in the Renewal of the French Radical Right Wing". In Shekhovtsov, Anton; Jackson, Paul (eds.). White Power Music: Scenes of Extreme Right Cultural Resistance. Searchlight and RNM. pp. 25–34. ISBN 978-0952203896.
- Mathieu, Lilian (2006). "Une musique groupusculaire : le rock identitaire français". In Mathieu, Lilian; Balasinski, Justyne (eds.). Art et contestation. Presses universitaires de Rennes. pp. 121–136. doi:10.4000/books.pur.12464.
