= T&P =

T&P may refer to:

- Texas and Pacific Railway
- Task & Purpose, an American military news website
- Terrance and Phillip
- Terre et Peuple
- Thoughts and prayers
- Timon and Pumbaa
- Twist and Pulse, an English street dance duo
- Temperature and pressure, in engineering, particularly engine temperatures and pressures
- In education, particularly used for 'Tucht en Privacy'
