= Ebersberg Castle =

Coordinates: 48.9368°N 9.5310°E

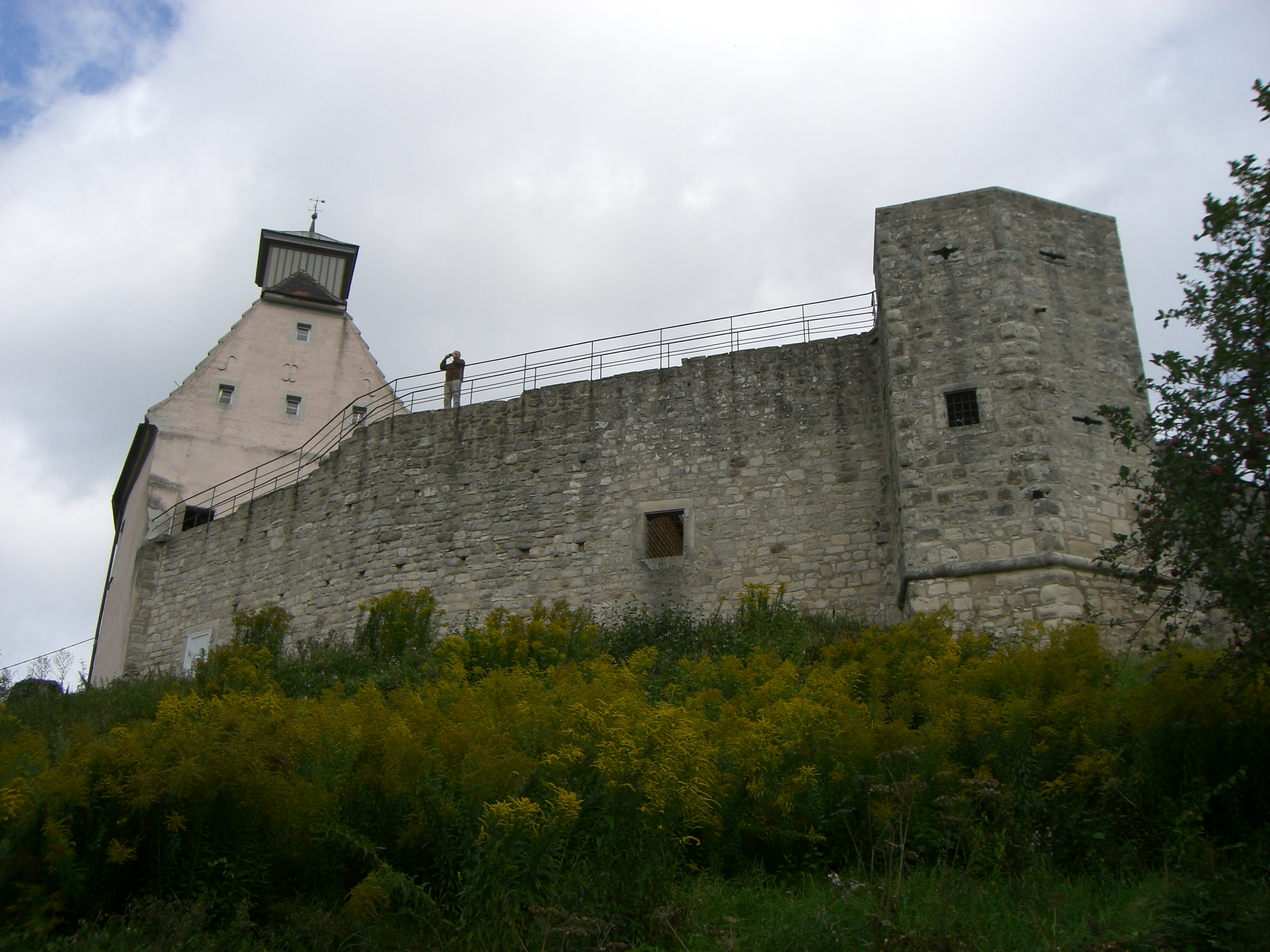
Schloss Ebersberg

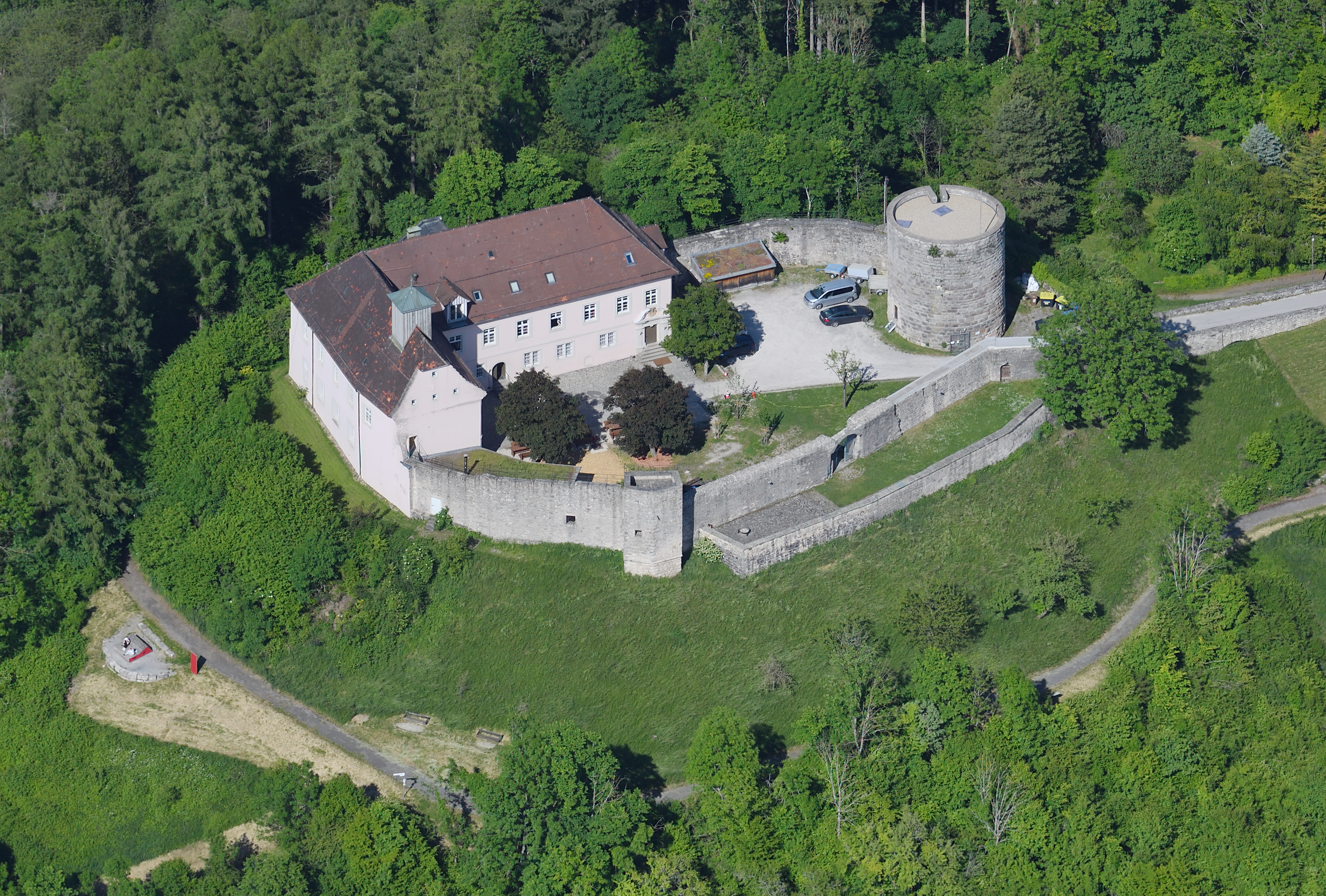
Aerial view

Ebersberg Castle (German: Schloss Ebersberg) is a schloss in Auenwald, Germany.

Construction of the castle began at the beginning of the 12th century; it was first mentioned in 1226. In 1714 a fire destroyed almost the entire Castle. The castle was rebuilt by the Cistercian monastery in Schöntal around 1720 after this devastating fire. In 2020 the castle was the location for the Identitarian movement. Tourism highlight is the highest "Mammutbaum" (Sequoioideae) of Germany.
