= Identitarian movement =

European far-right political movement

Lambda, the symbol of the Identitarian movement used primarily in Europe by Generation Identity and occasionally other countries, inspired by the ancient Battle of Thermopylae between Greeks and Persians

The Identitarian movement or Identitarianism is a pan-European nationalist, ethno-nationalist, far-right ideological movement centred on the preservation of white European identity, which it claims is under existential threat from multiculturalism, immigration, and globalisation. Originating in France in the 2000s as Bloc Identitaire (Identitarian Bloc), with its youth wing Generation Identity (GI), the movement later expanded to other European countries in the 2010s. Identitarian ideology takes its sources in the interwar Conservative Revolution and, more directly, in the Nouvelle Droite, a far-right political movement that appeared in France in the 1960s. Essayists Alain de Benoist, Dominique Venner, Pierre Vial, Guillaume Faye and Renaud Camus are considered the main ideological sources of the Identitarian movement.

Rooted in an anti-universalist, anti-globalist, anti-liberal, anti-Islam, and anti-multiculturalist worldview, the Identitarian movement sees ethnic, cultural, and racial identities as fundamental. It asserts that white Europeans face demographic and cultural extinction due to declining birth rates, extra-European immigration, and pro-diversity policies, a conspiracy theory that is known as the "Great Replacement". As a political solution to these perceived threats, Identitarians advocate for pan-European nationalism, localism, ethnopluralism, and remigration. They are opposed to cultural mixing and promote the preservation of homogeneous ethno-cultural entities, generally to the exclusion of extra-European migrants and descendants of immigrants, and may espouse ideas considered xenophobic and racialist. Influenced by New Right metapolitics, they do not seek direct electoral results, but rather to provoke long-term social transformations and eventually achieve cultural hegemony and popular adherence to their ideas.

The movement is most notable in Europe, and although rooted in Western Europe, it has spread more rapidly to the eastern part of the continent through conscious efforts of the likes of Faye. It also has adherents among white nationalists in North America, Australia, and New Zealand. The United States–based Southern Poverty Law Center considers many of these organisations to be hate groups, describing them as racist, exclusionary, and in favour of ethnic separatism for whites. In 2019, the Identitarian movement was classified by the German Federal Office for the Protection of the Constitution as right-wing extremist. In 2021, the French group Generation Identity was banned for racial incitement, violence, and paramilitary ties.

== Origin and development ==
The Identitarian ideology is generally believed by scholars to be derived from the Nouvelle Droite, a French far-right philosophical movement that was formed in the 1960s in order to adapt traditionalist conservative and illiberal politics to a post-WWII European context and to distance itself from earlier far-right ideologies like fascism and Nazism, mainly through a form of pan-European nationalism. The Nouvelle Droite opposes liberal democracy and capitalism, and is hostile to multiculturalism and the mixing of different cultures within a single society. Although it is not supremacist, it is racialist because it identifies Europeans as a race. Strategies and concepts promoted by Nouvelle Droite thinkers, such as ethnopluralism, localism, pan-European nationalism, and the use of metapolitics to influence public opinion, have shaped the ideological structure of the Identitarian movement.

=== Background ===
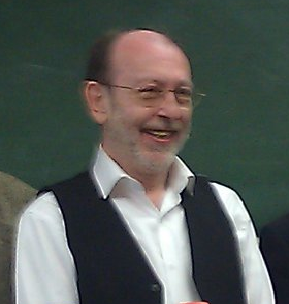
The ideas of Alain de Benoist and his Nouvelle Droite are often cited as influential on the Identitarian movement.

The Nouvelle Droite has widely been considered a neo-fascist attempt to legitimise far-right ideas in the political spectrum, and in some cases to recycle Nazi ideas. According to political scientist Stéphane François, the latter accusation, "though relevant in certain ways, [remains] incomplete, as it (purposely) [shuns] other references, most notably the primordial relationship to the German Conservative Revolution." The original prominence of the French nucleus gradually decreased, and a nebula of similar movements which were grouped under the term "European New Right" began to emerge across the continent. Among them was the Neue Rechte of Armin Mohler, also largely inspired by the Conservative Revolution, and another ideological source for the Identitarian movement. Martin Sellner, one of the biggest figures of the Identitarian movement, has been influenced by the theories of Martin Heidegger and Carl Schmitt. Leading Identitarian Daniel Friberg has likewise claimed influences from Ernst Jünger and Julius Evola.

Through their think tank GRECE, Nouvelle Droite figures Alain de Benoist and Guillaume Faye sought to imitate Marxist metapolitics, especially the tactics of cultural hegemony, agitprop and entryism, which they believed had enabled left-wing movements to achieve cultural and academic dominance from the mid-20th century onward. New Right ethnonationalist thinkers played a pivotal role in shaping Identitarian ideology, with figures such as Guillaume Faye, Pierre Vial, Dominique Venner, and Renaud Camus insisting on the promotion of homogeneous regional, national, pan-European, and white ethnic identities. Venner and his magazine Europe-Action, considered the "embryonic form" of the Nouvelle Droite, have been instrumental in redefining pan-European nationalism on the "white nation" rather than the "nation state". From the 1990s onward, Venner, Vial and Faye pushed for a stronger commitment to the Identitarian struggle, arguing that metapolitics alone was insufficient, and calling for a cultural revolution against multiculturalism, Islam, and globalism. In the 2000s, Camus and Faye introduced two of the movement's defining concepts: the Great Replacement and remigration.

According to scholar Imogen Richards, "while in many respects [Génération Identitaire] is characteristic of the 'European New Right' (ENR), its spokespersons' various promotion of capitalism and commodification, including through their advocacy of international trade and sale of merchandise, diverges from the anti-capitalist philosophizing of contemporary ENR thinkers."

=== Emergence ===
The neo-Völkisch movement Terre et Peuple, which was founded in 1995 by Nouvelle Droite writers Pierre Vial, Jean Haudry and Jean Mabire, is generally considered a precursor of the Identitarian movement. In the early 21st century, Nouvelle Droite ideas influenced far-right youth movements in France through groups such as Jeunesses Identitaires (founded in 2002 and succeeded by Génération Identitaire in 2012) and Bloc Identitaire (2003). After 2012, the French Identitarian movement expanded across Europe, spawning the creation of chapters, offshoots, and like-minded groups, eventually forming a loosely connected pan-European network. It also inspired movements in the United States, Canada, Australia, New Zealand, and even Chile.

According to Richards, the Syrian civil war (2011–2024), the subsequent European migration crisis (2015), growing economic globalisation, and escalating instability and terrorism in the Middle East and North Africa (spreading into Europe) created conditions that radical-right groups, including the Identitarian Movement, exploited by appealing to widespread anti-immigration and anti-Islam sentiments.

== Ideology ==
=== Definition ===
Identitarianism can be defined by its opposition to globalisation, multiculturalism, Islam and extra-European immigration; and by its defence of traditions, pan-European nationalism and cultural homogeneity within the nations of Europe. The concept of "identity" is central to the Identitarian movement, which sees, in the words of Guillaume Faye, "every form of [humanity's] homogenisation [as] synonymous with death, as well as sclerosis and entropy". Scholar Stéphane François has described the essence of Identitarian ideology as "mixophobic", that is the fear of ethnic mixing.

Building on this perspective, Tamir Bar-On defines the Identitarian worldview through several key elements. These include anti-universalism (rejecting liberal and left-wing perceived efforts to homogenise different peoples under a universal framework), the centrality of identity (viewing ethnic, cultural, and racial identities, particularly those of white Europeans, as fundamental and under threat), and demographic fears (centred on concerns over declining white birth rates, immigration, Islam, and multicultural policies, which are framed as leading to the so-called "Great Replacement"). Additionally, Identitarianism emphasises metapolitics and activism (combining ideological dissemination with direct action, including propaganda campaigns and political agitation), a call for radical solutions to alleged threats of white extinction (such as remigration, national preference in employment and welfare, and the "reconquest" of immigrant-dominated areas), and a civilisational struggle against non-Europeans (portraying white European identity as existentially threatened and drawing on historical narratives of Christian and Western achievements).

Philosopher Pierre-André Taguieff argues that the Identitarian 'party-movements' generally share the following traits: a call to an 'authentic' and 'sane' people, which a leader is claiming to embody, against illegitimate or unworthy elites; and a call for a purifying break with the supposedly 'corrupt' current system, in part achieved by 'cleaning up' the territory from elements perceived as 'non-assimilable' for cultural reasons, Muslims in particular.

Scholars have also described the essence of Identitarianism as a reaction against the permissive ideals of the '68 movement, embodied by the baby boomers and their perceived left-liberal dominance on society, which they sometimes label "Cultural Marxism". Bar-On notes that while Identitarian thinkers and the Nouvelle Droite criticise the liberal-left legacy of the May 1968 events, the Nouvelle Droite views the 1968 generation as a model to follow, precisely because they successfully "conquered" the media, academia, and other centres of intellectual influence.

=== Metapolitics ===
Inspired by the metapolitics of Marxist philosopher Antonio Gramsci via the Nouvelle Droite, Identitarians do not seek direct electoral results but rather to influence the wider political debate in society. Through education and counter-hegemonic narratives to challenge liberal multiculturalism and globalism, they seek to win the "war of ideas" by shifting public discourse on ethnic identity, immigration, and Islam, believing that a "silent majority" of white Europeans will eventually embrace their solutions. Identitarian theorist Guillaume Faye defines metapolitics as the "social diffusion of ideas and cultural values for the sake of provoking profound, long-term, political transformation".

In 2006, Swedish Identitarians launched Metapedia as an alternative encyclopedia to advance their New Right and Identitarian ideas and gain wider support. In 2009, Daniel Friberg established the publishing house Arktos Media, which has grown since that date into the "uncontested global leader in the publication of English-language Nouvelle Droite literature." Some Identitarian parties have nonetheless contested elections, as in France or in Croatia, but so far with no success. Éric Zemmour, who has been described as belonging to the Identitarian movement by some scholars, won 7.1% of the votes during the 2022 French presidential election.

A key strategy of the Identitarian movement is to generate large media attention by symbolically occupying popular public spaces, often with only a handful of militants. The largest action as of 2019, labelled "Defend Europe", occurred in 2017. After crowdsourcing more than $178,000, Identitarian militants chartered a ship in the Mediterranean Sea to ferry rescued migrants back to Africa, observe any incursions by other NGO ships into Libyan waters, and report them to the Libyan coastguard. In the event, the ship suffered an engine failure and had to be rescued by another ship from one of the NGOs rescuing migrants.

=== Ethnopluralism ===
According to ethnographer Benjamin R. Teitelbaum, Identitarians advocate "an ostensibly non-hierarchical global separatism to create a 'pluriversum', where differences among peoples are preserved and celebrated." Political scientist Jean-Yves Camus agrees and defines the movement as being centred around the Nouvelle Droite concept of ethnopluralism (or 'ethno-differentialism'): "each people and culture can only flourish on its territory of origin; ethnic and cultural mixing (métissage) is seen as a factor of decadence; multiculturalism as a pathogenic project, producing crime, loss of bearings and, ultimately, the possibility of an 'ethnic war' on European lands, between 'ethnic Europeans' and non-native Maghrebi Arabs, in any case Muslims." The European Identitarian movements often use a yellow lambda symbol on a black background, commemorating the ancient Battle of Thermopylae between Greeks and Persians. It symbolises a modern pan-European struggle against foreigners and Muslims, and non-Europeans in general.

The pairing of Muslim immigration and Islam with the concept of ethnopluralism is indeed one of the main bases of Identitarianism, and the prediction of a future ethnic war between whites and immigrants is central for Identitarian theorists. In their worldview, "ethno-masochism" (the hatred of one's own ethnicity) and xenophilia (the love of foreigners) contribute to a perceived "Great Replacement" of white Europeans, leading to an eventual risk of extinction. They claim that this alleged replacement can only be halted, and a potential civil war avoided, by ending pro-multicultural, pro-immigration, and pro-anti-racism policies. However, they doubt such steps will be taken because elites and the general public do not recognise the threat they warn about. In 2016 Guillaume Faye claimed that "the ethnic civil war, like a snake's baby that breaks the shell of its egg, [was] only in its very modest beginnings". He had earlier preached "total ethnic war" between "original" Europeans and Muslims in The Colonization of Europe in 2000, which earned him a criminal conviction for incitement to racial hatred. These calls to ethnic conflictual violence, also exemplified by Pierre Vial's incitement of a "war of liberation" against "ethnic colonisation", are however opposed by other Identitarian thinkers and groups. Alain de Benoist disavowed Faye's "strongly racist" ideas regarding Muslims after the publication of his 2000 book.

=== Pan-European nationalism ===
According to Identitarian thought, identity should be defended on three levels, local/regional, national, and civilisational, with the nation-state acting as an intermediate bridge between regional roots (in the sense of the German Heimat) and membership in European civilisation. Rejecting traditional far-right notions of Europe as merely a collection of nation-states, they imagine a "Europe of 100 Flags" as a mosaic of diverse regional communities united by the same civilisational heritage. They also reframe the concept "biodiversity" as the plurality of European cultures, arguing that in the face of the homogenising effects of global capitalism and unchecked immigration, protecting biodiversity means safeguarding the unique cultural identities of Europe's peoples through a commitment to localism.

Scholar Stéphane François argues that Identitarian geopolitics should be seen as a form of "ethnopolitics". In their vision, the world would be structured into different "ethnospheres", each dominated by ethnically related peoples. They promote ethnic solidarities between European peoples, and the establishment of a confederation of regional identities that would eventually replace the various nation states of Europe, which are seen as an inheritance from the "dubious philosophy of the French Revolution". While Identitarians generally dismiss the European Union as "corrupt" and "authoritarian", they also advocate for a "European-level political body that can hold its own against superpowers like America and China."

=== Views on Islam and liberalism ===
The movement is strongly opposed to the politics and philosophy of Islam, which some critics describe as disguised Islamophobia. Followers often protest what they see as the Islamisation of Europe through mass immigration, claiming it to be a threat to European culture and society. As summarised by Markus Willinger, a key activist of the movement, "We don't want Mehmed and Mustapha to become Europeans." This position is connected to the ideas of the Great Replacement, a conspiracy theory which claims that a global elite is colluding against the white population of Europe to replace them with non-European peoples. As a proposed solution to this debunked global conspiracy, the identitarians present mass remigration, a project of reversing growing multiculturalism through a forced mass deportation of non-European immigrants (often including their descendants) back to their supposed place of racial origin, regardless of their citizenship status. Génération Identitaire has made frequent use of the term Reconquista, in reference to the medieval Christian reconquest of the Iberian Peninsula from Muslim rule.

Identitarians do not share, however, a common vision on liberalism. Some regard it as a part of European identity "threatened by Muslims who do not respect women or gay people", whereas others like Daniel Friberg describe it as the "disease" that contributed to Muslim immigration in the first place.

=== Relationship to fascism and Nazism ===
Identitarians have been labelled as racist or fascist by political opponents, though there is debate among scholars about whether cultural nationalism constitutes "cultural racism".

Following Piero Ignazi's framework, Pierre-André Taguieff classifies the Identitarian 'party-movements' as a new "post-industrial" far-right, distinct from the "traditional" nostalgic far-right. Their ultimate goal is to enter mainstream politics, Taguieff argues, as "post-fascists rather than neo-fascists, [and as] post-nazis rather than neo-nazis." A 2014 investigation led by political scientist Gudrun Hentges came to the conclusion that the Identitarian movement is ideologically situated between the French National Front, the Nouvelle Droite, and neo-Nazism. According to Tamir Bar-On, Identitarianism sets itself apart from fascism, Nazism, traditional racism, white supremacism, and imperialism, yet remains outside the mainstream conservative spectrum. He describes it as a "fourth way" that rejects the Old Right's embrace of violence, the Nouvelle Droite's purely intellectual approach, and the conventional radical right's focus on immediate parliamentary power. At the same time, Bar-On notes that some Identitarian leaders, including Fabrice Robert, the founder of Bloc Identitaire, and Martin Sellner, had a past linked to neo-fascist or neo-Nazi activity. In 2019, political scientist Cas Mudde wrote that although Identitarians claim to share the slogan "0% racism, 100% identity" and officially subscribe to ethnopluralism, "the boundaries between biological and cultural arguments in the movement have become increasingly porous".

Scholar A. James McAdams has described the Identitarian movement as a "second generation" in the evolution of European far-right foundational critique of liberal democracy during the post-war era: "the first of these generations, congregated around the members of the French Nouvelle Droite (New Right), defined difference as a right ('a right to difference') to which all persons were entitled by virtue of their shared humanity. A second generation, epitomized by the pan-European Identitarian movement of the early 2000s, replaced the language of rights with the less exacting claim to respect the differences of others, especially those based on ethnicity. Finally, in response to the degeneration of Identitarian thinking into outright xenophobia and racism, a third generation of theorists emerged in the 2010s with the expressed aim of restoring the respectability of far-right thought."

== Connection to other far-right groups ==
The movement has been described as being a part of the global alt-right, or as the European counterpart of the American alt-right. Hope not Hate (HNH) has described Identitarianism and the alt-right as "ostensibly separate" in origin, but with "huge areas of ideological crossover". Many white nationalists and alt-right leaders have described themselves as Identitarians, and according to HNH, American alt-right influence is evident in European Identitarian groups and events, forming an amalgamated "International Alternative Right". Figures within the Identitarian movements and alt-right often cite Nouvelle Droite founder Alain de Benoist as an influence. De Benoist rejects any alt-right affiliation, although he has worked with Richard B. Spencer, and once spoke at Spencer's National Policy Institute. As Benoist stated, "Maybe people consider me their spiritual father, but I don't consider them my spiritual sons".

According to Christoph Gurk of Bayerischer Rundfunk, one of the goals of Identitarianism is to make racism modern and fashionable. Austrian Identitarians invited radical right-wing groups from across Europe, including several neo-Nazi groups, to participate in an anti-immigration march, according to Anna Thalhammer of Die Presse. There has also been Identitarian collaboration with the white nationalist activist Tomislav Sunić.

== By location ==
=== Austria ===
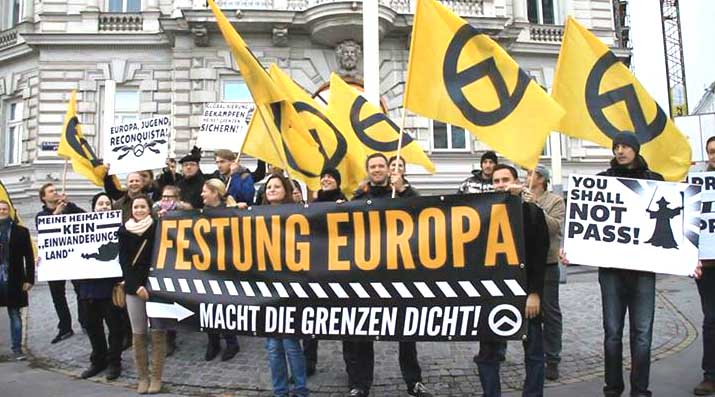
Austrian Identitarians demonstrating in Vienna

The Identitäre Bewegung Österreich (IBÖ) was founded in 2012. They have sometimes used the concept of a "War Against the '68ers"; i.e. people whose political identities are seen by Identitarians as stemming from the social changes of the 1960s, what would be called baby boomer liberals in the US.

On 27 April 2018 the IBÖ and the homes of its leaders were searched by the Austrian police, and investigations were started against Sellner on suspicion that a criminal organisation was being formed. The court later ruled that the IBÖ was not a criminal organisation.

=== France ===
The main Identitarian youth movement is Génération Identitaire in France, originally a youth wing of Bloc Identitaire before it split off in 2012 to become its own organisation. The association Terre et Peuple ("Land and People"), which represents the Völkisch leaning of the Nouvelle Droite, is seen as a precursor of the Identitarian movement. Political scientist Stéphane François estimated the size of the Identitarian movement in France to be 1,500–2,000 in 2017.

An undercover investigation conducted by Al Jazeera Investigates into the French branch, which aired on 10 December 2018, captured GI activists punching a Muslim woman whilst saying "Fuck Mecca" and one saying if ever he gets a terminal illness he will purchase a weapon and cause carnage. When asked by the undercover journalist who would be the target he replies "a mosque, whatever". French prosecutors have launched an inquiry into the findings amidst calls for the group to be proscribed.

Collectif Némésis, a feminist and Identitarian organisation founded in 2019, believes in a connection between immigration and crime, and that non-Europeans present an elevated risk of violence towards women.

Génération Identitaire was banned by French authorities in March 2021 for racial incitement, violence, and paramilitary ties.

=== Germany ===
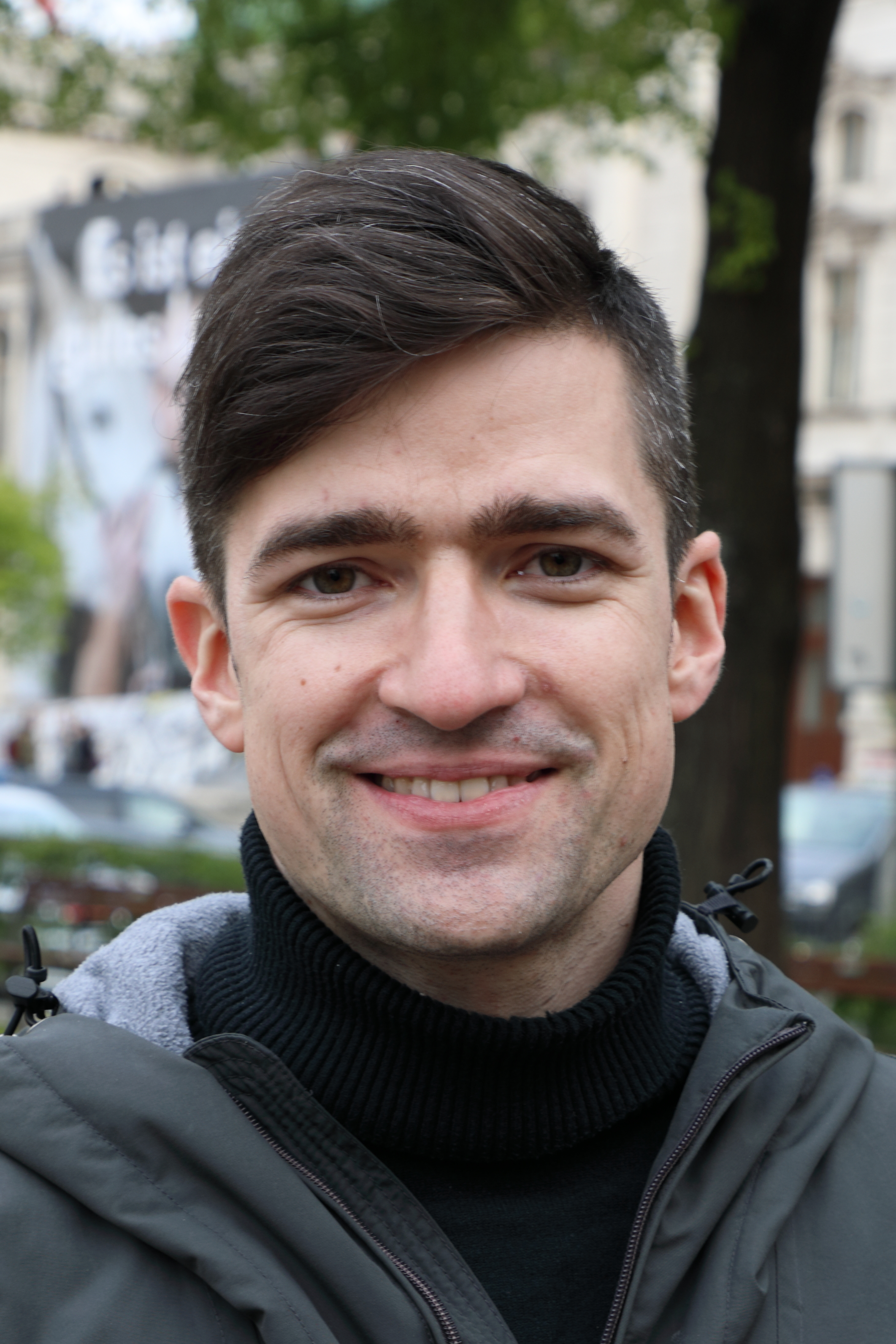
Martin Sellner (2019)

The movement also appeared in Germany and converged with preexisting circles, centred on the magazine Blue Narcissus (Blaue Narzisse) and its founder Felix Menzel, a martial artist and former German Karate Team Champion, who according to Gudrun Hentges – who worked for the official Federal Agency for Civic Education – belongs to the "elite of the movement". It became a "registered association" in 2014. Drawing upon thinkers of the Nouvelle Droite and the Conservative Revolution such as Oswald Spengler, Carl Schmitt or the contemporary Russian fascist Aleksandr Dugin, it played a role in the rise of the Pegida marches in 2014–15.

The Identitarian movement has a close linkage to members of the German New Right, e.g., to its prominent member Götz Kubitschek and his journal Sezession, for which the Identitarian speaker Martin Sellner writes.

In August 2016 members of the Identitarian movement in Germany scaled the iconic Brandenburg Gate in Berlin and hung a banner in protest at European immigration and perceived spread of Islam. In September of the same year, members of the Identitarian movement erected a new summit cross in a "provocative" act (as the Süddeutsche Zeitung reported) on the Schafreuter, after the original one had to be removed because of damage by an unknown person.

In June 2017, the PayPal donations account of the Identitarian "Defend Europe" was locked, and the Identitarian account of the bank Steiermärkische Sparkasse was closed.

On 11 July 2019, Germany's Federal Office for the Protection of the Constitution (BfV), the country's domestic intelligence agency, formally designated the Identitarian Movement as "a verified extreme right movement against the liberal democratic constitution". The new classification has allowed the BfV to use more powerful surveillance methods against the group and its youth wing, Generation Identity. The Identitarian Movement has about 600 members in Germany. As of January 2024 South west Germany alone had about 100 members, mostly in Ulm, Reutlingen, Pforzheim and Stuttgart with 2.400 followers on instagram; the group changed its original name from Identitäre Bewegung Schwaben to 'Kesselrevolte/Schwaben Bande' to 'Wackre Schwaben' to 'Reconquista 21'.

=== United Kingdom ===
In July 2017, a Facebook page for Generation Identity UK and Ireland was created. A few months later, in October 2017, key figures of the Identitarian movement met in London in efforts to target the United Kingdom, and discussed the founding of a British chapter as a "bridge" to link with radical movements in the US. Their discussions resulted in a new British chapter being officially launched in late October 2017 with Tom Dupre and Ben Jones as its co-founders, after a banner was unfurled on Westminster Bridge reading "Defend London, Stop Islamisation".

On 9 March 2018, Sellner and his girlfriend Brittany Pettibone were barred from entering the UK because their presence was "not conducive to the public good".

Prior to the ban, Sellner intended to deliver a speech to the Young Independence party, though they cancelled the event, citing supposed threats of violence from the far-left. Prior to being detained and deported, Sellner intended to deliver his speech at Speakers' Corner in Hyde Park. In June 2018 Tore Rasmussen, a Norwegian activist who had previously been denied entry to the United Kingdom, was working in Ireland to establish a local branch of Generation Identity.

In August 2018, the leader of GI UK Tom Dupre resigned from his position after UK press revealed Rasmussen, who was a senior member in the UK branch, had an active past in neo-Nazi movements within Norway.

Generation Identity UK has been conferencing with other organisations, namely Identity Evropa/American Identity Movement. Identity Evropa/American Identity Movement is known for its involvement in the deadly 11–12 August 2017 Unite the Right rally in Charlottesville, Virginia, United States and its antisemitism. Jacob Bewick, an activist with GI, had been exposed as a member of proscribed terror organisation National Action and was spotted at an NA march in 2016. At an after conference event, one GI UK member told a Hope not Hate informant that two members of the fascist National Front (and former NA members) were present.

The UK branch was condemned by the wider European movement on Twitter when it held its second annual conference and had invited numerous controversial alt-right speakers. Speaking alongside the UK's new leader Ben Jones was alt-right YouTuber Millennial Woes and Nouvelle Droite writer Tomislav Sunić.

This controversy led to a number of members leaving the organisation in disgust at what they perceived to be a shift towards the "Old Right". This led to concern that the British version may become more radicalised and dangerous. Simon Murdoch, Identitarianism researcher at Hope not Hate, said: "Evidence suggests we will be left with a smaller but more toxic group in the UK, open to engagement with the more antisemitic, extreme and thus dangerous elements of the domestic far-right."

According to Unite Against Fascism, the Identitarian Movement in the UK is estimated to have a membership of less than 200 activists as of June 2019.

=== Scandinavia ===
In Sweden, the organisation Nordiska förbundet (active from 2004 to 2010), which founded the online encyclopedia Metapedia in 2006, promoted Identitarianism.

The influence of Identitarian theories has been noted in the Sweden Democrats' slogan "We are also a people!".

=== Other European groups ===
The origin of the Italian chapter Generazione Identitaria dates from 2012.

The founder of the far-right Croatian party Generation of Renovation has stated that it was originally formed in 2017 as that country's version of the alt-right and Identitarian movements.

The separatist party Som Catalans claims to defend the "identity of Catalonia" against "Spanish colonialism and the migrant invasion", as well as the "islamisation" of the Spanish autonomous community. Similar stances are also found in Spanish nationalist parties, such as Identitarios, which align themselves with the European Identity and Democracy Party.

In Belgium, in 2018, the State Security Service saw the rise of Schild & Vrienden in the context of Identitarian groups emerging throughout Europe. A Europol terror report mentioned Soldaten van Odin and the defunct group La Meute.

In the Netherlands, Identitair Verzet was founded in 2012. Its main goal is "preservation of the national identity". Training their members at camps in France, their protests in the Netherlands attract tens of participants.

In Flanders, Voorpost is an ethnic nationalist (volksnationalist) group founded by Karel Dillen in 1976 as a splinter from the People's Union. Voorpost pursues an irredentist ideal of a Greater Netherlands, a nation state that would unite all Dutch-speaking territories in Europe. The organisation has staged rallies on various topics, against Islam and mosques, against leftist organisations, against drugs, against paedophilia, and against socialism.

The Hungarian chapter, Identitesz, merged into Force and Determination in 2017.

== Non-European affiliates ==
=== Australasia ===
There was a small group in Australia called Identity Australia around March 2019, which described itself as "a youth-focused identitiarian organisation dedicated to giving European Australians a voice and restoring Australia's European character", and published a manifesto detailing its beliefs, but its website is as of April 2021 non-operational.

The Dingoes are an Australian group who were described in a 2016 news report as "young, educated and alternative right", and were compared to the Identitarian movement in Europe. Members do not reveal their identity. National Party MP George Christensen and One Nation candidate Mike Latham were both interviewed on the Dingoes podcast, called The Convict Report, but Christensen later said that he would not have done it if he had known about their extremist views. The podcast also featured a New Zealand man who ran the Dominion Movement, who was later arrested for sharing information that threatened NZ security.

New Zealand had hosted the Dominion Movement, which labelled itself as "a grass-roots Identitarian activist organisation committed to the revitalisation of our country and our people: white New Zealanders". The website for the group shut down alongside New Zealand National Front in the aftermath of the Christchurch mosque shootings in March 2019. In late 2019, the Dominion Movement was largely replaced by a similar white supremacist group called Action Zealandia, after its co-founder and leader, a New Zealand soldier, was arrested for sharing information that threatened NZ security.

Australian Brenton Harrison Tarrant, the perpetrator of the Christchurch mosque shootings in New Zealand, was a believer in the Great Replacement conspiracy theory, named his manifesto after it, and donated €1,500 to Austrian Identitarian leader Martin Sellner of Identitäre Bewegung Österreich (IBÖ) a year prior to the terror attacks. An investigation into the potential links between Tarrant and IBÖ was conducted by then Austrian Minister of the Interior Herbert Kickl. Other than the donation, no other evidence of contact or connections between the two parties has been found. At the time, the Austrian government was considering dissolving the group. The shooter also donated €2,200 to Génération Identitaire, the French branch of the Generation Identity. Tarrant exchanged emails with Sellner with one asking if they could meet for coffee or beer in Vienna and sent him a link to his YouTube channel. This was confirmed by Sellner, but he denied interacting with Tarrant in person or knowing of his plans. The Austrian government later opened an investigation into Sellner over suspected formation of a terrorist group with Tarrant and the former's fiancée Brittany Pettibone who met Australian far-right figure Blair Cottrell.

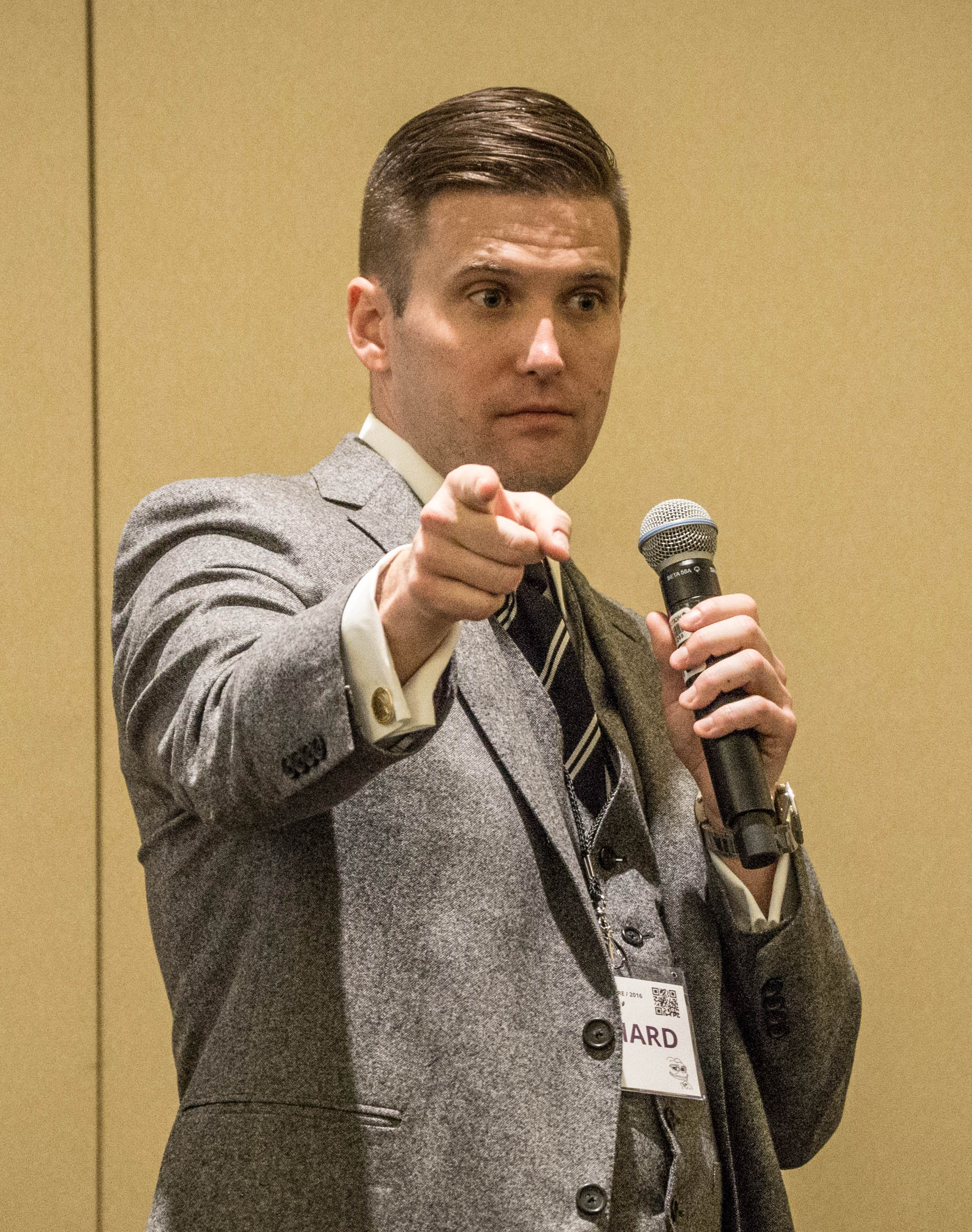
Richard B. Spencer identifies himself as a leading member of the American Identitarian movement.

=== North America ===
==== Canada ====
The Canadian organisation Generation Identity Canada was formed in 2014, and was renamed IDCanada in 2017. The organisation has distributed material across the country, such as in Hamilton, Ontario, Saskatoon, Peterborough, Ontario, Prince Edward Island, Alberta, and in Quebec.

La Meute (French for "The Pack") is a Québécois nationalist pressure group and identitarian movement fighting against illegal immigration and radical Islam. The group was founded in September 2015 in Quebec by two former Canadian Armed Forces members, Éric Venne and Patrick Beaudry, both of whom have left the group. La Meute announced it would prefer "to become large enough and organized enough to constitute a force that can't be ignored". The group has been attacked by anti-fascists in Montreal. A parallel protest encampment was set up in Gatineau, Quebec, during the larger Canada convoy protests in Ottawa. Steeve Charland of Grenville, Quebec, was arrested and charged in relation to the protests. Charland was reported as one of the leaders of La Meute in opposition to Canada's decision to open its borders to Syrian refugees. During the "Freedom Convoy" protests in Ottawa, Steeve Charland acted as the leader and spokesperson for the Farfadaas, a group that opposes COVID-19 health measures and whose members are recognisable by their leather vests marked with an expletive hand gesture.

==== United States ====
Identity Evropa (now known as American Identity Movement) is a part of the American Identitarian movement.

The now-defunct neo-Nazi Traditionalist Worker Party was modelled after the European Identitarian movement, according to the Southern Poverty Law Center and the Anti-Defamation League. Identity Evropa and its successor the American Identity Movement in the United States labels itself Identitarian, and is part of the alt-right. Richard Spencer's National Policy Institute is also a white nationalist movement, which advocates an American version of Identitarianism called "American Identitarianism". The SPLC also reports that the Southern California-based Rise Above Movement "is inspired by Identitarian movements in Europe and is trying to bring the philosophies and violent tactics to the United States".

On 20 May 2017, two non-commissioned officers with the U.S. Marines were arrested for trespassing after displaying a banner from a building in Graham, North Carolina, during a Confederate Memorial Day event. The banner included the Identitarian logo, and the phrase "he who controls the past controls the future", a reference to George Orwell's novel Nineteen Eighty-Four, along with the initialism YWNRU, or "you will not replace us". The Marine Corps denounced the behaviour and investigated the incident. A marine spokesperson commented to local news: "Of course we condemn this type of behavior ... we condemn any type of behavior that is not congruent with our values or that is illegal." Both men pleaded guilty to trespassing. One received military administrative punishment. The other was discharged from the corps.

== See also ==
- Eurabia – Far-right Islamophobic conspiracy theory
- Ghost skin – White supremacist skinhead subculture
- Great Replacement – Conspiracy theory about race and culture
- Identity Catholicism
- Identity politics – Politics based on one's identity
- Nativism – Policy of protecting the interests of established inhabitants against those of immigrants
- Remigration – Forced or promoted return of non-European immigrants
- White nationalism – Ideology that seeks to develop a white national identity
