= Jean-Gilles Malliarakis =

French politician and writer (1944–2025)

Jean-Gilles Malliarakis (22 June 1944 – 7 December 2025) was a French far-right politician and writer.

== Life and career ==
=== Early far-right activism ===
Jean-Gilles Malliarakis was the son of Greek painter 'Mayo' (Antoine Malliarakis) and of a French mother. He grew up in an intellectual, artistic background, as his father was a friend of Jacques Prévert and Albert Camus. He said that he became strongly anti-communist at the age of 15 after seeing the play The Possessed (in French Les Possédés), written by Albert Camus in 1959, based on Dostoevsky's Demons. While still a teenager, he began frequenting far-right groups. Malliarakis became close to Action française and Jeune Nation, and eventually joined the student movement Occident in 1964, alongside French political figures such as future government members Alain Madelin, Gérard Longuet, Patrick Devedjian and future National Front executive François Duprat. He eventually stopped frequenting Occident in 1966 and was formally expelled from the group the next year.

Whilst a student at Sciences Po, he created his own movement, Action nationaliste, which was classified as neofascist. In 1969, he organized a meeting at Sciences Po celebrating the 50th anniversary of the Fasci Italiani di Combattimento's founding by Mussolini. In May of that year, he was arrested after a left-wing student was grievously wounded during a fight between student activist groups. Malliarakis, who had been knocked out during the fight, was found unconscious by police forces and put in detention. He was eventually freed three weeks later.

In 1970, he took part in the founding meeting of the neo-fascist group Ordre Nouveau. Afterwards, he left frontline politics for a few years, and resurfaced a few years later in the mid-1970s when he bought the bookstore owned by far-right journalist Henry Coston and his wife. His shop, the "Librairie française", became a notorious venue for the radical right in Paris. At the same time, he joined the Groupe action jeunesse (GAJ), a movement which advocated solidarist and anticapitalist positions and a "third way" between communism and capitalism. In 1979, the GAJ was renamed Mouvement nationaliste révolutionnaire (MNR). Malliarakis advocated at that time "national revolutionary" positions. Historian Pierre Milza described his positions as somewhat similar to Mussolini's early left-wing fascism and Georges Valois's interwar Faisceau.

=== Troisième Voie ===
In 1982, Malliarakis attempted to create a coalition with other far-right groups such as Pierre Sidos's L'Œuvre Française, but the alliance was short-lived. He also tried to form an alliance with the GRECE, which held joined meeting with Malliarakis's MNR in 1984, but this attempt was fruitless. An alliance with the Groupe Union Défense (GUD) was equally short-lived. With the support of GRECE and the GUD, Malliariakis announced in the autumn of 1985 the creation of Troisième Voie ('Third Way') from the merger of the MNR and the Party of New Forces. The Jeune Garde (Young Guard) was portrayed as a third group, although it was actually a branch of the MNR. During the 1980s, Malliarakis also started working for the neo-Poujadist syndicate Confédération de défense des commerçants et artisans, and became a speaker at the right-wing station Radio Courtoisie.

In 1991, the Troisième Voie movement split after a conflict with Christian Bouchet's tendency. Malliarakis later dissolved what was left of the movement and retired from front-line politics to concentrate on his work at Radio Courtoisie and to his activity as a book publisher under the imprint Éditions du Trident. He eventually adopted neo-liberal positions and joined Alain Madelin's Idées action movement. In February 2007, after the death of station founder Jean Ferré, he left Radio Courtoisie after a disagreement with the policies of the radio's new director Henry de Lesquen. He later continued his activity as book publisher and as an online politics commentator. He also worked for the anticommunist think tank Institut d'histoire sociale.

== Death ==
Malliarakis died on 7 December 2025, at the age of 81.

== Works ==
- Yalta et la naissance des blocs, Albatros (1982).
- Ni trust ni soviets, Paris, La Librairie française-Le Trident, 458 p. (1985).
- L'Éditeur emprisonné, avec Franco Freda, La Librairie française (1985).
- Le Livre noir des retraites, Le Trident (1997).
- La Droite la plus suicidaire du monde, Le Trident (1998).
- L'histoire recommence toujours, Le Trident (1998).
- La Question turque et l'Europe, Le Trident (2009).
- L'Alliance Staline-Hitler, 1939-1941, Le Trident (2011).
- Pour une libération fiscale, Le Trident (2012).
- La Faucille et le Croissant : islam et bolchevisme au congrès de Bakou, Le Trident (2015).

== Bibliography ==
- Camus, Jean-Yves; Monzat, René (1992). Les Droites nationales et radicales en France : répertoire critique. Lyon (France): Presses Universitaires de Lyon. ISBN 2-7297-0416-7. OCLC 26152351.
- Camus, Jean-Yves; Lebourg, Nicolas (2017). Far-Right Politics in Europe. Harvard University Press. ISBN 9780674971530.
- Charpier, Frédéric (2005). Génération Occident (in French). Le Seuil. ISBN 978-2020614139.
- D'Appollonia, Ariane Chebel (1998). L'extrême-droite en France: De Maurras à Le Pen (in French). Editions Complexe. ISBN 978-2870277645.
- Gautier, Jean-Paul (2017). Les extrêmes droites en France: De 1945 à nos jours (in French). Syllepse. ISBN 978-2849505700.
- Milza, Pierre (2002). L'Europe en chemise noire: Les extrêmes droites européennes de 1945 à aujourd'hui (in French). Fayard. ISBN 9782213651064.
