= Terre et Peuple =

French neo-pagan association

- Abbreviation: T&P; TP
- Formation: 1994; 32 years ago
- Founder: Pierre Vial
- Type: Cultural association
- Purpose: "Identitarian cultural combat"
- Members: 700 (2014)
- Leader: Pierre Vial
- Website: http://www.terreetpeuple.com/

Terre et Peuple ('Land and People'; abbreviated T&P or TP) is a far-right and neo-pagan cultural association in France founded by Pierre Vial and launched in 1995. Its positions are close to the Identitarian movement, although it precedes that movement and its terminology.

== History ==
=== Background ===
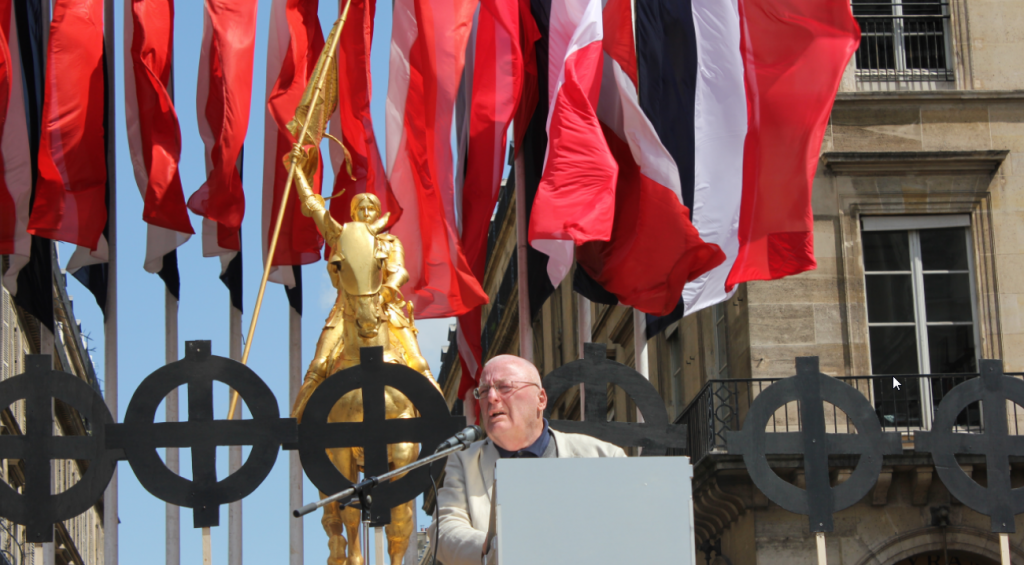
Pierre Vial at a Terre et Peuple event in 2012

Pierre Vial (born 1942) is an academic medievalist tied to the Jean Moulin University Lyon 3. He had been involved in far-right political activism since the 1960s: Vial co-founded the Nouvelle Droite organization Groupement de recherche et d'études pour la civilisation européenne (GRECE) in 1968, and served as the secretary general from 1978 to 1984. He represents a neopagan outlook in the vein of Marc "Saint-Loup" Augier. In 1988 Vial became a member of the Front National (FN) where he joined the leadership ranks.

=== Creation ===
Vial had been complaining about the lack of focus on the ethnic dimension of identity in both GRECE and the FN, and eventually decided to establish his own movement. Helped by former GRECE members Jean Mabire and Jean Haudry, he founded the cultural association Terre et Peuple (T&P) in 1994 and launched it publicly in 1995. According to the political scientists Jean-Yves Camus and Nicolas Lebourg, T&P could originally be understood as an externalization of the racialist faction of GRECE, which thereby could make more extravagant claims about ethnic civil war in Europe.

Camus and Lebourg also tie the roots of T&P to the neopagan tendency within the FN, and trace this tendency to the days of the FN co-founder François Duprat (1940–1978). Although he was an atheist with no sympathy for pagan revivalism, Duprat had clashed with the party's Traditionalist Catholic faction due to his conception of the nation, which was understood by the Catholics to be pagan. When Vial joined the FN, he became responsible for organizing the faction of the party that held views similar to those of Duprat.

=== Recent developments ===
The ties between T&P and the FN were weakened in 1998 when Vial's faction sided with Bruno Mégret and his failed attempt to take over the party. After this T&P became linked with Mégret's new party, the National Republican Movement. This connection was in turn broken after the September 11 attacks in 2001, when Mégret began to portray himself as a defender of the Jews against Muslims.

T&P have since established international branches in Belgium, Spain (Tierra y Pueblo), Portugal (Terra et Povo) and Italy (Terra Insubre). Since 2013 it has participated in the Switzerland-based network Action Européenne, labeled by Camus and Lebourg as a neo-Nazi network.

On February 14, 2023, the Global Project Against Hate and Extremism (GPAHE) released a report in which it classified Terre et Peuple as a "white nationalist" and "anti-immigrant" group.

== Activity and membership ==
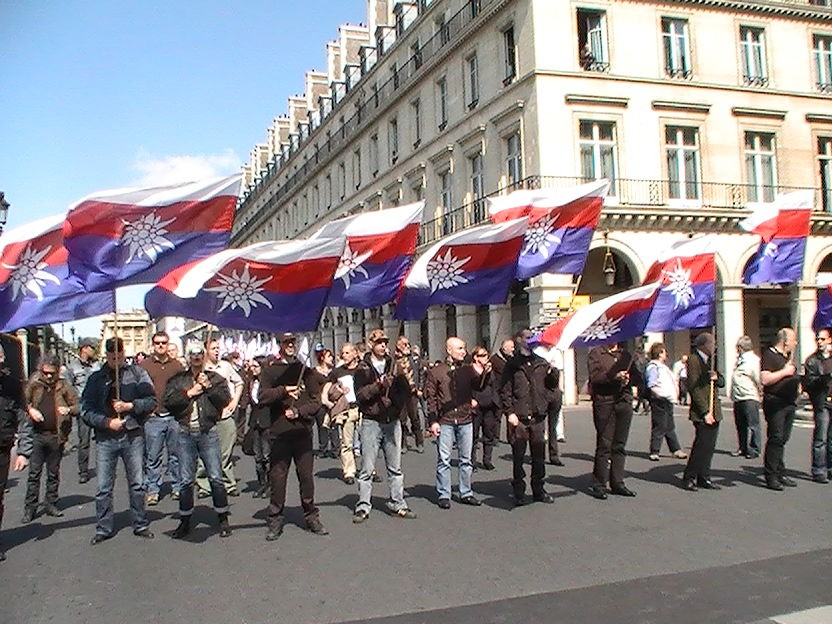
Terre et Peuple activists in Paris

T&P organize annual roundtables, participate at conferences and publish an eponymous quarterly magazine, subtitled résistance identitaire européenne (European identitarian resistance). Unlike Alain de Benoist and Charles Champetier of GRECE, T&P have been receptive to Guillaume Faye's adaptation of the Clash of Civilizations hypothesis and its focus on physical conflict. Vial announced in an editorial that the group's core principle is the "Identitarian cultural combat". To him, the cohabitation of two communities in one area could only lead to violence. "Ethnic conflicts, which have existed, will always exist", he said, the Identitarian goal then becomes to culturally arm the people "for the resistance, and then for the war of liberation which will allow it to survive and take command of its destiny." He has associated his group with the historical German völkisch movement, writing in the magazine that "the German word völkisch describes perfectly the doctrine of Terre et Peuple".

Vial rejects the term "neopaganism", as he does not perceive T&P's religious practices as new. This has been disputed by Stéphane François, a historian of ideas, who views the paganism of the organization as "a reinvention of a religion that never existed in this way". François describes T&P's paganism as something that has grown out of intellectual considerations rather than an immediate religiosity. It belongs to a current that began in the 20th century, which approaches paganism on a nationalist or regionalist basis. François does however set T&P apart from neo-Nazis and other far-right neopagan currents that can be prone to violence.

In 2014, Le Monde des Religions reported that the organization had more than 700 members.
