= Radical Network =

Radical Network (French: Réseau radical was a French far-right study group from 2002 to 2006. Formed in June 2002, a number of its early members came from those who split from Unité Radicale that April, notably Christian Bouchet, Luc Bignot and Giorgio Damiani.

Adhering to solidarism, the group avowedly rejected Left-Right politics and claimed to be inspired not only by rightists like Aleksandr Dugin, François Duprat, Julius Evola and Jean-François Thiriart but also by socialists such as Louis Auguste Blanqui. It used the trident as its emblem and also organised a youth movement, Jeune dissidence. In keeping with their status as a study group it numbered around 40 hardcore activists.

With their activities co-ordinated by a Conseil solidariste radical, it adopted a position of Anti-Americanism, Anti-capitalism and Anti-Zionism, whilst leaning towards the ideas of Neo-Eurasianism. In keeping with such ideas, it supported Saddam Hussein, Serbia and Montenegro, Carlos the Jackal and Hugo Chávez, amongst others. It was close to the magazine Résistance, a National Bolshevik publication produced by sometime member Bouchet.

The group was dissolved by its creators in early 2006, with some regrouping as Les nôtres.
