= Légion 88 =

French Neo-Nazi rock band

- Origin: Essonne, France
- Genre: Rock Against Communism
- Years active: 1984–1988
- Labels: Rebelles Européens, White League, Street Fighting Records
- Past members: Alain Pérez; Jean; Dominique Laffont; Fred Wartner; Vico; Jean-Christophe "Géno" Mâm

Légion 88 was a French Rock Against Communism (RAC) band from Essonne, formed in 1984 and disbanded in 1988. It is regarded as one of the most emblematic bands of the skinhead movement and of the French far-right.

== History ==
Légion 88 was formed in 1984. In France, as elsewhere, it became an emblematic band for skinhead movements, and more broadly among young activists of the French far-right.

The band's first singer, Jean-Christophe "Géno" Mâm, of Cambodian origin, first founded L'Infanterie Sauvage, a band which the Communist magazine Regards described as a "proletarian punk-rock" act, and which it compared at the time to Suprême NTM for the nature of its rebellion. Géno then founded the band Totenkopf, several of whose members later joined Légion 88. Géno was arrested in March 1986 for attacking a French Communist Party office in Livry-Gargan, Seine-Saint-Denis. He later died by drowning. He was replaced by Alain Pérez. Pérez, along with Légion 88 members Fred Wartner and Dominique Laffont, were at one point associated with the music scene of the French and European Nationalist Party. Alain Pérez left Légion 88 for the hardcore band Short Cut, and later Tribal Zone. Légion 88 disbanded in 1988.

== Legacy ==
In 2006, a tribute compilation, Tribute to Légion 88, was released by Street Fighting Records as a double CD, featuring numerous bands; some tracks, including "Légion blanche" and "Vaincre", were covered by several different acts. The album Thulé has been reissued at least nine times, though the number of copies produced remains limited. Several Légion 88 songs have been covered by later RAC bands, such as Jeune Garde, Lemovice, Division Skinhead, and Fraction.

== Members ==
- Alain Pérez – vocals
- Jean – guitar
- Dominique Laffont (Domi) – guitar
- Fred Mougin – bass
- Vico – drums

== Discography ==
=== Studio album ===
- 1988: Thulé (Rebelles Européens)

=== Singles and EPs ===
- 1987: Terroristes (Rebelles Européens)
- 1991: Légion Blanche (Rebelles Européens)
- 1999: Live (split 7" with Open Season, White League)

=== Compilations ===
- 1987: Debout! Vol. 1 (sampler with Bunker 84 and Skin-Korps)
- 1998: The Best of (Charlemagne Records)
- 2009: Légion Française (Septentrion)
- 2010: Icebreaker 1985 (When Typhoid Courtney Drops)

=== Tribute album ===
- 2006: Tribute to Legion 88 (2CD, Street Fighting Records)

== Bibliography ==
- Beauguitte, Laurent (2025). "Le Rock Against Communism en France (1984-2024). De la fabrique à la marginalisation d'une sous-culture musicale radicale". Transposition (in French) (13). doi:10.4000/15b07. ISSN 2110-6134.
- Leclercq, Jacques (2008). Dictionnaire de la mouvance droitiste et nationale, de 1945 à nos jours (in French). Paris: L'Harmattan. ISBN 978-2-296-06476-8.
