= Third Position =

Neo-fascist political ideologies

The Third Position refers to neo-fascist political ideologies that were first described in Western Europe following the Second World War. Developed in the context of the Cold War, it developed its name through the claim that it represented a third position between the capitalism of the Western Bloc and the communism of the Eastern Bloc.

== History and ideology ==
The term "Third Position" was coined in Europe during the Cold War as an umbrella term for neo-fascist and nationalist syncretic ideologies, mostly those descended from Italian fascism and other, primarily but not exclusively non-Hitlerite, fascist movements. These ideologies were generally united in their rejection of both Western Bloc capitalism and liberal democracy as well as Eastern Bloc Marxist communism, instead wishing to establish a third ideological force on the world stage, hence its name. Third Positionist ideologies also generally had in common the wish to overthrow existing governments to replace them with homogeneous states, either as independent nation states or within the context of a larger pan-European nationalism as espoused by Oswald Mosley's Europe a Nation idea. Economically, most Third Positionist ideologies, like their predecessors, advocated for a form of corporatism or national syndicalism. Third Positionist groups and ideologues cooperated with the Libyan regime under Muammar Gaddafi and were generally sympathetic towards national liberation movements in the Third World. Some Third Positionists, like Francis Parker Yockey, Otto Ernst Remer, and H. Keith Thompson; advocated for an alliance between communists and fascists called the red-brown alliance.

During its height in the Cold War, Third Positionists established various pan-European political groupings including but not limited to: the National Party of Europe and the European Social Movement of Oswald Mosley, the European Liberation Front of Francis Parker Yockey, the New European Order of René Binet and Gaston-Armand Amaudruz, and the International Third Position of Roberto Fiore. Fiore has also since its foundation served as the leader of the Alliance for Peace and Freedom, a modern Third Positionist alliance.

Groups and individuals that associate themselves with the Third Position still exist in modern Europe, but their influence has declined since the end of the Cold War.

Third Positionist ideology has at times influenced the European New Right in both France (Nouvelle Droite) and Germany (Neue Rechte).

== Germany ==
After World War II, the German far-right primarily consisted of the Socialist Reich Party (SRP), led by Otto Ernst Remer, which directly attempted to revive the just defeated Nazism. The SRP was however later brought under the influence of Francis Parker Yockey who had, in his book Imperium, developed more unorthodox ideas for the Nazi movement such as an alliance with the Soviet Union, pan-European nationalism, and a spiritual, rather than biological, racism influenced by Julius Evola.

The German Social Movement (DSB) of Karl-Heinz Priester was a non-Nazi neo-fascist movement in West Germany that was founded as the German chapter of the Third Positionist European Social Movement (ESM) which also included parties like Oswald Mosley's Union Movement, the Italian Social Movement, and the New Swedish Movement of Per Engdahl. Both the ESM as a whole and its German chapter specifically advocated a pan-European fascism. Like other Third Positionist movements at the time, the DSB of Priester supported national liberation projects abroad, particularly the Algerian National Liberation Front, while also pushing for European–African cooperation via the Eurafrica concept.

Otto Strasser, upon return from exile to West Germany in 1955, founded the German Social Union (DSU), a political party that espoused Otto Strasser's version of explicitly anti-Hitler Strasserism that would form the basis of various Third Positionist movements, particularly in economic policy and in its advocacy for a European Confederation as a third force on the world stage.

With the formation of the Aktion Neue Rechte (ANR), a splinter of the National Democratic Party of Germany (NPD), in 1972, the German New Right was born, a movement that explicitly distanced itself from historical Nazism (as opposed to the so-called 'Old Right') and took major inspiration from the French Nouvelle Droite. The early German New Right that had emerged from the ANR of Henning Eichberg was closely linked with the Third Positionist movement, similarly advocating for a European nationalism and socialism in the Strasserist spirit which attracted orthodox followers of Otto Strasser such as the Independent Workers' Party (German Socialists) to the nascent movement. Yet this movement also pioneered modern New Right ideas such as ethnopluralism, a term that likely originated from a 1973 essay by Eichberg. After the dissolution of the ANR in 1974, the German New Right became dispersed and as a result grew more diverse, taking on stronger influences from the Revolutionary Conservative Movement of the Weimar Republic as well as the French Nouvelle Droite, citing Marxist thinkers like Antonio Gramsci but also neo-fascists like Julius Evola. Especially since the 2000s, the German New Right has moderated and largely claims adherence to Germany's constitution. This moderate version of the German New Right would later go on to influence parts of the Alternative for Germany.

The Third Path, a German political party founded in 2013, is named after the Third Position and likewise views itself as a third alternative to both liberal capitalism and the now-obsolete Soviet communism. Although espousing German Socialism, based on Strasserism, the party is primarily made up of more traditional neo-Nazis. It advocates for a European Confederation, a pan-European nationalist model also espoused by Strasser, and views the Ukrainian resistance against the 2022 Russian invasion as an anti-imperialist fight, supporting the Ukrainians and being a member of the pro-Ukrainian Third Positionist group Nation Europa since its foundation in 2024.

== France ==
During the 1930s and 1940s, a number of splinter groups from the radical left became associated with radical nationalism. Jacques Doriot's French Popular Party (from the French Communist Party) and Marcel Déat's National Popular Rally (from the French Section of the Workers' International). Third Position ideology gained some support in France, where in 1985 Jean-Gilles Malliarakis set up a "Third Way" political party, Troisième Voie (TV). Considering its main enemies to be the United States, communism and Zionism, the group advocated radical paths to national revolution. Associated for a time with the Groupe Union Défense, TV was generally on poor terms with Front National until 1991, when Malliarakis decided to approach them. As a result, TV fell apart and a radical splinter group under Christian Bouchet, Nouvelle Résistance, adopted National Bolshevik and then Eurasianist views.

== Italy ==
In Italy, the Third Position was developed by Roberto Fiore, along with Gabriele Adinolfi and Peppe Dimitri, in the tradition of Italian neo-fascism. Third Position's ideology is characterized by a militarist formulation, a palingenetic ultranationalism looking favourably to national liberation movements, support for racial separatism and the adherence to a soldier lifestyle. In order to construct a cultural background for the ideology, Fiore looked to the ruralism of Julius Evola and sought to combine it with the desire for a cultural-spiritual revolution. He adopted some of the positions of the contemporary far-right, notably the ethnopluralism of Alain de Benoist and the Europe-wide appeal associated with such views as the Europe a Nation campaign of Oswald Mosley (amongst others). Fiore was one of the founders of the Terza Posizione movement in 1978. Third Position ideas are now represented in Italy by Forza Nuova, led by Fiore; and by the movement CasaPound, a network of far-right social centres.

== United Kingdom ==
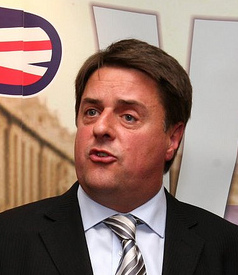
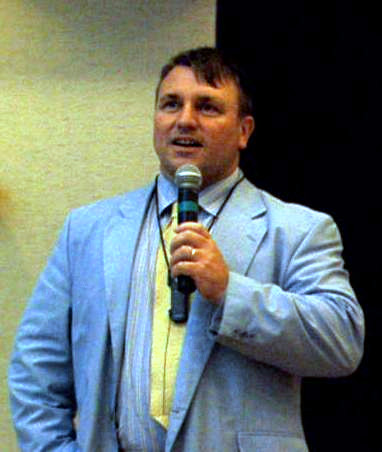
In 1983, the National Front was taken over by a Strasserist faction led by Nick Griffin (left) and Joe Pearce (right), who presented themselves as Third Positionists.

In the 1980s, the National Front, a British fascist party that had experienced the height of its success in the 1970s, was taken over by a Strasserist faction that referred to themselves as Third Positionist. The Strasserist-led National Front was also characterised by Baker as National Bolshevist in ideology. Reflecting the Nouvelle Droite's influence, the Strasserist Official NF promoted support for "a broad front of racialists of all colours" who were seeking an end to multi-racial society and capitalism, praising black nationalists like Louis Farrakhan and Marcus Garvey. Their publication, Nationalism Today, featured positive articles on the governments of Libya and Iran, presenting them as part of a global anti-capitalist and anti-Marxist third force in international politics; its members openly acknowledged the influence of Libyan leader Muammar Gaddafi and his Third International Theory. This may have had tactical as well as ideological motivations, with Libya and Iran viewed as potential sources of funding. This new rhetoric and ideology alienated much of the party's rank-and-file membership. It experienced internal problems, and in 1989 several of its senior members—Nick Griffin, Derek Holland, and Colin Todd—split from it to establish their International Third Position group. One of its leaders was Roberto Fiore, an ex-member of the Italian far-right movement Terza Posizione.

== United States ==
In the United States, Political Research Associates argues that Third Position politics has been promoted by some white nationalist and neo-Nazi groups such as the National Alliance, American Front, Traditionalist Worker Party, Patriot Front, and White Aryan Resistance, as well as some black nationalist groups, such as the Nation of Islam, since the late 20th century. In 2010, the American Third Position Party (later renamed American Freedom Party) was founded in part to channel the right-wing populist resentment engendered by the 2008 financial crisis and the policies of the Obama administration.

== See also ==
- Anti-corporate activism
- Antoun Saadeh
- Brazilian Integralism
- Corporatism
- Ecofascism
- Eurasianism
- Getulism
- Islamofascism
- MIÉP–Jobbik Third Way Alliance of Parties
- National Bolshevism
- National syndicalism
- New antisemitism
- Nouvelle Droite
- Pērkonkrusts
- Peronism
- Peruvian Ethnocacerism
- Qutbism
- Red–green–brown alliance
- Revolutionary nationalism
- Syncretic politics
- German nationalism in Austria
- Third International Theory
