= Christian Bouchet =

French far-right journalist and politician

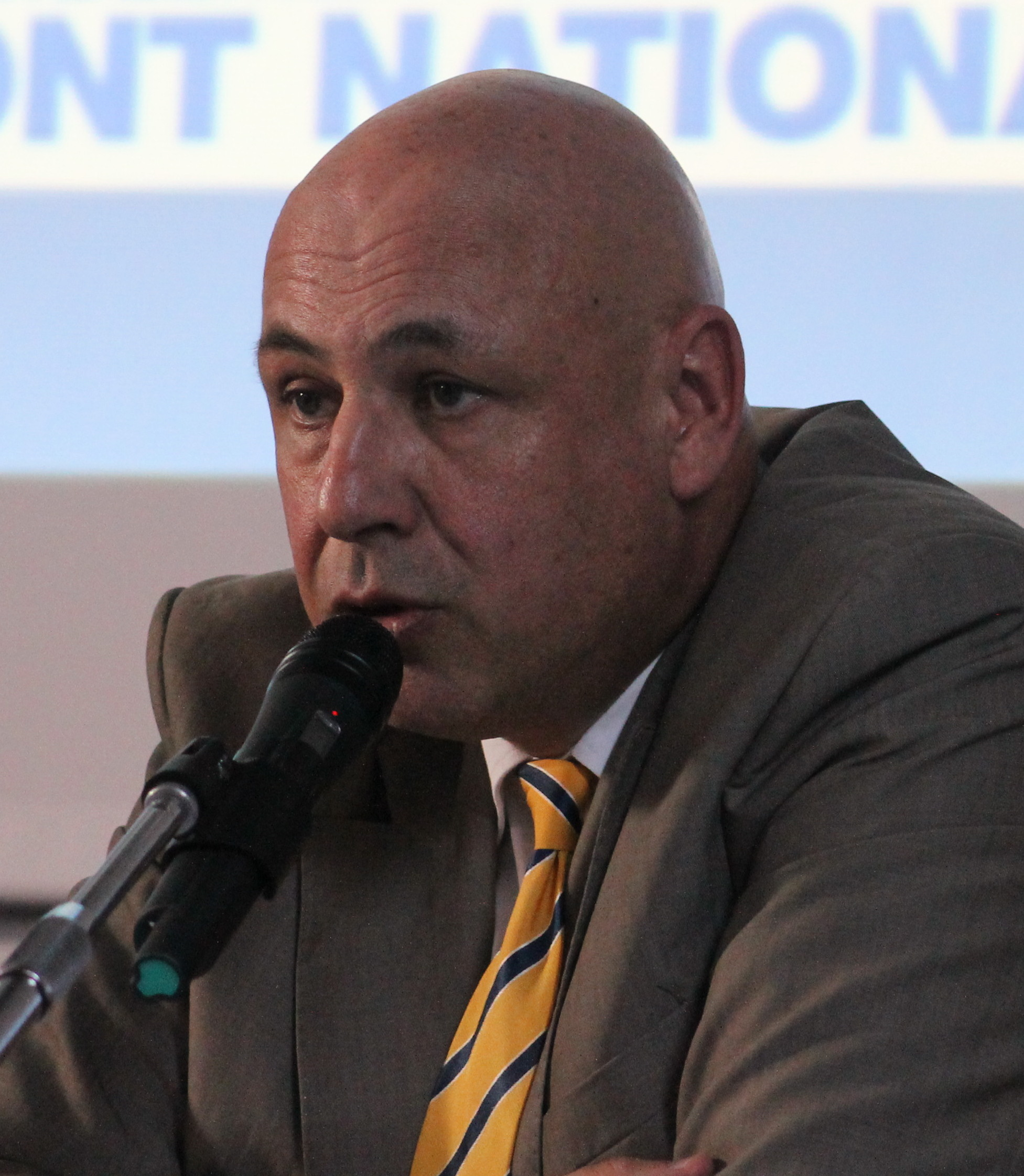
- Bouchet in 2012
- Born: 17 January 1955 (age 71); Angers, Maine-et-Loire, France
- Occupations: Journalist, politician

Christian Bouchet (French: [kʁistjɑ̃ buʃɛ]; born 17 January 1955) is a French far-right journalist and politician.

== Biography ==
Coming from a far-right family with monarchist and Organisation armée secrète links, in 1970 Bouchet joined the monarchist group Restauration nationale, and, in 1971, a member of Nouvelle Action française which was a split (called in France a "Mao-maurrassien" group) of the former.

In 1973, he served in the Organisation lutte du peuple, a nationalist revolutionary splitter group of the far-right movement Ordre Nouveau intended to defend the nationalist movements of the Third World, particularly the Arab states opposed to Zionism and what they perceived as American imperialism. He subsequently became a member of François Duprat's Groupes nationalistes révolutionnaires and of the Revolutionary Nationalist Movement (Mouvement nationaliste révolutionnaire) of Jean-Gilles Malliarakis. After a spell in the Troisième Voie he set up Nouvelle Résistance in 1991, whilst also refounding the European Liberation Front. This group was absorbed by Unité Radicale in 1998. He then went on to lead the study group Réseau Radical which emphasised anti-Zionism and after that the association Les Nôtres. He also led the 'radical' tendency within the National Republican Movement and has sat on its national council. Bouchet, who was an exponent of the Third Position until 1990, was later influenced by Aleksandr Dugin and advocated National Bolshevism and then Eurasianism.

After declaring that he had broken with his former activism, he joined the Front National in 2008 and became a local branch leader from October 2010 to May 2011 and from March 2013 onwards. He has been a Front National candidate in every election since 2008 and in 2013, the Front National chose him to lead its list for the municipal elections in Nantes (the 6th town of France). He is the father of Gauthier Bouchet, the FN municipal councillor of Saint-Nazaire.

He published journals like Lutte de Peuple and Résistance which focused on ultra-nationalist and anti-Zionist themes. He owned the publishing house Ars magna and Avatar which published volumes of Savitri Devi, Jean-François Thiriart, Francis Parker Yockey, Gabriele d'Annunzio, Aleksandr Dugin and others.

In the original edition of his book Hitler's Priestess, Nicholas Goodrick-Clarke wrote that Bouchet has been associated with Nazi mysticism and that, whilst spending a year in India, he met Savitri Devi to study Kali Yuga and her ideas about Adolf Hitler as an Avatar. These claims did not however appear in the French language edition of the same work. In the postscript to the book Le national-socialisme et la tradition indienne, Bouchet claimed that Goodrick-Clarkes's allegations were false, that he had met Savitri Devi only once and considered her to be a crank, and that he has no personal interest in Nazi mysticism. Bouchet, who claims he is not an Islamophobe, has advocated a closer link between European nationalist groups and Muslim traditionalists.

Christian Bouchet wrote a doctoral thesis in anthropology in the University Paris Diderot on Aleister Crowley and has written many books about extremist involvement in politics and religion.
