= Identity Catholicism =

"Identity Catholicism" or Identitarian Catholicism appeared in the 1980s to describe a movement of Catholicism, supposedly in opposition to an "open Catholicism". It was particularly after "La Manif pour tous" that this expression became common.

== Introduction ==
For Erwan Le Morhedec, some Catholics would be tempted to attach themselves more to the ritual and cultural markers of Catholicism rather than to their own faith. "Within the temptation of identity, it is politics which takes precedence over faith, it is the submission of faith to politics." For the author, identitarianism would be an ideology, an individual imprisonment, even a spiritual mystification.

== Origin of the expression ==
According to Guillaume Cuchet, this terminology comes from a 2002 article by Philippe Portier.

== "Identité" and "ouverture" ==
Since Philippe Portier established the notion, the terms catholicisme d'identité ('identity Catholicism') and catholicisme d'ouverture ('openness Catholicism') have been used to designate "the two main trends of the contemporary Catholic movement in the Catholic Church in France".

The catholiques d'ouverture are those who want "to take into account, in today's world, the forces of progress, mercy" and they believe that "it is from the encounter, the dialog of minds that we can build the world, without a predetermined notion blocking the path". They wish to "reconcile the political Left and Christianity". They experienced their heyday around the late sixties. This segment of French Catholicism is described as being in decline, with a low degree of intergenerational transmittal of the Christian faith, and inspiring few individuals to seek priestly or religious vocations.

Identity Catholics are described as dreaming of "visibility in alobalized and communitarian world" and with "a rather pessimist view of the world as it is". They seek to restore "the Church to its traditional status of guide for the community, as defensor civitatis. They "favor the idea that the social must be grounded on objective norms", according to Philippe Portier. According to Magali Della Sudda, identity Catholicism is subdivided into two sub-categories, charismatics and restitutionists. The latter are associated with Opus Dei, the Community of Saint Martin, the Community of St. John, the Legionaries of Christ, the Foyers de Charité, and other groups that emerged from the Lefebvrist schism".

== Criticism ==
Guillaume Cuchet believes that the distinction between "identity" and "openness", attributed to Philippe Portier, does not work well, because the terms do not really correspond: "in the tandem, "identity" and "openness" do not exactly refer to the same thing. On the one hand, it is about self-definition; on the other, the attitude towards the modern world. Now, let us know, Catholics of "openness" also have an "identity", even if they do not like the word very much, except without doubt saying that their "identity" is precisely their "openness".
