= Les Identitaires =

French identitarian political movement

The Identitarians Les Identitaires
- President: Fabrice Robert
- Founded: 6 April 2003; 23 years ago
- Preceded by: Radical Unity
- Headquarters: BP 13; 06301 Nice Cedex 04
- Newspaper: Novopress
- Youth wing: Generation Identity/Generation Identitaire (formerly)
- Ideology: French nationalism Ethnopluralism; Identitarianism; Anti-Americanism; Anti-Islam; Neo-fascism; Factions: Neo-Nazism
- Political position: Far-right
- Colours: Black, Blue

Party flag

Website
- les-identitaires.fr

Les Identitaires (English: The Identitarians), formerly the Bloc identitaire (English: Identitarian Bloc), is an Identitarian nationalist movement in France. Like the French New Right, some consider the movement far-right while others consider it a syncretic mixture of multiple ideologies across the political spectrum.

Les Identitaires contain a number of strains of political thought including nativism, Catholic social teaching, direct democracy, regionalist decentralisation, and Yann Fouere's concept of a Europe of 100 Flags. The group additionally advocates an anti-American and anti-Islamic foreign policy, calling the United States and Islam the two major imperialistic threats to Europe.

It was founded in 2003 by some former members of Unité Radicale and several other anti-Zionist and National Bolshevik sympathisers. It includes Fabrice Robert, former Unité Radicale member, former elected representative of the National Front (FN) and also former member of the National Republican Movement (MNR), and Guillaume Luyt, former member of the monarchist Action française, former Unité Radicale member, former director of the youth organisation of the FN, National Front Youth (FNJ). Luyt claims inspiration by Guillaume Faye's works in the Nouvelle Droite movement.

The movement is widely considered neo-fascist, although Les Identitaires does not consider itself as such. Génération Identitaire was banned in March 2021. On 14 February 2023, the Global Project Against Hate and Extremism (GPAHE) released a report in which it classified Les Identitaires as a white nationalist and anti-Muslim group.

== Ideology ==
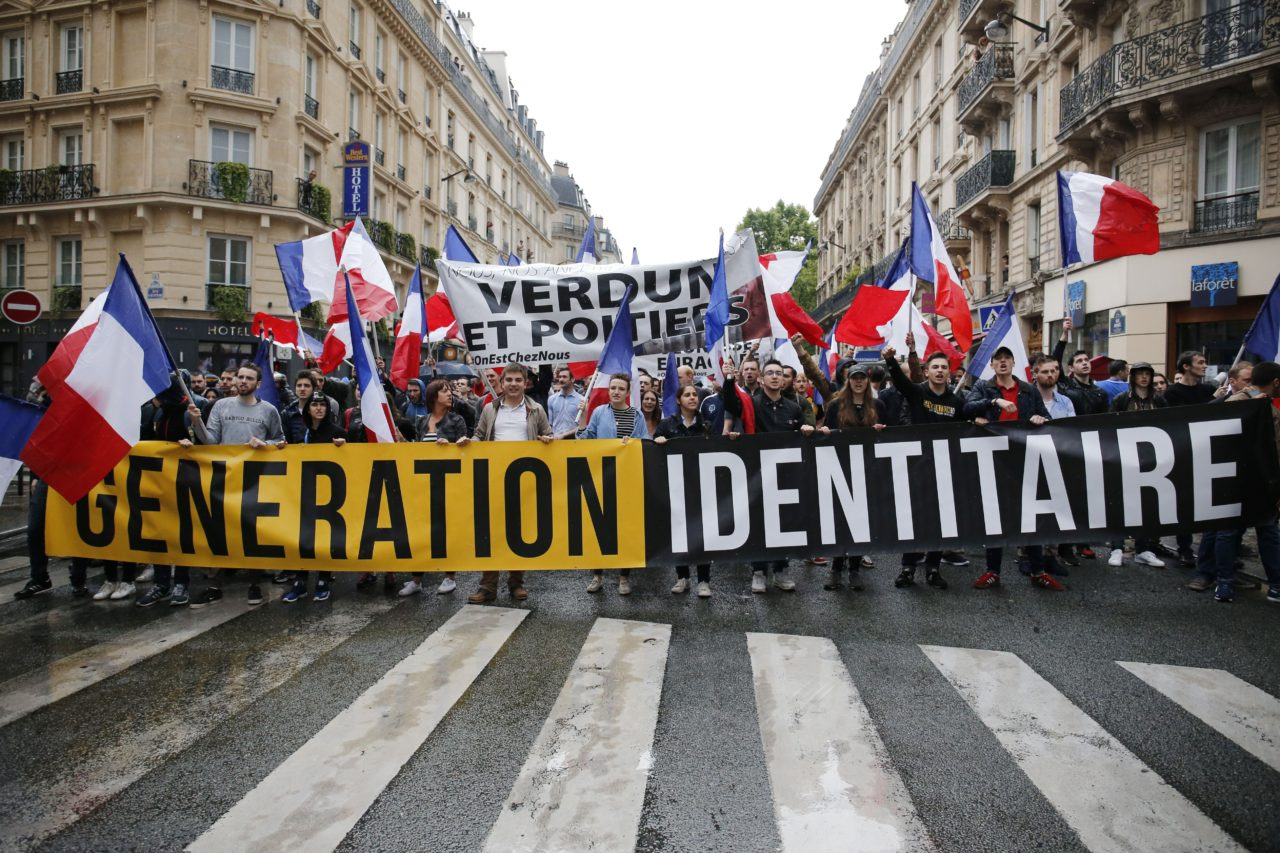
A Génération Identitaire demonstration in France, 2017

It opposes "imperialism, whether it be American or Islamic," and supports the far-right Great Replacement conspiracy theory.

The Bloc Identitaire runs the agency and website Novopress, that has associates in most of Western Europe and North America.

== Novopress ==
Novopress presents itself as an "international news agency" founded by Fabrice Robert, a leader of the French nationalist organization Bloc Identitaire. Among its managers is Guillaume Luyt, former leader of the Front national de la jeunesse. Patrick Gofman is one of the editors of Novopress.info (French section).

Novopress is politically geared towards conservative, anti-Islamist and sometimes even far right themes. As of 2008 Novopress had 13 national editions in Europe and North America, including in Ireland, Italy and France.

Logo of Novopress

== Youth wing ==
The youth wing of Bloc Identitaire, called in France Génération identitaire, or Identity Generation, expanded to other European states soon after its creation in 2012, including Generazione Identitaria in Italy and Identitäre Bewegung in Germany and Austria. Other youth wings are also present in the Czech Republic, the Netherlands, Belgium, Slovenia, Hungary, and the United Kingdom and Ireland. France banned Generation Identity in March 2021.

== Controversies ==
The Bloc Identitaire has been accused of intentionally distributing several popular soups containing pork in order to exclude religious Jews or Muslims; in Strasbourg, Nice, Paris, and in Antwerp with the association Antwerpse Solidariteit close to the Vlaams Belang. These so-called "identity soups" ("soupes identitaires") have been forbidden by the prefecture of the Haut-Rhin in Strasbourg on 21 January 2006, and called "discriminatory and xenophobic" by MEP Catherine Trautmann (PS) in a 19 January 2006 letter to the High authority for the struggle against discrimination and for equality (HALDE).

This ethno-regionalist movement has also organised a campaign against the rap group Sniper in 2003, which was taken up by the conservative Union for a Popular Movement (UMP), leading to the cancellation of several concerts of the band. UMP deputy Nadine Morano interpolated Interior Minister (UMP) Nicolas Sarkozy on this theme, while 200 UMP deputies, led by François Grosdidier, tried without success to censor several hip-hop bands. Sarkozy criticized the hip-hop group as "ruffians who dishonour France."

In 2004, the Bloc Identitaire also organized a campaign against Italian writer Cesare Battisti, one-time member of the terrorist group Armed Proletarians for Communism, who was wanted in Italy for an assassination carried out during the Years of Lead, in which he denies responsibility. Battisti accused the "cell of the Italian embassy" of having "financed" the Bloc identitaire's campaign against him (in Ma Cavale, p. 160). Battisti was convicted to life sentence in his homeland for a total of 36 charges, including participation in four murders. The French government would subsequently decide to extradite him to Italy, but Battisti escaped to Brazil where he was granted political asylum.

In 2010, they staged a protest in "resistance to the Islamization of France" at the Arc de Triomphe (relocated from an earlier planned site in Goutte-d'Or) where people would eat pork and drink grape juice or wine. In November 2012 the Génération Identitaire, the youth wing of the BI, occupied the mosque in Poitiers, the site where Charles Martel defeated an invading Muslim Moorish force in 732. In June 2018, Facebook banned Generation Identity for violating its policies against extremist content and hate groups.

In December 2018, Al Jazeera produced a documentary entitled Generation Hate featuring an undercover journalist who had infiltrated Génération Identitaire. The documentary included undercover footage of Génération Identitaire members in the northern French city of Lille racially abusing and assaulting migrant youths, advocating violence against Muslims, and alleged linkages between Génération Identitaire and Front National. Génération Identitaire's actions were condemned by Mayor of Lille Martine Aubry and Prefect of the North Michele Lalande, who advocated prosecuting offenders for inciting hatred and closing down La Citadelle, which served as a meeting place for location Génération Identitaire members in Lille. Prosecutor Thierry Pocquet Haut-Jussé has also announced an investigation by the Central Directorate of Public Security into the activities of the Génération Identitaire members.

On 11 July 2019, Germany's Federal Office for the Protection of the Constitution (BfV), the country's domestic intelligence agency, formally designated the Identitarian Movement as "a verified extreme right movement against the liberal democratic constitution." The new classification will allow the BfV to use more powerful surveillance methods against the group and its youth wing, Generation Identity. The Identitarian Movement has about 600 members in Germany.

== Lawsuit ==
In August 2019, a French court sentenced three members of Generation Identity to a six-month jail term, fines of €2,000 each and loss of civic rights for five years, and fined the pan-European organisation €75,000, over an anti-immigrant operation in the Alps. Generation Identity president Clément Gandelin, spokesman Romain Espino and Damien Lefèvre were found guilty of "exercising activities in conditions that could create confusion with a public function". The case was that the operation, involving about 100 of their members at the Col de l'Échelle in April 2018, could have been mistaken for a police action.

== Ban ==
On 3 March 2021, France banned Génération Identitaire (Generation Identity), as the Interior Minister Gérald Darmanin said the movement incited "discrimination, hatred and violence". A few weeks before, dozens of people protested in Paris against the dissolution. About 200 protesters were estimated to be present.

Jordan Bardella, at the time the spokesperson for the National Rally, posted statements of support for Génération Identitaire. As a result, Facebook removed the posts and suspended certain features of his account.
