= Third Way (France) =

French neo-fascist political group

Third Way (French: Troisième voie) is a French Third Position organization founded in 1985 by a merger of the small neo-fascist group Mouvement Nationaliste Révolutionnaire (English: National Revolutionary Movement), which gathered former members of François Duprat's Revolutionary Nationalist Groups, with dissidents from the Party of New Forces.

Led by Jean-Gilles Malliarakis, the party adopted the slogan of "neither trusts nor soviets" ("ni trusts, ni soviets") and stood against communism, capitalism, and Zionism. It used a trident as its emblem. For a time the party was associated with the Groupe Union Défense but maintained a generally poor relationship with the Front National (FN). This was the case until 1991 when Malliarakis decided to approach the FN, leading to a schism within the party from those who felt the FN did not conform to their way of thinking. As a result, Christian Bouchet and his followers split off to form Nouvelle Résistance, a group that was to be more National Bolshevik in tone. The Third Way itself remained in the hands of Malliarakis but was dissolved soon after the split.

Troisième voie also maintained links with the white power music scene as Gaël Bodilis, who set up the Rebelles Européens record label in Brest, was for a time a member of the group.
