= Rock identitaire français =

Rock identitaire français (RIF) is a nationalistic music genre associated with the French far right.

Anti-immigration, anti-globalism, and anti-Americanism are common lyrical themes.

== Sources ==
Rock Haine Roll. Origines, histoires et acteurs du Rock Identitaire Français, une tentative de contre-culture d'extrême droite, Collectif, Éditions No Pasaran, May 2004, 186 pages.

== See also ==
- Groupe Union Défense
- Italian alternative music
- Rock Against Communism
