= Maxime Brunerie =

French criminal and neo-Nazi (born 1977)

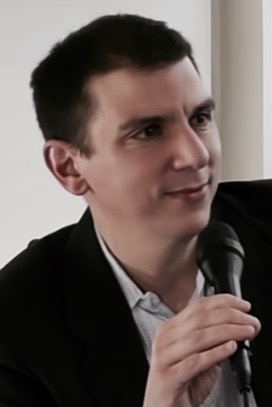
- Born: 21 May 1977 (age 49); Courcouronnes, France
- Occupation: Neo-Nazi activist (formerly)
- Known for: Attempting to assassinate President Jacques Chirac
- Status: Released
- Conviction: Attempted murder
- Penalty: 10 years

Details
- Date: 14 July 2002; Just before 10 a.m.
- Locations: Champs-Élysées, Paris
- Weapon: .22 rifle
- Imprisoned at: Val-de-Reuil

Maxime Brunerie (born 21 May 1977) is a French convicted criminal and former neo-Nazi activist, known for his 14 July 2002 assassination attempt on Jacques Chirac, while he was still the President of France, during the Bastille Day celebrations in Paris.

== Biography ==
=== Early life ===
Maxime Brunerie was born 21 May 1977 in Courcouronnes, a southern outer suburb of Paris, the son of Annie and Jean Brunerie. He was a far-right activist, participated in protests and worked as a janitor.

Diagnosed with lymphoma in 1998 and undergoing chemotherapy, Brunerie found a propaganda sticker of the neo-Nazi French and European Nationalist Party (PNFE); he became a member of the group between June and November 1998, when he left the "agonising party" to join the Groupe Union Défense, renamed Unité Radicale early that year. In June 1999, Brunerie entered the National Republican Movement led by Bruno Mégret. He ran for the party in the 2001 municipal election in the 18th arrondissement of Paris. Brunerie attended BTS studies in management accounting after 2000.

=== Assassination attempt ===
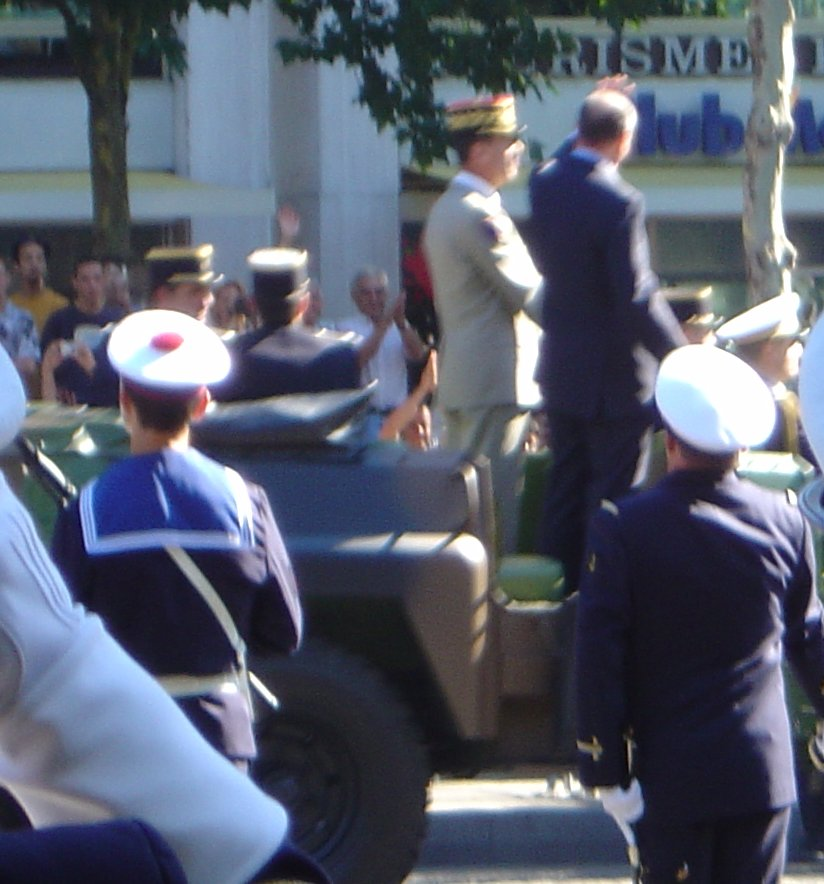
While Jacques Chirac was reviewing troops in a motorcade such as this one on Bastille Day 2002, he was shot at by Brunerie.

On 14 July 2002, 25-year-old Brunerie attempted to assassinate President Jacques Chirac by firearm during the Bastille Day military parade on the Champs-Élysées in Paris.

The week before the attempt, Brunerie obtained a .22 rifle. On the day before the attempt, Brunerie left a message on the Combat 18 guestbook saying "Watch the Tv This Sunday, i will be the star... Death to zog,88!" [sic]

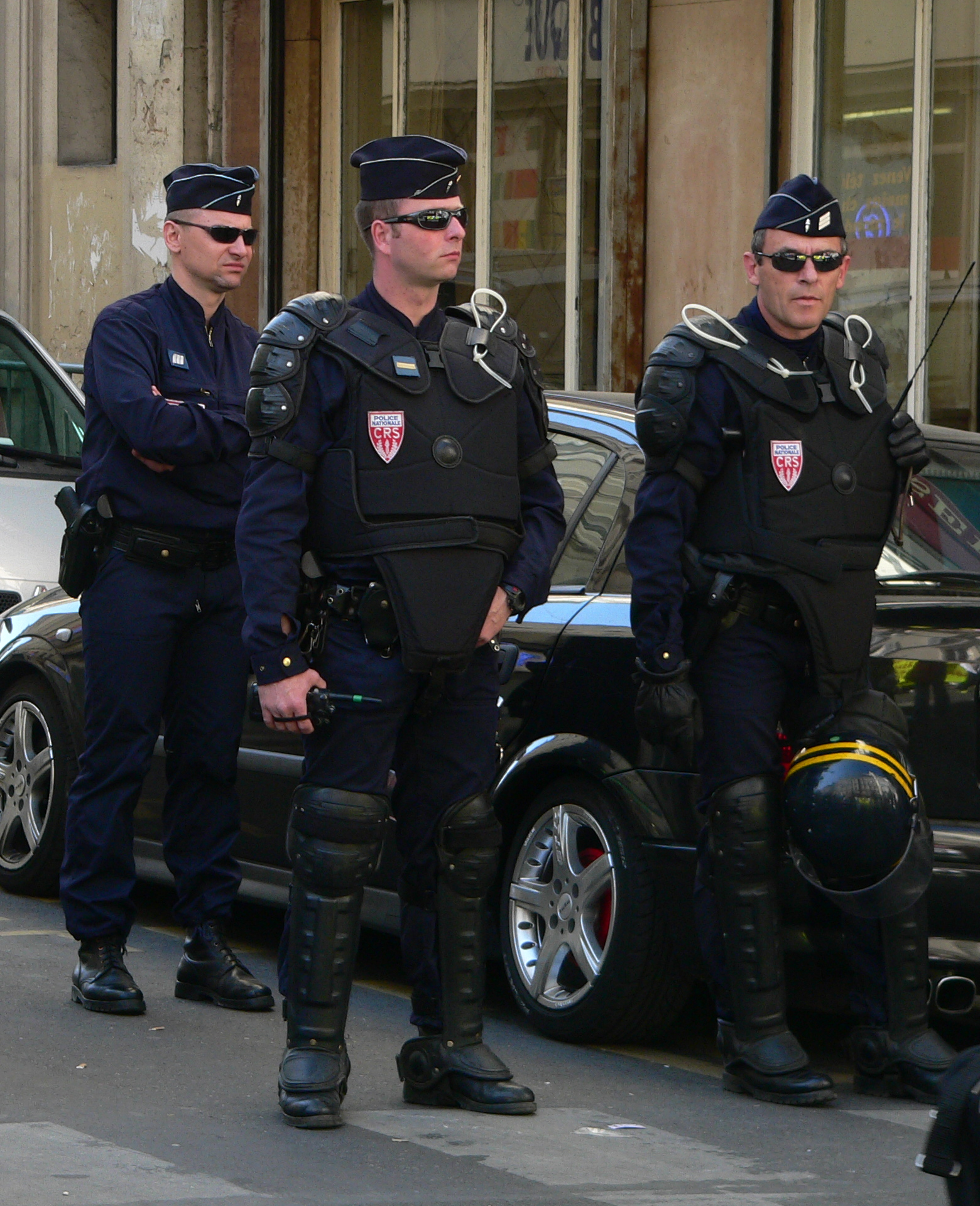
CRS in riot control gear

Armed with a .22 rifle hidden in his father's guitar case, Brunerie attempted to fire one shot from the sidewalk at the passing presidential motorcade; spectators noticed him before he attempted suicide. Spectators were able to divert his gun before the police were able to arrest him. According to police, the shot was very wide and the shooter's inexperience and lack of preparation made a successful assassination attempt unlikely.

Brunerie was found to have been linked to the far-right group Unité Radicale (which was dissolved in the aftermath of the shooting); he had been a candidate for the far-right party Mouvement National Républicain at a local election, as well as being associated with the French and European Nationalist Party.

After the police searched his house, they found a copy of Mein Kampf and a skinhead-themed music CD.

Brunerie's trial began on 6 December 2004. The court eventually found the defendant guilty of attempted murder, judging that his mental responsibility, though diminished, was not abolished. On 10 December 2004, Brunerie was sentenced to ten years of prison. He was freed after seven years in jail, on 3 August 2009.

=== After his release ===
Brunerie stated that he did not want to kill Chirac, but rather wanted to commit suicide by cop by being beaten to death by the GIGN.

He finished his BTS in management accounting in prison.

He was interviewed by Europe 1 not long after his release, stating that he "lost it" in 2002 and wants to move on.

In 2011, he released an autobiography titled A normal life: I wanted to kill Jacques Chirac and now says he is far from any political activism. The same year he founded a book reselling company. His political views changed; he requested a membership for the Democratic Movement but was denied. He voted for Ségolène Royal in the 2011 Socialist Party presidential primary.

In 2011, he was set to publish a short story in a literary magazine called Bordel; the story was removed before publication.

In 2012, he triggered a controversy by participating in the jury of a literary prize created by Laurence Biava.

In 2013, he participated in a protest against same-sex marriage. In 2018, he was sentenced to a suspended prison sentence of three months for domestic abuse.
