= Unité Radicale =

Defunct far-right French political party

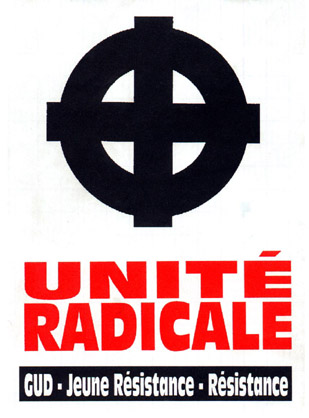
Unité Radicale sticker.

Unité Radicale was a French far-right political group close to the Third Position and National Bolshevism thesis. It was founded in June 1998 from the merger of Groupe Union Défense and Nouvelle Résistance/Jeune Résistance/Union des Cercles Résistance, issued from Nouvelle Résistance, and dissolved on August 6, 2002. The group was led by Christian Bouchet.

Unité Radicale promoted a racist, antisemitic and anti-American political agenda adopting Nazi imagery during activities.

The group worked with the Mouvement national républicain of Bruno Mégret and some members of Unité Radicale were members of the Conseil national of this party.

Contributors to their website included former Collaborationist Roland Gaucher, who participated to the 1972 foundation of the National Front, along with Le Pen.

At the beginning of 2002, Unité Radicale split. Christian Bouchet departed the movement with his friends, and the group was then led by Fabrice Robert and Guillaume Luyt who gave it a more racist and anti-Muslim outlook.

An Unité Radicale member, Maxime Brunerie, tried to assassinate president Jacques Chirac on Bastille Day in 2002. Although Unité Radicale contended that Maxime Brunerie was not even a bona fide member, the French government administratively disbanded the group.

Subsequently, some former members of Unité Radicale formed another group, Bloc Identitaire, while some other "nationalist revolutionaries" of Unité Radicale formed the study group Réseau Radical (2002–2006), close to Bouchet's newspaper Résistances.
