= Nouvelle Résistance =

New Resistance Nouvelle Résistance
- Founder: Christian Bouchet
- Founded: 1991
- Dissolved: 1997
- Split from: Troisième Voie
- Headquarters: France
- Ideology: National Bolshevism; Third Position; Ecofascism; Anti-Zionism; Anti-clericalism
- Political position: Far-right

Nouvelle Résistance (NR) was a French far-right group created in August 1991 by Christian Bouchet as an offshoot of Troisième Voie (Third Way), which was headed by Bouchet. Dissolved in 1997, NR described themselves as "national revolutionary" and part of the National Bolshevism international movement. It succeeded to the Troisième voie and Jeune Europe, a movement created in the 1960s by Jean-François Thiriart.

NR was both anti-Communist and anti-capitalist as well as ecofascist. In 1989, then general secretary of the Troisième Voie, Christian Bouchet stated that there were two possible alternatives: either present themselves as a "National Revolutionary wing/margin of the National Front" or present itself as a "contest movement" which supported "all forms of contest (regional, ecologic, social, popular," etc. The NR first decided to oppose the National Front "reactionary right" and enacted a policy of "the peripheries against the center," advocating for the creation of an "anti-establishment front," and rejecting left/right division. Bouchet then stated that this strategy had failed, and advocated alliance with Jean-Marie Le Pen's National Front, on a "Less Leftism! More Fascism!" slogan.

It also supported state secularism and anti-clericalism, and opposed United States cultural imperialism. Practicing a politic of entryism explicitly inspired by the Trotskyists, the NR also infiltrated the national direction of the deep ecology movement Earth First. NR was also anti-Zionist. They transformed themselves in the Union des cercles résistance in Autumn 1996 during its third congress held in Aix-en-Provence; the Unité radicale movement was created from this.

== See also ==
- History of far-right movements in France
- National Bolshevism
- Neo-Nazism
- Third Position
