= Stéphane François =

French political scientist

Stéphane François (born 1 January 1973) is a French political scientist who specializes in radical right-wing movements. He also studies conspiracy theories, political ecology and countercultures.

== Life and career ==
Born on 1 January 1973, Stéphane François attended Lille 2 University of Health and Law, where he obtained a PhD in political science after a doctoral thesis on the "Paganism of the Nouvelle Droite."

François is a professor of political science at the University of Mons. An associate member of the CNRS, he has been a member of the Observatoire des radicalités politiques ("Observatory of political radicalism") since 2014, and a researcher in the Groupe Sociétés, Religions, Laïcités ("Societies, Religions, Secularism Group"). François is also a lecturer in contemporary history and political science at the University of Valenciennes.

== Works ==
- La Musique europaïenne. Ethnographie politique d’une subculture de droite, preface by Jean-Yves Camus, Paris, L’Harmattan, 2006. ISBN 2-296-01591-3
- Le Néo-paganisme : une vision du monde en plein essor (preface by Jean-François Mayer), Apremont, 2007 ISBN 2914946465.
- Les Néo-paganismes et la Nouvelle Droite : pour une autre approche (preface by Philippe Raynaud), Archè, 2008 ISBN 978-88-7252-287-5
- Le complot cosmique. Théorie du complot, ovnis, théosophie et extrémistes politiques (with Emmanuel Kreis), Archè, 2010 ISBN 978-88-7252-299-8.
- L'Ésotérisme, la « tradition » et l'initiation. Essai de définition, Grammata, 2011 ISBN 9782918863045
- La Nouvelle Droite et la tradition, Archè, 2012 ISBN 978-88-7252-311-7
- À droite de l'acacia : de la nature réelle de la Franc-maçonnerie ?, La Hutte, 2012 ISBN 9782916123578
- L'écologie politique : Une vision du monde réactionnaire ? Réflexions sur le positionnement idéologique de quelques valeur, Cerf, 2012 ISBN 9782204097208
- La Modernité en procès : éléments d'un refus du monde moderne, Presses universitaires de Valenciennes, 2013 ISBN 978-2-36424-016-2.
- Au-delà des vents du Nord : l'extrême-droite française, le pôle Nord et les Indo-Européens (preface by Laurent Olivier), Presses universitaires de Lyon, 2014 ISBN 978-2-7297-0874-0.
- Histoire de la haine identitaire : mutations et diffusions de l'altérophobie (with Nicolas Lebourg), Presses universitaires de Valenciennes 2016 ISBN 978-2-36424-031-5.
- Le Retour de Pan : panthéisme, néo-paganisme et antichristianisme dans l'écologie radicale, Archè, 2016 ISBN 978-8-8725-2342-1.
- Le Service public et les idéologies politiques (with Emmanuel Cherrier), Villeneuve-d'Ascq, Presses universitaires du Septentrion, 2016 ISBN 978-2-7574-1380-7.
- L'occultisme nazi : entre la SS et l'ésotérisme. CNRS Éditions. 2020. ISBN 978-2-271-13135-5. OCLC 1144712020.
- Le rejet de l'Occident : l'ésotérisme, le complotisme et le refus de la société libérale, Paris, Dervy, 2020 ISBN 979-10-242-0570-0.
- La Nouvelle Droite et ses dissidences : identité, écologie et paganisme, Lormont, Le Bord de l'Eau, 2021 ISBN 978-2-35687-760-4.
- Les Vert-bruns. L'écologie de l'extrême droite française, Le Bord de l'Eau, 2022 ISBN 978-2-3568-7835-9.
- Géopolitique des extrêmes droites. Logiques identitaires et monde multipolaire, Le cavalier bleu, 2022 ISBN 9791031805030.
- Une avant-garde d'extrême droite. Contre-culture, conservatisme radical et tentation moderniste, éditions de la Lanterne, 2022 ISBN 978-2-9566386-7-4.
- La Nouvelle Droite et le nazisme, une histoire sans fin. Révolution conservatrice allemande, national-socialisme et alt-right, Le Bord de l'eau, 2024 ISBN 978-2-38519-016-3.
