= Jean-Yves Camus =

French political scientist (born 1958)

- Born: 1958 (age 67–68); Châtenay-Malabry, France
- Education: Sciences Po
- Occupation: Political scientist

Jean-Yves Camus (born 1958) is a French political scientist who specializes in nationalist movements in Europe.

== Life and career ==
Born in 1958 to a Catholic and Gaullist family, Camus is an observant Jew and describes himself as part of "the anti-totalitarian left". He earned a M.A.S. in contemporary history at Sciences Po in 1982.

He has been a researcher at the Institut de relations internationales et stratégiques since 2006 and the president of the Observatoire des radicalités politiques ("Observatory of political radicalism") at the center-left think tank Fondation Jean-Jaurès since 2014.

In February 2016, Camus was nominated member of the scientific council of the Délégation interministérielle à la lutte contre le racisme et l'antisémitisme (DILCRA), directed by Dominique Schnapper.

== Works ==
- Les Droites nationales et radicales en France, (with René Monzat), Lyon, Presses universitaires de Lyon, 1992 (ISBN 2-7297-0416-7).
- Dir., Les Extrémistes, de l'Atlantique à l'Oural, Éditions de l'Aube, 1996 et 1998.
- Le Front national, histoire et analyse, Paris, Éditions Olivier Laurens, 1996 (ISBN 2-911838-01-7).
- L’Extrême droite aujourd'hui, Toulouse, Éditions Milan, « Les essentiels », 1997 (ISBN 2-84113-496-2).
- Le Front national, Toulouse, Éditions Milan, « Les essentiels », 1998 (ISBN 2-84113-608-6).
- Dir., Les Extrémismes en Europe, La Tour d'Aigues, éditions de l'Aube, 1998 (ISBN 978-2876784413).
- Le Monde juif, (with Annie-Paule Derczansky), Toulouse, Éditions Milan, « Les essentiels », 2001 (ISBN 2-7459-0226-1).
- Extrémismes en France : faut-il en avoir peur ?, Toulouse, Éditions Milan, « Milan actu », 2006 (ISBN 2-7459-2357-9).
- Les Droites extrêmes en Europe (with Nicolas Lebourg), Paris, Le Seuil, 2015 (English translation : Far-Right Politics in Europe, Cambridge, Harvard University Press, 2017).
