= Republican Front (French Fifth Republic) =

French political coalition

In France, under the Fifth Republic, the term Republican Front (French: front républicain) refers to the coalition formed during an election by multiple political parties to oppose the National Front (FN), which became the National Rally (RN) in 2018. The RN is viewed by these parties as a far-right organization opposed to the Republican Regime.

This concept has its origins in various coalitions or strategies aimed at defending the republican regime and countering the far-right since the Third Republic, notably the similarly named Republican Front of 1956. According to L'Express, this idea dates back to the end of the Fourth Republic and, from Chirac to Macron, has often represented more of a concept than a consistent political practice, except at certain pivotal moments.

Since the Republican Front's electoral rise in the 1980s, it has been inconsistently applied, often leaning more to the left than the right. The governing right has sometimes formed local alliances with the far right, justifying its strategy by citing the alliances between socialists and communists. The 2002 presidential election runoff is seen as the apex of the Republican Front strategy.

Its effectiveness and legitimacy have been regularly challenged, particularly following the FN's electoral resurgence in the early 2010s. Many political actors and observers declared it "dead" after the UMP adopted the so-called "neither-nor" doctrine (neither PS nor FN) in 2011.

The Republican Front fully fulfilled its role in the 2017 and 2022 presidential elections, securing the election of the central bloc's representative against the National Rally. However, this strategy has weakened over time.

A resurgence of the Republican Front was observed during the second round of the 2024 legislative elections, although the Republicans and some figures from the presidential majority abstained from participating. Nonetheless, these movements benefited in terms of elected representatives.

Following the death of far-right activist Quentin Deranque, in February 2026, calls for an anti-LFI barrier have multiplied: Jordan Bardella (RN) called to keep LFI "out of institutions". François-Xavier Bellamy (LR) spoke of a “republican barrier,” and Aurore Bergé (Renaissance) even invites the RN to join a front against LFI.

This shift was also visible within parts of the left, where the PS is seeking to distance itself from LFI, while the centrist bloc promotes a “neither RN nor LFI” stance.

== Definition ==
The Republican Front claims to defend the republican system (on the left) against the National Rally (on the right)

The term refers to the coalition of right- and left-wing political parties during elections, typically in the second round or executive elections, to block a National Rally (FN) victory. In this context, the FN is viewed as an opponent of the republican regime. Other similar terms include the "Republican Arc" or the "Republican Pact," which have different connotations.

According to researcher Joël Gombin, the notion of a Republican Front "lacks true analytical or scientific value" and is ambiguous because "it draws on the imagery of 'Republican values,' implying a moral reference point, whereas the positions taken are to the political interests of those involved." These interests are twofold: electoral gain and internal dynamics within political formations.

Linguist Philippe Blanchet argues that the Republican Front represents "a frequent misuse of the concept of the republic in French media and political discourse." He suggests that terms like "Human Rights Front" or "Humanist Front" would be more appropriate given the FN's program, which he describes as infringing on human rights.

The FN's adherence to the republican regime is a subject of debate among academics, with some questioning the very consistency of the concept of a republican regime.

The related strategy known as the "sanitary cordon" or the "republican dam" involves excluding far-right parties from majorities in local, regional, and national governments and refraining from encouraging voters to transfer their votes to the FN, according to the definition provided by Jean-Yves Camus. Eugénie Bastié notes that the term "sanitary cordon" originates from the Netherlands, where it described the policy established in the late 1980s to exclude far-right parties from any electoral coalition. Academic Pierre Ecuvillon explains that the term comes from medical vocabulary, specifically to measures taken during epidemics to limit or prevent access to a contaminated area. He concludes that this term symbolizes an ideal political configuration in which the FN is not only kept at a distance but is also perceived as belonging to an entirely different sphere of reality.

== History ==
Historian Nicolas Lebourg and political scientists Pascal Perrineau, Philippe Braud, Joël Gombin, and Marc Crapez argue that the strategy of the front républicain does not constitute a tradition, despite often being portrayed as such. Nicolas Lebourg states that "there are various tactics and different periods in dealing with the FN." Pascal Perrineau describes it as "a fluctuating concept that works rather poorly. It is applied more or less depending on the stakes, political circumstances, and local situations." Philippe Braud asserts that the front républicain is a concept with "a falsely long history" and has never been "deeply rooted." Joël Gombin argues that the front républicain has "always been inconsistent" and "reflects a mythology rather than a rational and factual debate." Pierre Ecuvillon notes that "while the sanitary cordon became very visible following the Carpentras tragedy, its political counterpart, the front républicain, has struggled much more to take shape. When it is mentioned, it is most often to observe and lament its absence."

=== Origins ===
Many observers trace its origins back to the Republican Front of 1956, a center-left electoral coalition formed in France for the January 1956 legislative elections to counter the Poujadist movement and resolve the Algerian War.

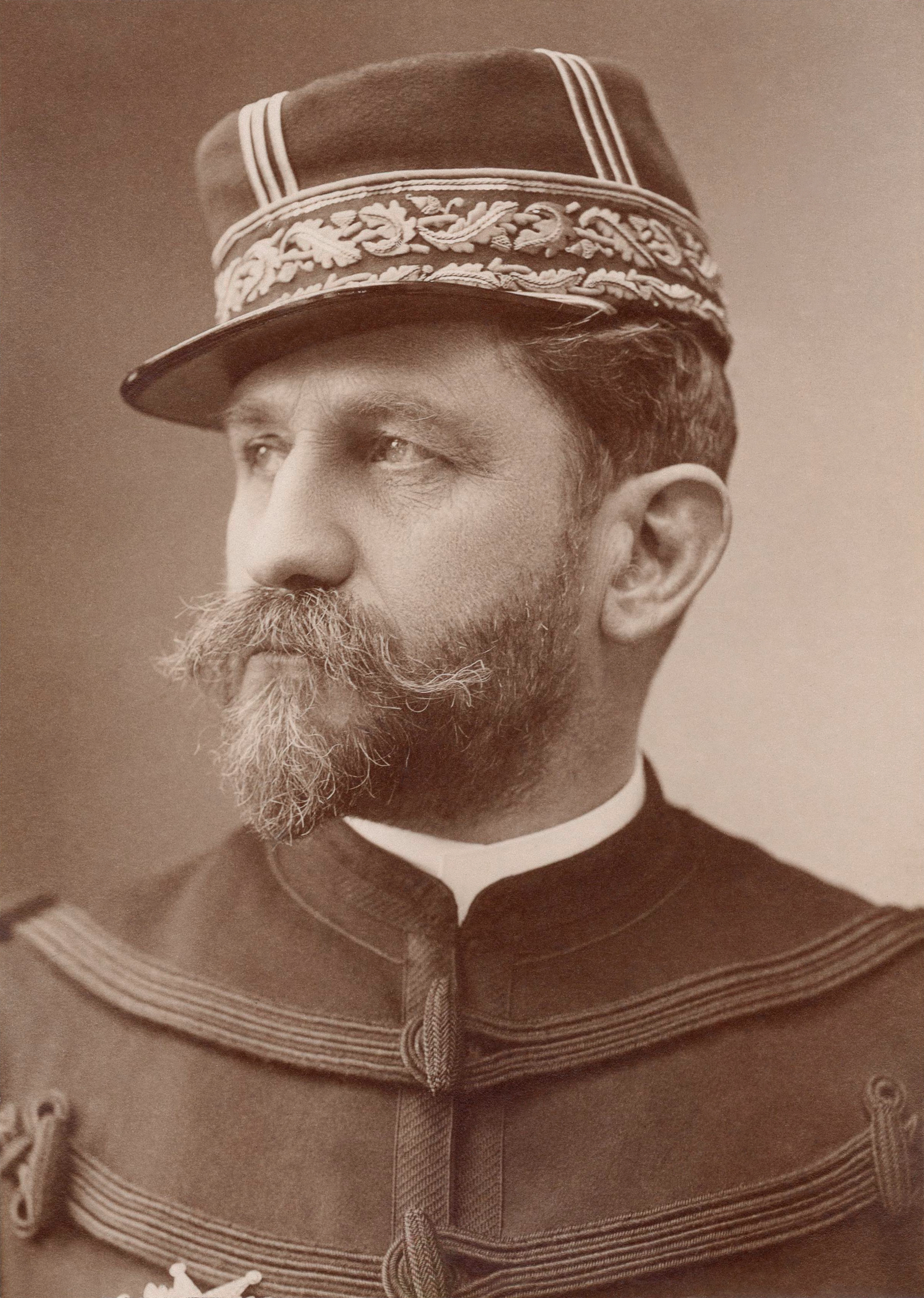
For some analysts, the Republican Front had its origins in the “Republican Defense” movement, which was organized in response to the movement led by General Boulanger in the late 1880s.

Philippe Braud and Olivier Dard link the front républicain to the "republican defense" of the early Third Republic, a strategy aimed at forging the broadest possible electoral alliance (from republican conservatives to socialists) to block monarchists, Bonapartists, and anti-Dreyfusards during a time when the regime's stability was still uncertain. In 1887, to oppose General Boulanger, a "republican concentration" government was formed, bringing together opportunists and radical republicans. Studying the socialists’ stance during the Boulangist crisis, Denis Lefebvre notes that "as early as the 1880s, the question of the front républicain was being raised, even if those exact words were not used. It also involved the vote of socialist voters to defend the Republic and thus republican discipline." He considers that the Society for the Rights of Man and Citizen, founded in May 1888 by Georges Clemenceau, Jules Joffrin, and Arthur Ranc with the mission to "defend the Republic through an uncompromising struggle against any reactionary or dictatorial enterprise," was "a sort of front républicain," adding that the Front National "replicates the rhetoric of General Boulanger, claiming to speak for the people, for the suffering lower classes, denouncing the system and the ruling parties, while professing to bridge the gap between the left and the right." In 1899, during the Dreyfus Affair, the Waldeck-Rousseau cabinet presented itself as a government of "republican defense," uniting radicals, moderate republicans, and one socialist.

Joël Gombin contrasts the lack of a "historical tradition of front républicain" with the "established custom—though not always respected and with varied implementation depending on the voting system—of désistement républicain." This refers to "the commitment made by republican candidates (meaning, in the 1880s, left-wing candidates) to withdraw in favor of the best-placed among them in the second round. While its purpose until 1914 was to safeguard the Republic when its existence was at stake, it later became a mere form of electoral solidarity among the left against reactionary forces. Despite fluctuations, this practice has persisted today, supported by the two-round majority voting system under the Fifth Republic."

Political scientist Laurent Bouvet and historian Jérôme Grondeux connect the concept to the antifascism of the 1930s. Historian Nicolas Lebourg also references this period but as part of the broader "republican discipline," an older tradition that emerged within the left during the Third Republic. This discipline, which included the French Communist Party (PCF) starting with the municipal elections of 1935 and the legislative elections of 1936, involved supporting the best-placed formation in the second round. More specifically, Damon Mayaffre, a specialist in political discourse analysis, observed in 2000 that "the recurring idea of a new front populaire or front républicain against the Front National reflects the complexes of French society in the last decade of the 20th century regarding an alleged lack of vigilance against the rise of the far-right—complexes often fueled by comparisons with the great ancestors of 1936." He argues, however, that these fears are unwarranted: "Even among the early leaders of the Popular Front, a movement presented as exemplary, awareness, willingness, and capacity to mobilize against the fascist threat were neither complete nor entirely clear-headed."

Marc Crapez asserts that the front républicain runs counter to "the principal republican stance in French history," which consists of blocking both the far-right and the far-left—citing, among others, "Jules Ferry's policy of republican concentration" and the Republican Front of 1956. He argues that this stance has been "undermined under the ideological pressure of the far-left on several occasions, notably at the beginning of the 20th century by the policy of the republican bloc under the combisme, and then from 1986 to 2006 by chiraquisme."

Before the Fifth Republic, centrist and right-wing republicans were implicitly excluded from this gathering of "republican forces." Under the Fourth Republic, Gaullists from the Rally of the French People (RPF) were also perceived as a threat and denied inclusion within the republican arc. According to Jérôme Grondeux, "all of this, of course, left lasting traces and made it difficult to proclaim adherence to the principle of the front républicain without arousing suspicions of ulterior motives." Joël Gombin also observes that coalitions defending the republican regime, from the Third Republic to the Republican Front of 1956, "relied on a gathering of left-wing forces." However, the Communist Party was excluded from the latter.

Jérôme Grondeux further notes that "the idea of the front républicain went dormant in the 1960s. The institutions of the Fifth Republic, particularly after 1962, and the majoritarian electoral system for legislative elections entrenched the divide between the right and the left more than ever. Even though moderates on each side were not fundamentally far apart, they were compelled to root themselves firmly within their respective camps. Moreover, until the 1980s, the far-right lacked significant electoral expression, and during that same period, socialism remained a much stronger reference for the left than the Republic itself."

=== An opposite strategy from 1977 to 1986: The alliance of the right ===
During the 1977 municipal elections, some members of the FN—mostly former activists for French Algeria—participated in lists backed by the Independent Republicans in the South of France. In the 1983 municipal elections, a list uniting centrists, Chirac’s supporters, and FN members won in Dreux. This alliance, broadly supported on the right, was publicly endorsed by Jacques Chirac, Valéry Giscard d'Estaing, Alain Juppé, Michel Poniatowski, Jean-Claude Gaudin, Bernard Pons, and Claude Labbé. Only Simone Veil and Bernard Stasi expressed disapproval. During this period, according to political scientist Pascal Perrineau, the principle of the front républicain was established—or, as his colleague Philippe Braud suggests, reemerged. On September 9, 1983, Michel Rocard, then Minister of Agriculture, and Pierre Juquin participated in a demonstration in Dreux "for democracy." Journalist Patrick Roger of Le Monde notes that Michel Rocard was the first "left-wing political leader under the Fifth Republic" to propose, during the 1985 cantonal elections, "the principle of a 'democratic pact,' calling for a transcendence of traditional divisions. [...] He urged voters to support right-wing candidates to defeat the far-right in areas where the left had no chance of winning." This stance contradicted both his party and his government.

From 1983 onward, electoral agreements between the FN and moderate right-wing parties, limited to managing local governments, were justified or downplayed by their leaders. They often invoked the Socialists' governmental and "ideological" alliance with the Communist Party, occasionally framing it as a countermeasure against communism. At a time when the USSR was still in existence and no one imagined it had less than a decade left, right-wing politicians frequently argued that occasional rapprochements with the FN could not reasonably be criticized.

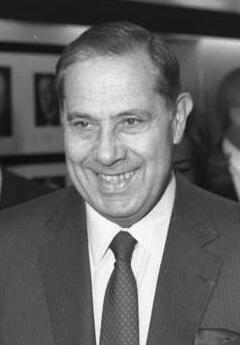
Charles Pasqua was one of the main proponents of the alliance of the Right until 1986.

This strategy of right-wing alliances was particularly championed by Charles Pasqua, whose inner circle included former far-right activists. During the 1983 municipal elections, Pasqua stated: "In a given context, it may appear indispensable and necessary for our local organizations to include representatives from a list that has garnered a certain number of votes, even if that list is led by far-right elements." A few months before the 1984 European elections (where the FN surpassed 10%), Pasqua and Jean-Marie Le Pen, who met frequently, considered launching an "appeal," signed by their associates, for an "alliance" between the RPR and the FN. However, this project was ultimately abandoned. During the 1985 cantonal elections, several FN candidates were covertly supported by Pasqua and his allies, including Marie-Caroline Le Pen in the Neuilly-sur-Seine-Nord canton against Nicolas Sarkozy. That same year, Jacques Chirac declared in Le Quotidien de Paris: "Le Pen does not share my views, but he is not a fascist." In 1986, Chirac approved the alliance formed during the regional elections between the FN and Jean-Claude Gaudin in the Provence-Alpes-Côte d'Azur region. He also proposed a legislative program that aligned closely with the FN's positions. According to Jean-Marie Le Pen, this strategy "was not without ulterior motives, much like Mitterrand with the Communist Party. Pasqua, who lacks neither subtlety nor cunning, often played a double game."

Joël Gombin highlights "numerous indications" that "suggest the Socialist Party (PS) hoped to benefit from the resurgence of the far-right" during this period and sought to "favor [the FN], albeit less overtly." He specifically cites the introduction of proportional representation for the 1986 legislative elections, which allowed the FN to form a parliamentary group.

=== From the "cordon sanitaire" to the Republican Front (1986–2010) ===
==== A new strategy (1986–1998) ====
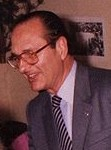
Jacques Chirac set up a “cordon sanitaire” against the FN during the first cohabitation period.

In 1986, Laurent Fabius raised the possibility of a Republican withdrawal strategy against the FN in preparation for the legislative elections, but the idea gained little traction. The term "cordon sanitaire" appeared for the first time in France in a manifesto published in Le Monde in 1987, written by Jean-Christophe Cambadélis and signed by 122 personalities. Academic Pierre Ecuvillon views this as "both a symbolic passing of the torch from the moral prohibition imposed by SOS Racisme to a political interdiction that would quickly become a norm, and a circumstantial reaction partly motivated by Jean-Marie Le Pen's misstep" regarding his remarks on "AIDS victims." Ecuvillon calls it "the first step in imposing a constraint on all French political actors," though it was "not the most decisive." Lionel Jospin and Jean-Pierre Chevènement distanced themselves from the manifesto.

The cordon sanitaire strategy took shape during the first cohabitation government, with an official refusal of alliances on the right. Jacques Chirac personally instructed members of his majority to avoid interacting with deputies from the FN-Rassemblement National group and even refrained from addressing them. Chirac also abandoned his hardline "rightward" policy. In his first speech in the National Assembly, Jean-Marie Le Pen condemned what he called "lies, slander, insults, and disinformation" that allegedly marked the electoral campaign. He accused Jacques Chirac of having "defied the country by imposing a kind of political apartheid on us, symbolized naively yesterday by the fact that the seats surrounding us were empty as if you thought we could transmit AIDS!—political AIDS, that is, for I hope we are above suspicion in this area!" Jean Lecanuet described the speech as "well-crafted," while Valéry Giscard d'Estaing called it "warm and lively." Although refusing to give a vote of confidence to Jacques Chirac's government, Jean-Marie Le Pen positioned himself within an "anti-Marxist, anti-socialist majority" and expressed willingness to support individual legislative proposals. According to Nicolas Lebourg, Le Pen hoped to "be called into government, dreaming of the Ministry of Defense," but also supported the cordon sanitaire strategy, fearing his deputies might be "tempted to join parties that were more socially acceptable and offered greater social and financial capital." However, his infamous statement on September 17, 1987—"I haven’t studied the issue specifically, but I believe [the gas chambers] are a detail of World War II history"—undermined any potential rapprochement with the FN. Events such as the Malik Oussekine affair (late 1986) and the desecration of the Jewish cemetery in Carpentras (1990) further solidified the divide.

Pascal Perrineau notes that "Jacques Chirac, after adopting some ambiguous positions in the mid-1980s, gradually came to view the National Rally as a threat to the Republic, its values of liberty, equality, and fraternity, and, beyond that, as endangering France's integration into Europe and the world." Marc Crapez, however, argues that Chirac's new stance was "dictated by left-wing intellectuals" and even involved "electing Communists over FN candidates." Mathias Bernard suggests that "one key to the separation between the right and the far-right during the 1990s" lies in "the rupture between the Socialists and Communists (July 1984), the fall of the Eastern Bloc (1989–1991), and the electoral decline of the Communist Party." These developments "significantly weakened the anti-communist narrative."

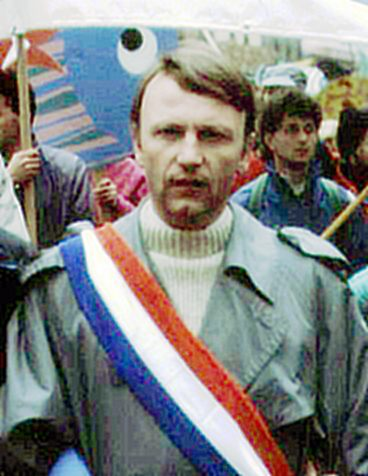
Antoine Waechter, a leading figure in the Green Party in the 1980s, opposes the Republican Front strategy to a section of his party.

The electoral alliance of the right-wing parties continues to be mentioned by certain RPR officials, even as the issue of immigration begins to be politicized within the RPR around the early 1990s. After the 1986 regional elections, several regions (notably PACA) are co-managed by the right and the far right. In the spring of 1987, Jacques Chirac summoned Alain Juppé, Michèle Barzach, and Alain Carignon, who supported Michel Noir’s anti-FN stance, to inform them that he favored Charles Pasqua’s strategy for the 1988 presidential election. During the runoff period, Pasqua stated that the RPR and FN shared “common values.” During the 1988 legislative elections, a mutual withdrawal agreement was established between the RPR, UDF, and FN against the PS in the PACA region. Following the elections, Jean-Marie Le Pen, acting on the advice of Jean-Pierre Stirbois, expressed a desire for a “national discipline,” which, modeled after the “republican discipline” on the left, would impose reciprocal support for the list leading after the first round among the right-wing parties. That same year, Chirac ordered Pasqua to cease all relations with the president of the FN. Pasqua, in turn, claimed that “Chirac was ‘compromised’ and had always been in collusion with Mitterrand, having facilitated his election in 1981 before Mitterrand returned the favor in 1995.” The 1988 legislative elections thus marked the final local agreements between the right and the far right, symbolizing a progressive rupture between the two camps.

The left also experiences tensions on this issue. At the end of 1989, during the partial legislative elections in the second constituencies of Eure-et-Loir and Bouches-du-Rhône, the Socialist Party (PS) is divided over the appropriateness of calling for a republican front. Joël Gombin notes that this is the year when "the expression itself seems to have resurfaced," with the PS, despite its internal divisions, calling for votes in favor of right-wing candidates to defeat those from the FN. Pierre Mauroy led this initiative, then the first secretary of the Socialist Party, and Michel Rocard, then Prime Minister. However, this overture was rejected by Alain Juppé, then secretary general of the RPR. The Greens are also divided over the strategy to adopt, despite their unanimous condemnation of the FN on a values level. One faction seeks to block the path of any FN candidate, while another, "championed by Antoine Waechter, argues that it is essential to address the causes of xenophobia rather than merely its symptom. For them, there is no question of advocating a Republican Front against the National Rally or withdrawing in favor of any candidate opposing an FN candidate in the second round." In 1991, national parties officially condemned any alliance between their candidates and the National Rally.

During the period when Jacques Chirac and Alain Juppé jointly led the RPR, with one as president and the other as secretary general between 1988 and 1995, and during the first two years of Jacques Chirac’s presidency (1995-1997), when Alain Juppé served as Prime Minister while also leading the RPR, the two men were instructed to keep the left and the FN at arm’s length in the case of a second round. This policy led, for example, to Alain Carignon facing an expulsion procedure in June 1990 when he called for votes for the PS in the second round of a partial canton election in Villeurbanne. In May 1995, Henri Emmanuelli rejected the possibility of a republican withdrawal against the FN, only to reverse his position on the evening of the first round of the presidential election. "That same evening, Philippe Séguin also mentioned a possible 'republican front,' to ally with all parliamentary parties to prevent the extreme right from winning municipal offices" during the June municipal elections.

During these elections, the Gaullist movement, led by Jean-François Mancel, rejected the republican front, while the UDF and the PS sought to assess its application case by case. However, Le Monde argued that the PS, under the influence of Lionel Jospin and Laurent Fabius, invented the principle of "republican withdrawal" by asking two of its lists to withdraw in Marignane and Dreux, where FN candidates had made it to the second round. On July 21, 1995, Martine Aubry called in Le Monde to "beware of the idea of a republican front... We must avoid any political strategy that would give the impression that the differences between what the right proposes and what we want to undertake are, ultimately, minimal, and that, in the end, both the right and the left are more or less satisfied with the society in which we live." Political scientist Bruno Villalba believes that it was along this line that, "especially from September 1996, this strategy was generally abandoned by the RPR, UDF, PCF, and PS." Nonetheless, "as shown by the 1996 Gardanne by-election, local right-wing leaders (such as Jean-Claude Gaudin [...]) openly preferred to see a communist deputy elected rather than favoring the FN's establishment."

In 1997, Charles Pasqua stated that "the leaders of the National Rally" were "closer" to "fascists" than "anything else," and that they "were not republicans." That same year, Jean-Pierre Delalande, an RPR deputy from Val-d'Oise, who led a study group on the FN, presented his findings to the RPR political bureau, which included rejecting the republican front. On his part, RPR senator Alain Peyrefitte called for "uniting the right-wing opposition," while specifying: "As long as Mr. Le Pen remains at the head of the FN, no alliance with this party seems acceptable either to it or to him." Between 1997 and 1999, Nicolas Sarkozy and Philippe Séguin, respectively secretary general and president of the RPR, severely sanctioned any rapprochement with the National Rally. At the FN, Bruno Mégret proposed establishing a "national discipline" based on reciprocal withdrawals between RPR-UDF candidates and the FN, but Jean-Marie Le Pen firmly opposed it.

==== Marginalization of the National Rally and the peak of the Republican Front (1998–2010) ====
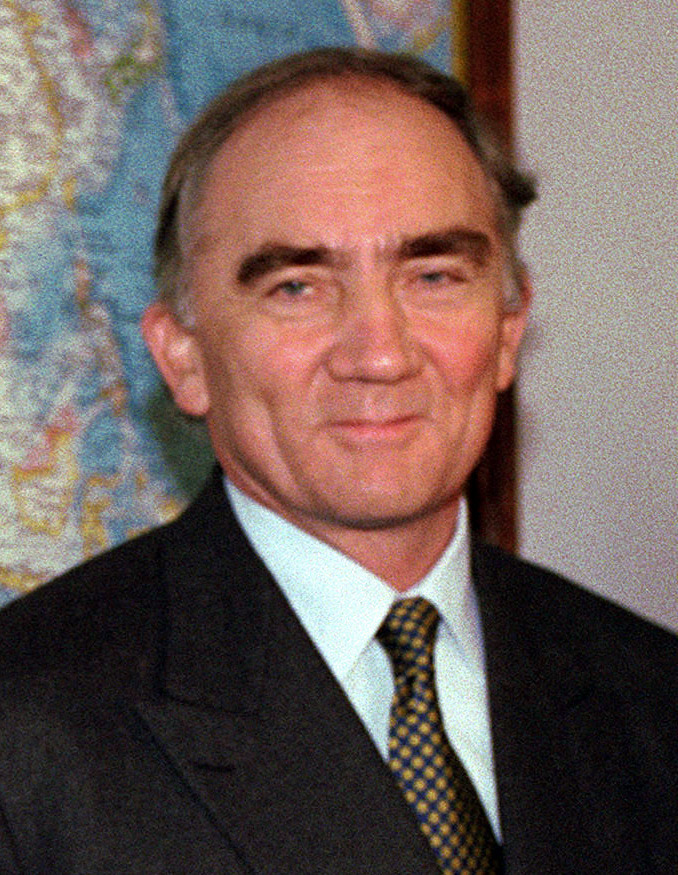
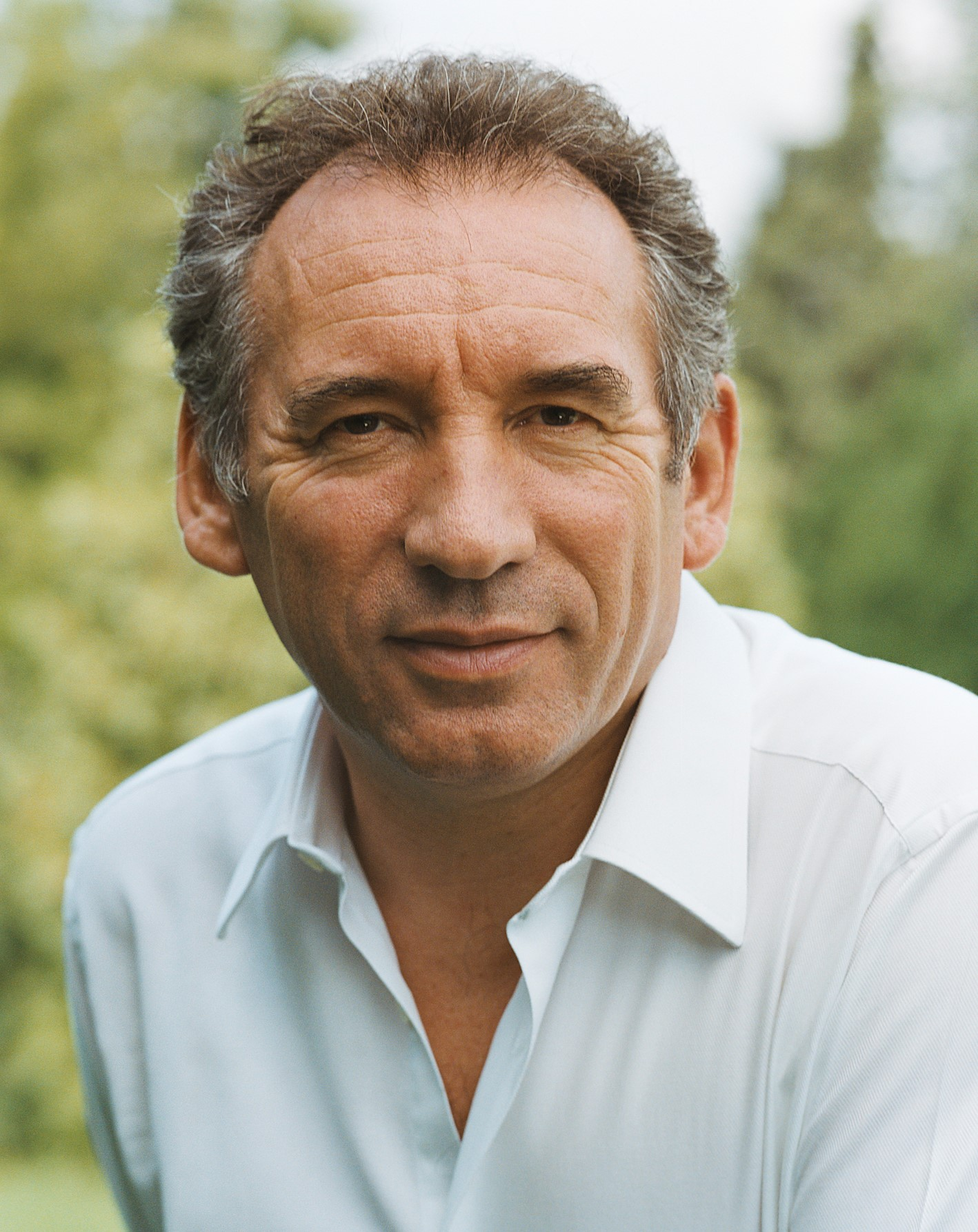
Similar to the RPR, the UDF was torn apart during the 1998 regional elections over relations with the FN. While Charles Millon (top) sought to ally himself with FN representatives in the Rhône-Alpes region, François Bayrou (bottom) remained faithful to the Republican front line, which won the day.

In the 1998 regional elections, the FN proposed an alliance contract to the right-wing parties with a minimal program written by Bruno Gollnisch, which was accepted in several regions. Implemented by Bruno Mégret, this strategy was supported by Jean-Marie Le Pen, who clarified: “What Bruno Mégret proposed is nothing but the strict application of the national discipline doctrine adopted by the political bureau; there is no divergence on this matter.” (Note: According to Nicolas Lebourg and Joseph Beauregard, Jean-Marie Le Pen attempts to complicate the alliance's efforts by prioritizing national-Catholics in the candidate lists he assembles. (Lebourg & Beauregard 2012, p. 188).) While only 36% of right-wing sympathizers supported local agreements with the FN at that time, Jacques Chirac, president of the RPR, and François Léotard, president of the UDF, condemned this attitude, and the six heads of the list involved resigned one after the other. In Rhône-Alpes, university presidents refused to meet with the new UDF president Charles Millon, and protests erupted in Lyon to oppose his alliance with the FN. After his removal, “RPR and UDF ‘Millonists’ and ‘anti-Millonists’ tore each other apart, constantly changing positions and alliances—one of the few consistently right-wing politicians during this time was François Bayrou, who called for a republican front.” Édouard Balladur had also considered a “pact” with the FN during these elections. These elections marked a turning point in the history of relations between the governing right and the FN for many observers, including Jean-Marie Le Pen: “If Chirac had not put all his resources into the balance, the right would have folded in 1998, and relations with the FN would have normalized.” These elections are cited by Pascal Delwit, Jean-Michel De Waele, and Andrea Rea to emphasize that, unlike in Belgium, where a "sanitary cordon" was established against Vlaams Belang, “a union dynamic against the National Rally could not be realized in France, where the left/right divide is so rigid that it prevents thinking about a coalition against the FN.” On the contrary, Pascal Perrineau considers that “the shock of 1998 led to a reinforcement of the republican front strategy.”

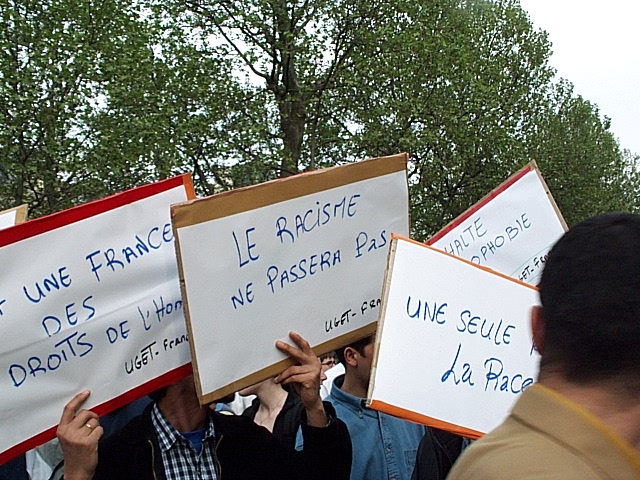
Signs at the May 1st, 2002 demonstration in Paris.

The most famous use of the republican front occurred during the 2002 presidential election, when all the candidates failing to reach the second round, except Arlette Laguiller and Daniel Gluckstein, as well as civil society and the media, widely and successfully called to “block” or more explicitly vote for Jacques Chirac in the second round against Jean-Marie Le Pen. (Note: The French Communist Party notably calls for a vote for Jacques Chirac. Source: Rochefort, Robert (2002). La France déboussolée [France in disarray] (in French). Éditions Odile Jacob. p. 173. For his part, Olivier Besancenot, candidate of the Revolutionary Communist League, calls for blocking Jean-Marie Le Pen but refrains from endorsing Jacques Chirac, believing that Chirac "is not a bulwark against Le Pen." Source: "Interview with Olivier Besancenot". 2002. Archived from the original on May 13, 2021.) The behavior of the left in this instance follows a long tradition of opposition to the far right, while Jacques Chirac referred, during the interval between the two rounds, to his refusal of any alliance with the FN. Joël Gombin observes that with this episode, Jacques Chirac “became the icon of the defense of the Republic, somewhat despite himself: contrary to some historical revisions, we cannot consider that he was always so uncompromising.” Jérôme Grondeux highlights the unprecedented aspect of the republican front observed during this election: “Originating from the left, the idea of the republican front exclusively benefited the right in the second round: for the first time, it was the socialist political projects that the National Rally obstructed.” For Gaël Brustier and Fabien Escalona, April 21, 2002 “only reinforces the return to the strategy of the sanitary cordon” observed in 1998. This strategy is illustrated by the posters of the Young Socialists saying “Vote crook, not fascist,” which refer to the scandals of Jacques Chirac’s presidency, a choice that would be commented on in various ways later. On the left, Noël Mamère’s voters are proportionally the ones who most supported Jacques Chirac in the second round (84%); on the right, it was those of Corinne Lepage (96%). In contrast, voters of Bruno Mégret, Jean Saint-Josse (73%), Robert Hue (77%), Jean-Pierre Chevènement, and Olivier Besancenot shifted less toward the incumbent president than the rest of the electorate. Moreover, women were significantly more likely than men to have chosen him (89% versus 74%), while manual workers and self-employed individuals were less likely to reject the FN candidate compared to other professional groups. The formation of a republican front uniting the left and right in the second round of the subsequent legislative elections was more often approved by female voters than by male voters.

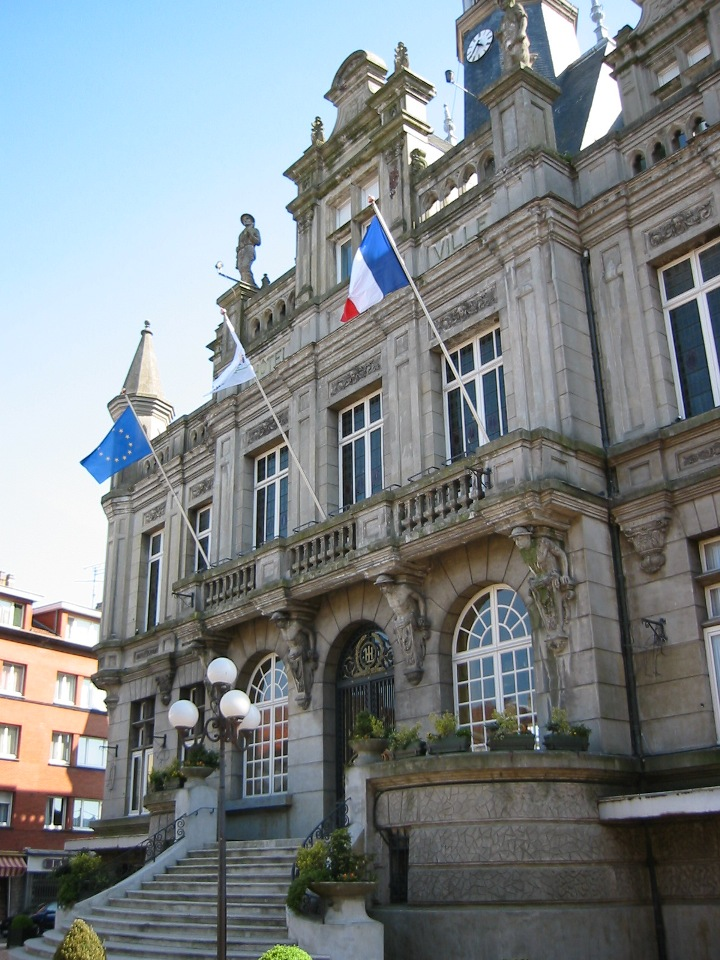
The 2009 municipal election in Hénin-Beaumont (town hall above) saw a rare case of a Republican front supported by the UMP leadership in favor of a left-wing candidate.

Jérôme Grondeux argues that during the 1990s and 2000s, “the right does not claim the ‘republican front,’ which is not part of its heritage. It somewhat endures it.” Joël Gombin rejects the idea of a “golden age” of the republican front during this period: “At most, one can observe the existence, and consolidation after 1998, of a form of ‘sanitary cordon’ that excludes explicit alliances with the far right—even if it has had some setbacks here and there.” On the contrary, Pascal Perrineau states that “a true culture of the republican front takes root” after the 2002 presidential election: “The republican right stands firm on its refusal of any direct or indirect compromise with the National Rally in the 2004 regional elections.” On this occasion, despite initial reluctance from voters and candidates in southeastern France regarding the formation of a republican front, the left widened its lead in the second round when facing the FN. In the 2007 legislative elections, a republican front formed in the 14th constituency of Pas-de-Calais (which includes the canton of Hénin-Beaumont): among the eliminated parties, only the Movement for France did not call for a vote for Marine Le Pen’s socialist opponent; she also received support from Paul-Marie Coûteaux. In the 2009 partial municipal elections in Hénin-Beaumont, Steeve Briois' list again faced a republican front supporting the left-wing and republican candidate. The UMP officially supported this position in a statement. However, Nicolas Sarkozy wished to exclude the call for a republican front in favor of a “voting directive for a republican candidate,” while Valérie Pécresse and Gérard Longuet expressed more nuanced positions.

=== Decline of the Republican Front in the face of the FN's electoral resurgence (2011–present) ===
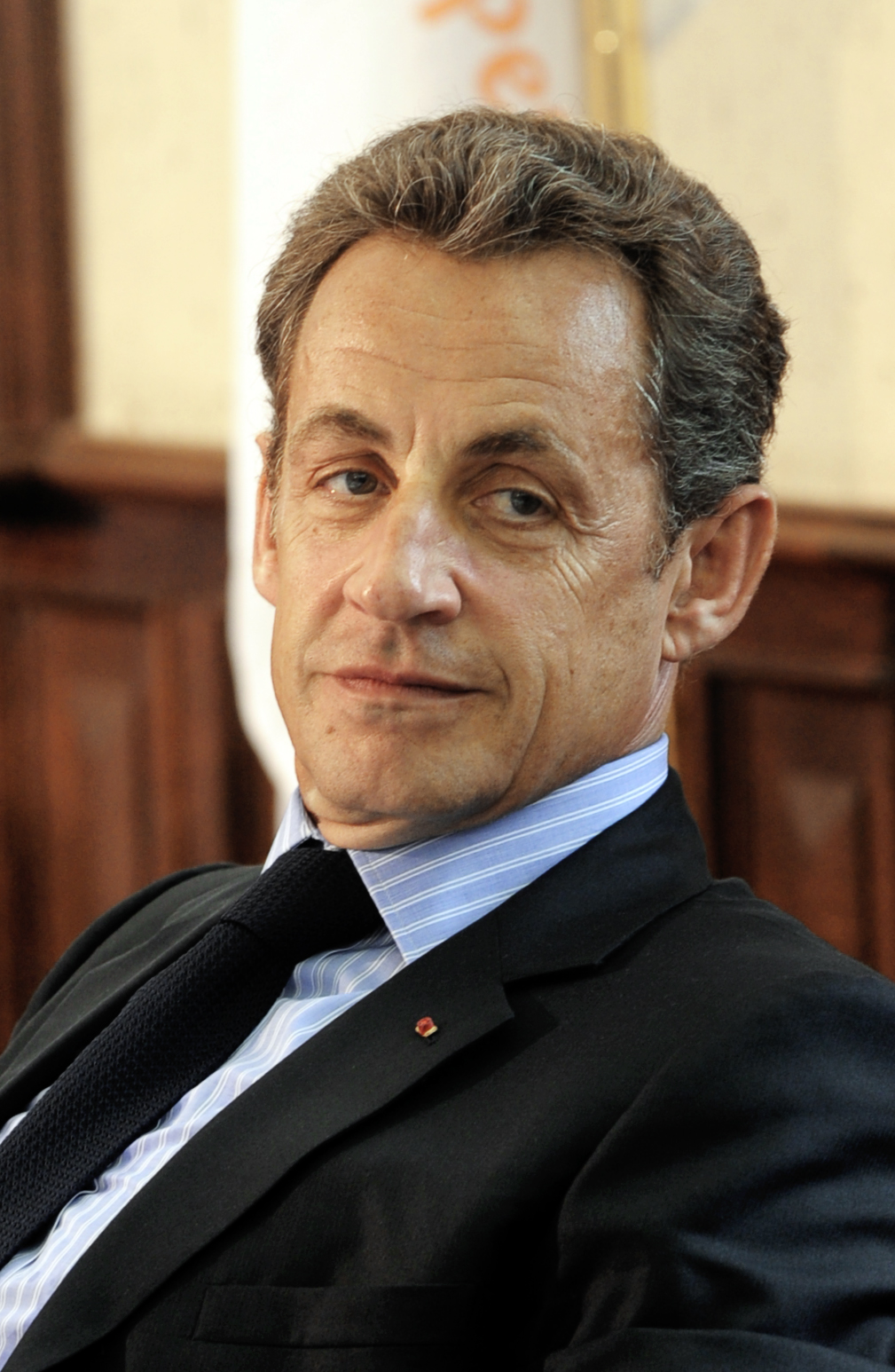
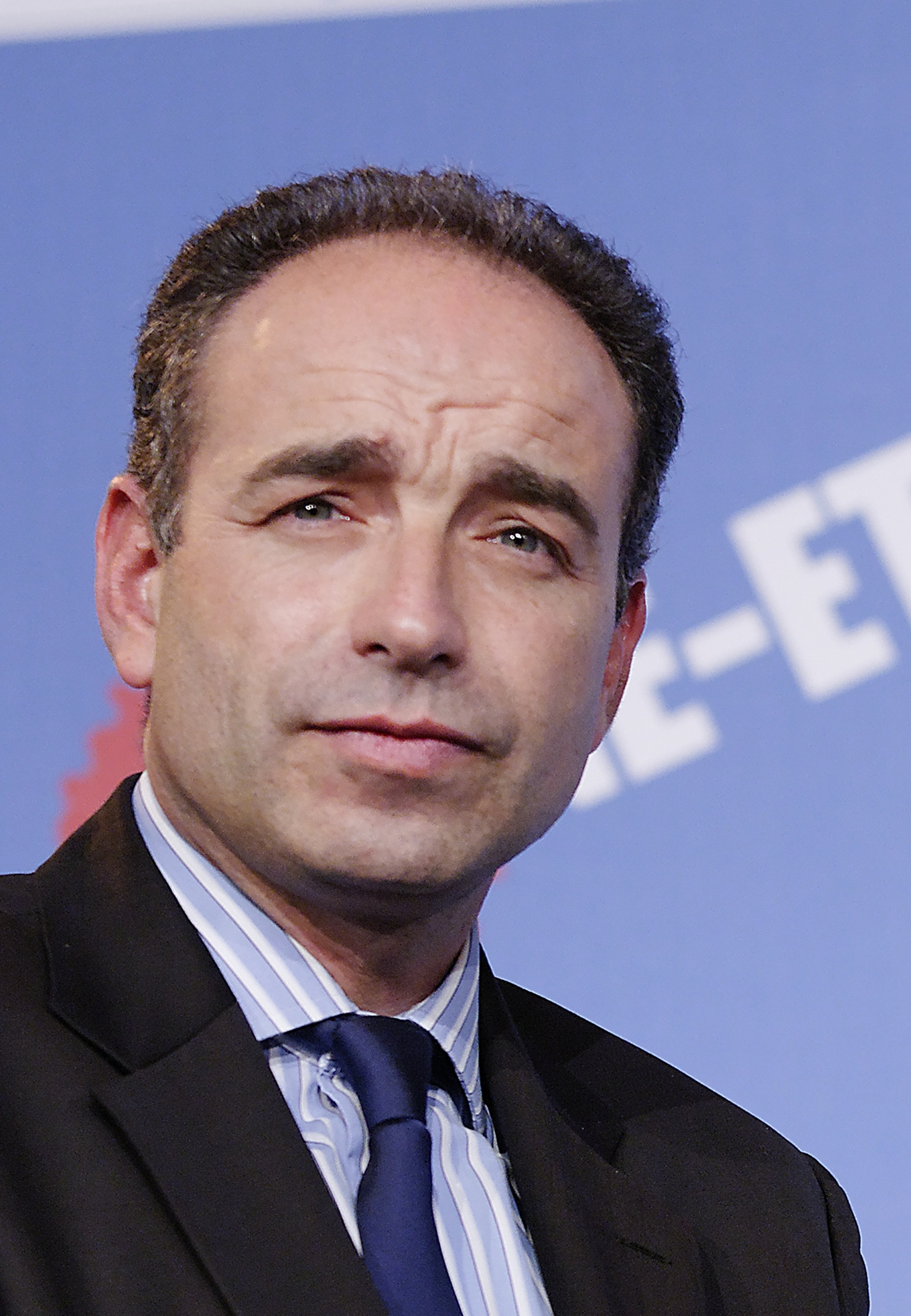
Nicolas Sarkozy and Jean-François Copé imposed the “ni-ni” rule on the UMP during the 2011 cantonal elections.

After a weakening of the FN at the local level during the 2000s, the party experienced a resurgence in the 2010 regional elections. In the 2011 cantonal elections, Nicolas Sarkozy, President of the Republic, and Jean-François Copé, Secretary General of the UMP, imposed the rule of "neither FN nor PS in the second round," commonly abbreviated as "ni-ni"—Copé had supported this directive since 1999. The UMP justifies this approach, notably due to the PS's alliances with the Left Front. According to academic Jean-Yves Heurtebise, this strategy "is politically the best: neither the UMP nor the FN has an interest in creating a union of the right," as evidenced by the decline of the PCF since the Common Program and the experience of plural left-wing governance for the PS. On the other hand, Pascal Perrineau perceives a "rupture... revealing not only the electoral pressure the FN is placing on the UMP but also the ideological shifts the latter has undergone during Nicolas Sarkozy's presidency." The press also reports a turnaround, while Prime Minister François Fillon and the centrists call for the republican front. The FN won several victories in these elections, followed by the 2012 legislative elections. The usefulness of this "republican front" is increasingly questioned as its voters no longer effectively act as a barrier, either by voting against the recommendations of the governing parties or abstaining. The New Anti-Capitalist Party, for its part, calls on its voters to support "the left-wing candidate when they are still in the race against the National Rally" in the second round of the 2011 cantonal elections but opposes the idea of a republican front, which would imply voting UMP against the FN.

Neither Valérie Pécresse nor Nathalie Kosciusko-Morizet, who publicly called for voting PS in a second-round duel between the PS and FN, were excluded from the UMP despite differing from the national directive. The same applies to Roland Chassain, who withdrew in favor of a National Rally candidate in the 2012 legislative elections to block the socialist Michel Vauzelle. Jean-François Copé had announced that he would request his exclusion from the UMP's political office.

In March 2013, during the by-election in the second constituency of Oise, the FN candidate, although she lost in the second round, gained 6,000 votes between the two rounds, compared to 2,885 for the winner, Jean-François Mancel. Between 40% and 43% of socialist voters in the first round reportedly switched their vote to the far-right candidate in the second round. In June 2013, during the by-election in the third constituency of Lot-et-Garonne, the strong increase in the FN candidate’s votes between the two rounds led Marine Le Pen to declare that "the so-called 'republican front' is dead." According to Joël Gombin, since "the ideological distance between the far-right and the UMP is smaller than it was before 2002," it is "not surprising that left-wing voters are increasingly reluctant to follow instructions calling for a vote for the UMP or against the FN." He adds that the UMP's "ni-ni" stance might also push socialist candidates to reject the republican front in reciprocity. A BVA Opinion poll for L'Express, La Presse Régionale, and France Inter indicates that, in the event of a second-round FN/PS duel, 41% of UMP sympathizers would prefer their party to call for abstention or a blank vote; 35% would prefer it to call for a vote for the FN candidate; and only 23% want the UMP to call for a republican front. In contrast, 69% of socialist sympathizers would prefer the PS to urge voters to support the UMP candidate in a UMP/FN duel. In October 2013, during the by-election in Brignoles, Laurent Lopez, the FN candidate, was elected as a general councilor of Var with 53.9% of the vote, a significantly more comfortable margin than his predecessor in 2011.

This principle of the republican front is again relevant for the 2014 municipal elections, where, faced with the rise of the FN in certain municipalities, leaders of the Socialist Party, the Greens, the Communists, and the UDI call for its establishment to block the far-right candidates, as do certain civil society figures, such as Laurence Parisot. The UMP, on the other hand, remains faithful to its so-called "ni-ni" doctrine. On the ground, these instructions are followed in various ways, with varying results. Many observers believe that the republican front is "dead."

After rejecting the strategy of the republican front during the municipal elections, Alain Juppé declared in October 2014, as a candidate in his party's primary for the 2017 presidential election, that in the face of a Front National candidate, he would accept a republican front, provided the left-wing candidate was "a social democrat and not a red." During the 2015 by-election in the fourth constituency of Doubs, he called for a vote in the second round for Frédéric Barbier, the PS candidate against Sophie Montel, the FN candidate, emphasizing that the latter "believes, among other things, in the 'obvious inequality of races.'" On the left, the automaticity of the republican front is challenged by PS deputies Razzy Hammadi and Yann Galut, as well as by Jean-Luc Mélenchon. Joël Gombin says, "it seems that the more a left-wing political actor is critically positioned in relation to the Socialist majority, the less the call for the republican front is self-evident."

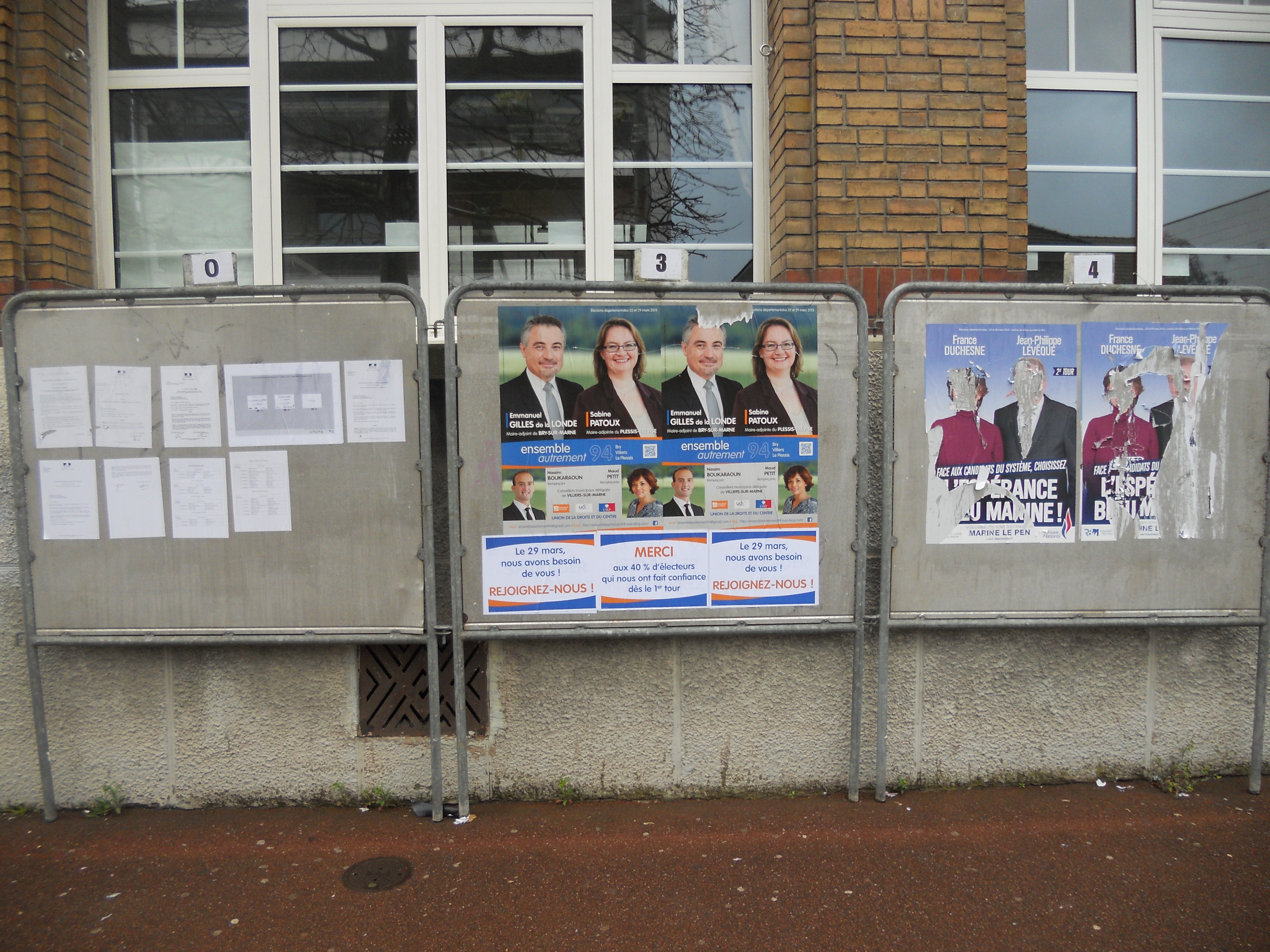
Election signs for the second round of the 2015 departmental elections in the canton of Villiers-sur-Marne (95). The vote pitted the Union of the Right (UMP, UDI, and Modem) against the Front National. It is particularly in such a situation that left-wing parties call for a Republican front.

In the 2015 departmental elections, the "ni-ni" line reaffirmed by Nicolas Sarkozy, then president of the UMP, was broken by Jean-Paul Fournier, the UMP senator-mayor of Nîmes and secretary of the UMP in the Gard department, who called for a republican front for the seven left-FN duels that took place in the 23 cantons of the department. He recalled that he had "already called for a vote for a communist facing the FN in the second round of a Nîmes canton election." In Aisne, three right-wing duos decided to withdraw in the second round, even though they could have contested the triangular elections, against the advice of Christophe Coulon, secretary of the UMP in the department. In Nord, UMP senator Jean-René Lecerf, considered the favorite to preside over the departmental council, called for a republican front, including communist or Left Front candidates. In the fall of 2014, he had stated his willingness to ally with the PS in the second round of the 2015 regional elections to face the Front National. On the left, all the parties eliminated in the first round called to "block the FN," except for the Left Party, which in many territories preferred to let voters "make their choices in conscience." However, in some departments, PS candidates continued into the second round and caused triangular elections with their party's support, which made an exception to the Republican front rule, considering that these candidates objectively had more chances to reverse the situation. The NPA, for its part, called for defeating the FN in the second round of the departmental elections if it faced the left, while refusing to prefer the UMP over Marine Le Pen's party. In the end, the FN was defeated in the second round in most cases where left or right-wing candidates called to block it. Jérôme Fourquet from Ifop indicates that in the 21 cantons where the left withdrew, creating an FN/right duel, the right defeated the FN in all cases: "The republican withdrawal worked very well when practiced by the left. And in most cases, the FN was widely defeated in the second round by the right. However, the margin was small in a few cantons (Péronne, Saint-Gilles, or Bapaume)." Furthermore, the left won in four of the six cantons where the right withdrew, with the FN winning in the cantons of Guise and Corbie. Finally, in the eleven cantons where the left remained, causing a triangular election (and won 7, benefiting from a majority left bloc), few left-wing voters in the first round practiced a "grassroots republican front" by switching to the right-wing candidate in the second round.

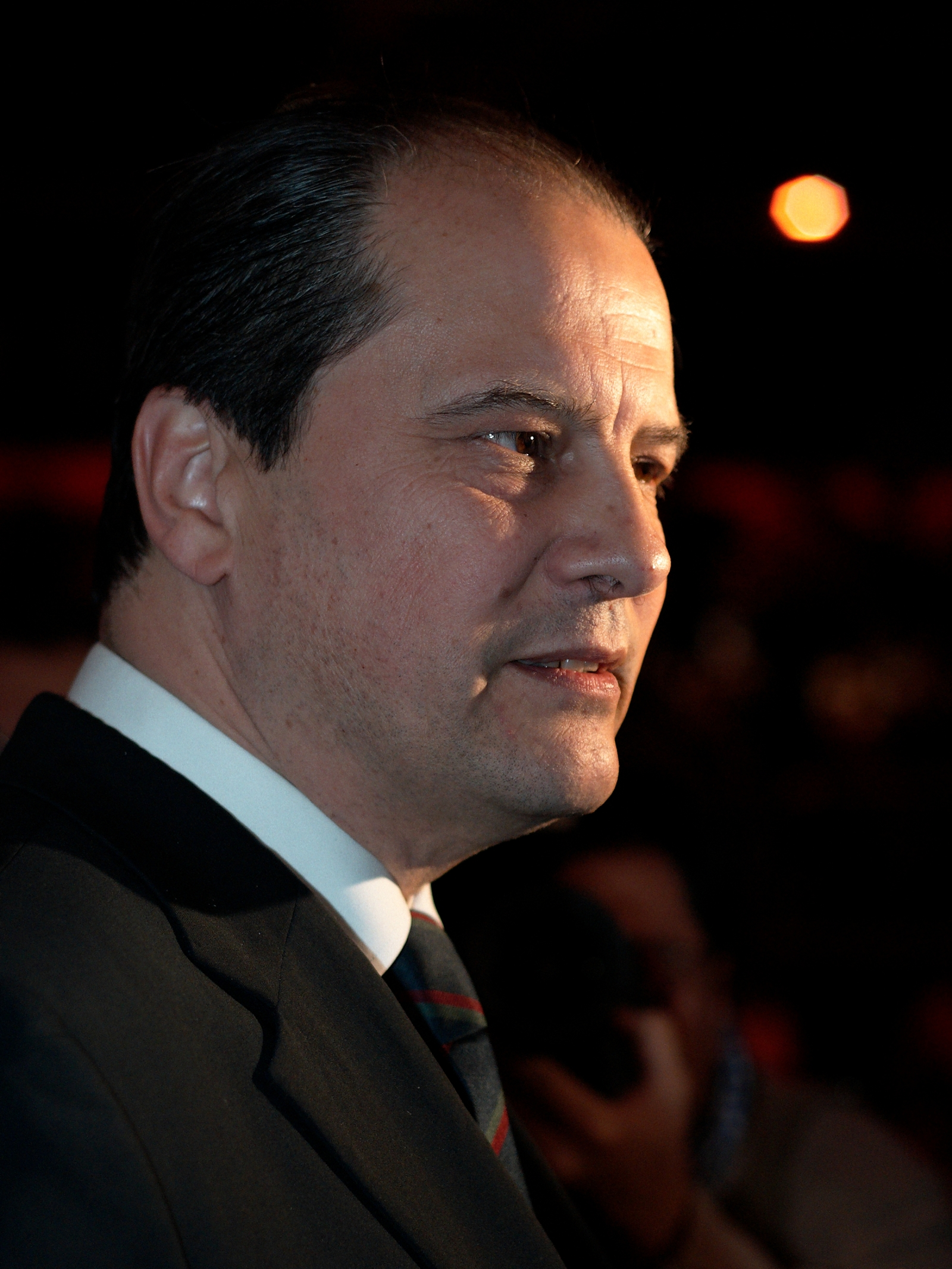
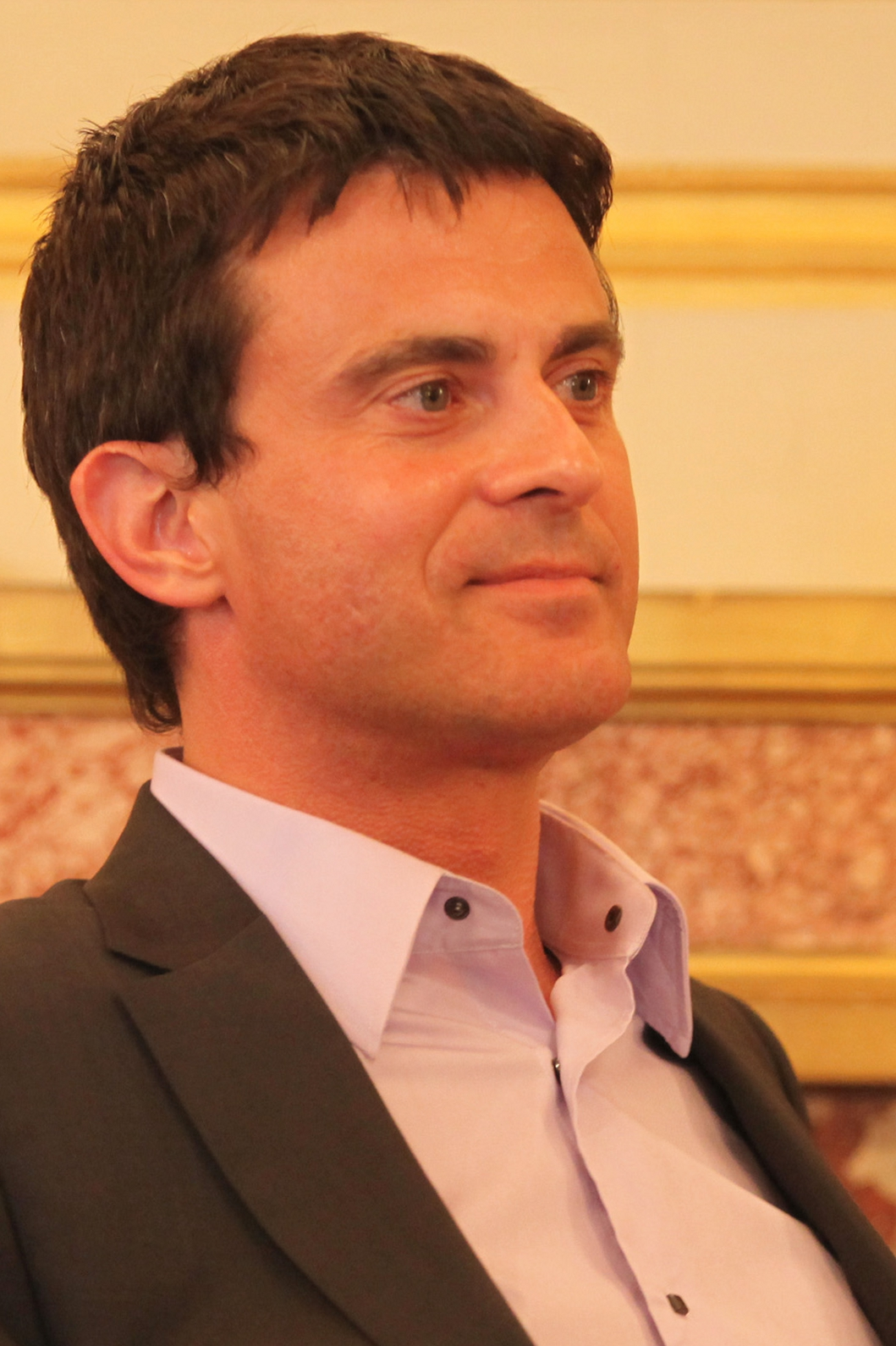
The Socialist Party is divided over whether to apply the Republican front to the 2015 regional elections: while First Secretary Jean-Christophe Cambadélis (top) is considering abandoning this strategy, Prime Minister Manuel Valls (bottom) is in favor of merging lists with the Republicans between the two rounds if the FN comes out on top.

While it had never faced the hypothesis of a withdrawal in a regional election, the PS was divided on the issue for the 2015 regional elections. Jérôme Fourquet from Ifop emphasized that the PS would face a "Hobson's choice" if it qualified for the second round in third place: "stay in the race at the risk of letting the FN win and take responsibility for it; merge with the right (which the right refuses) offering the FN the 'UMPS' argument; or withdraw the list, which implies disappearing from the regional landscape and having no elected representatives in the Regional Council for five years, an extremely painful sacrifice for a party whose network of local elected officials had already been heavily strained by the defeats of the municipal and departmental elections in 2014." In September 2015, Jean-Christophe Cambadélis, PS First Secretary, declared in an interview with Libération that "the extremist declarations of Christian Estrosi [head of list for the Republicans (LR) in Provence-Alpes-Côte d'Azur (PACA)] and Xavier Bertrand [head of list LR in Nord-Pas-de-Calais-Picardie (NPDCP)] on refugees now prevent the republican front." This directive was analyzed in the press as a "turnaround" by the PS and as "a true political turning point." For his part, President François Hollande privately stated that the PS "would make case-by-case decisions." Prime Minister Manuel Valls initially expressed "skepticism" about applying the republican front in these elections, but then stated that "everything would be done to prevent the FN from winning." At the end of October 2015, Manuel Valls implicitly supported the republican front again, while Jean-Christophe Cambadélis modified his position by stating that he "excluded nothing." Valls then expressed, in a small committee, support for a merger of PS and the Republicans lists between the two rounds in an attempt to prevent the FN from winning in several regions, particularly in NPDCP, considering the republican front insufficient to support the best-placed candidate against the FN. At the same time, he discussed the possibility of a left-right coalition for the 2017 presidential election. Several socialist leaders considered these remarks premature or even counterproductive, and Pierre de Saintignon, head of the PS list in NPDCP, reacted strongly. According to Europe 1, François Hollande was completely opposed to this hypothesis. Some analysts explained Manuel Valls' position as his desire to be as combative as possible against the FN, to adapt to the new tripartite political configuration, and to eventually create a "common house" of progressives, ranging from socialists to moderate right-wingers. Researcher Nicolas Lebourg believes the PS has no interest in withdrawing from the second round, as doing so would make it the "victim" of the republican front and put it in a position of indistinction from its offer. "A republican front in December would be like a super-April 21, 2017."

Between the two rounds, the political bureau of The Republicans (LR) almost unanimously adopts the position defended by Nicolas Sarkozy, "neither withdrawal nor fusion." Only Jean-Pierre Raffarin and Nathalie Kosciusko-Morizet challenge this line; the latter is excluded from the party leadership for this reason. While Dominique Reynié, the leader of the united right list that came third in Languedoc-Roussillon-Midi-Pyrénées, stays in the second round, Christophe Castaner and Pierre de Saintignon, heads of the PS lists in PACA and Nord-Pas-de-Calais-Picardie, withdraw. In contrast, in Alsace-Champagne-Ardenne-Lorraine, Jean-Pierre Masseret remains, against the PS's advice, invoking the inefficiency of the republican front in pushing back the FN. Ultimately, he is defeated in all configurations, notably due to a significant transfer of votes from socialist voters in the first round to right-wing lists in the second round in NPDCP (82.2%) and PACA (58.9%). In return, Xavier Bertrand and Christian Estrosi, winners in NPDCP and PACA respectively, announce the establishment of consultation mechanisms with local left-wing representatives as part of their governance.

Gaël Brustier and Fabien Escalona explain the divisions within the UMP and later The Republicans regarding the republican front, partly by "a differentiated apprehension of the issue depending on the geographical positioning of various political leaders," and partly by "the expression of a plurality of ideological conceptions about what French right-wing politics should become after the disappearance of the major political traditions that existed after 1945 (Gaullism, Christian democracy...)." They note that the sanitary cordon is still respected on the right, where its practice "has been, and remains, less evident," "on the one hand because the FN does not seek so much to support the classical right but to eliminate it, and on the other hand because the institutional and electoral rules of the Fifth Republic have effectively protected the dominant parties from any outsider."

Pascal Perrineau observes that in 2013, the sympathizers of the two main right-wing parties (UMP and UDI) were divided on the possibility of an agreement with the FN for local elections, while they were largely opposed to such an agreement at the national level: "The situation has evolved significantly compared to the 1990s when more than two-thirds of RPR and UDF supporters declared they did not want their parties to form an alliance with the Front National in the second round of an election." Valérie Igounet highlights that "from the end of 2010 to the spring of 2014, half of the right-wing electorate expressed support for agreements. Since then, about 30% of the right-wing electorate has once again expressed support for an alliance between their camp and the FN. A key factor explaining this shift is the result of the May 2014 European elections. For the first time, the FN finished at the top in terms of votes."

During the 2016 Republican presidential primary campaign, Nicolas Sarkozy declared that he would vote for François Hollande rather than Marine Le Pen if they both faced each other in the second round of the 2017 presidential election, thus reversing the "ni-ni" strategy.

Of the nine candidates eliminated in the first round of the 2017 presidential election, where Marine Le Pen and Emmanuel Macron qualified, only François Fillon and Benoît Hamon explicitly called for voting for Emmanuel Macron—Benoît Hamon issued this call immediately after the results were announced, while Lionel Jospin had waited five days in 2002 before calling for voting for Jacques Chirac—, the republican front weakening into calls for a barrier against the far-right party; Nicolas Dupont-Aignan, for his part, concludes a "government agreement" with Marine Le Pen. The political bureau of LR adopts a compromise position calling to "vote against Marine Le Pen to defeat her." In response to these instructions, Emmanuel Macron said he did not believe "a republican front would form." While most political figures from both the right and the left call to block the far-right party, several, for different reasons, refuse the "republican front," both on the right (Nadine Morano, Henri Guaino, Éric Ciotti, Georges Fenech, Guillaume Larrivé, Christine Boutin, Jean-Frederic Poisson, Sens commun, La Manif pour tous, the CNIP) and on the radical left and far-left (Nathalie Arthaud, Philippe Poutou, Charlotte Girard, co-responsible for Jean-Luc Mélenchon's program, while he refuses to make a clear distinction between the two finalists, stating that one should not vote for the FN). Former Jacques Chirac minister Françoise Hostalier states that she will vote for Marine Le Pen, as will former Nicolas Sarkozy minister Christine Boutin, historical Gaullist Marie-France Garaud, president of the La Droite libre current Christian Vanneste, and president of the CNIP Bruno North.

Political scientist Olivier Rouquan notes that the weakening of the republican front observed in this election is due to "the normalization strategy implemented by Marine Le Pen," less mobilization around anti-racist associations, and the evolution of the sociological landscape: "The new generation of 18-30 year olds, reaching political maturity, has been less socialized into the fight against racism and the idea that the FN is a far-right party." He adds "the growing feeling of distrust, distance, or even rejection of the system and the traditional political class, which has increased with each election, at least since 2002." Jérôme Jaffré considers that "in 2002, the Chirac vote against Le Pen was a manifestation of the broadest possible republican defense against the far-right, which unexpectedly reached the second round. The 2017 vote, however, reflects the choice of the 'established,' those who, personally, feel sufficiently comfortable and, faced with Marine Le Pen's qualification in the second round, seek to avoid the economic and social choices she advocates."

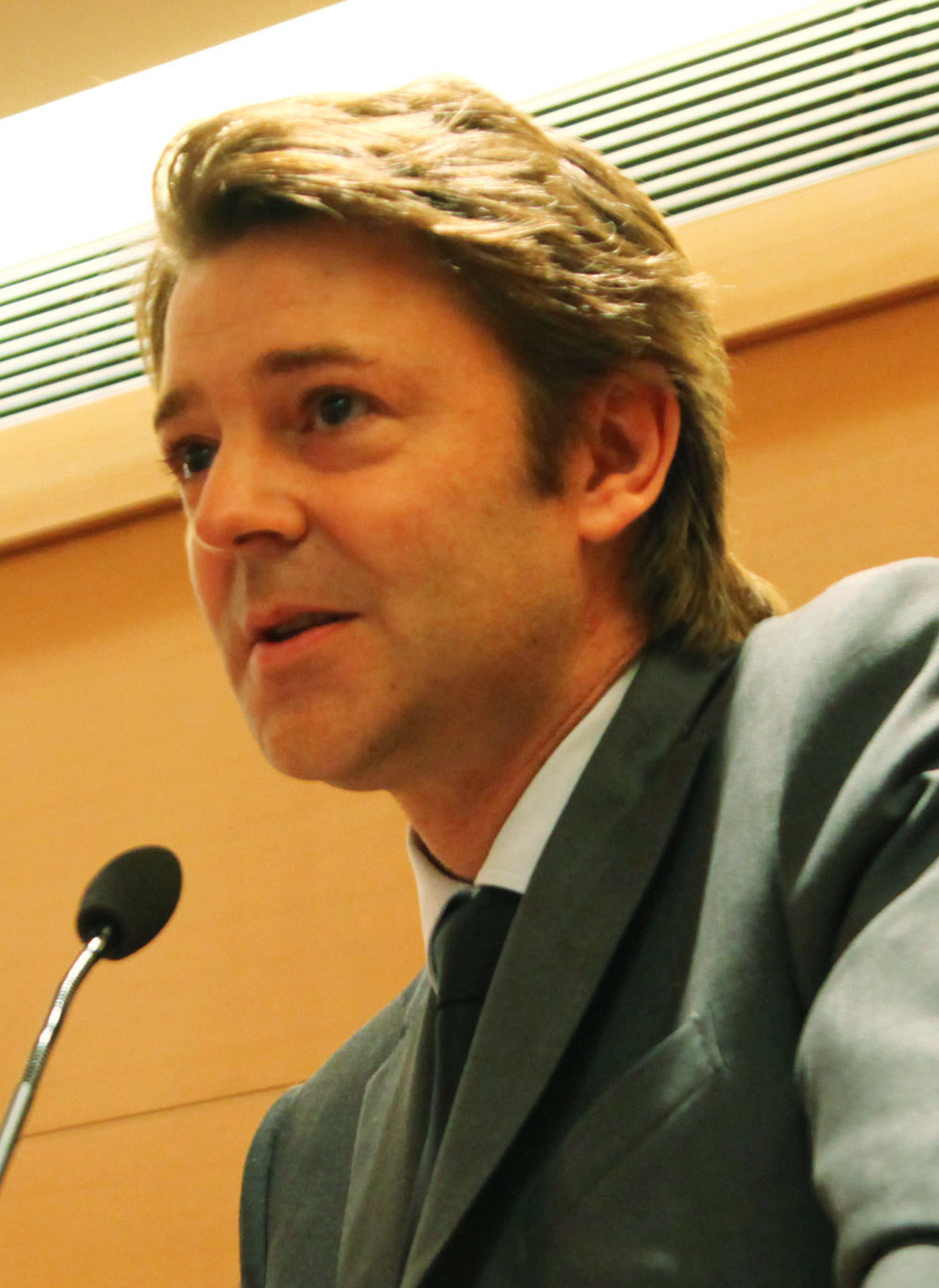
For the 2017 legislative elections, François Baroin broke with the “ni-ni” advice by calling for “reciprocal withdrawal” with LREM and the PS in the event of a triangular election with the FN.

In view of the 2017 legislative elections, François Baroin, leader of LR, advocates "mutual withdrawal" with La République en Marche (LREM) and Socialist Party candidates in constituencies where the FN could win, thus breaking with the "ni-ni" policy on the right until then. However, a number of party officials, including Laurent Wauquiez, distance themselves from this instruction. LREM accepts the principle of reciprocity. According to Le Huffington Post, François Baroin aims to "avoid giving the left wing of LR a pretext to break definitively," as it campaigns on the promise to vote confidence in the Édouard Philippe government. In the 18th constituency of Paris, Myriam El Khomri (PS) and Pierre-Yves Bournazel (LR), who both campaign within the "presidential majority" without facing an LREM candidate, commit to withdraw in favor of the best-placed candidate of the two in case of a triangular race with the La France Insoumise candidate, which some media interpret as a special case of republican front, though Myriam El Khomri rejects the term. After qualifying for the second round against Pierre-Yves Bournazel, she then calls for left-wing unity. Geographer Bernard Alidières notes "a very high level of abstention" in half of the constituencies where a far-right candidate is present in the second round, as well as a frequent rise in FN candidates' scores between the two rounds, "while the share of votes from the 'republican camp' (FI-PCF, PS-PRG, LREM-MoDem, LR-UDI) is in decline compared to the first round." He concludes that "a sort of disaffiliation from the 'republican front'" or, at the very least, that "invoking the sole 'FN peril' no longer seems enough to provoke a surge in participation."

In preparation for the 2020 municipal elections, LREM included the republican front among the commitments of its candidates. The party outlined three approaches to adopt when granting nominations and support for these elections: in "a few cities at risk of RN," field its head of the list when deemed strong enough to win (for example, Romain Grau in Perpignan, Lionel Depetri in Beaucaire, and Monica Michel in Arles); "support another political offer" when LREM "is not in a position to propose a candidate under its label capable of ensuring the broadest coalition" (for example, Dominique Baert (PS) in Wattrelos, Patrice Vergriete (various left) in Dunkirk, and Alexandre Cassaro (LR) in Forbach); and finally, "a republican withdrawal before the first round" (absence of a candidate), "without any precondition," to avoid the risk of vote splitting in cities where the risk is highest (for example, in Hayange and Denain). According to Le Monde, these last two strategies "resemble a rehabilitation of the republican front." With Louis Aliot and Romain Lopez, the RN won the mayoralties of Perpignan and Moissac against republican fronts, whereas its 2014 victories were achieved through triangular or quadrangular contests. While Marine Le Pen and Jordan Bardella celebrated the "death" or "end" of the republican front, it succeeded in defeating Cyril Nauth's re-election bid in Mantes-la-Ville. Alliances were observed between RN or far-right elected officials and right-wing officials, particularly during the election of presidencies or vice-presidencies of intercommunalities: in Morières-lès-Avignon, Grégoire Souque, supported by the RN, was elected with the votes of the right; Robert Ménard, mayor of Béziers, took the presidency of the Béziers Méditerranée urban community with the support of right-wing elected officials; David Rachline (RN) was elected first vice-president of the Var Estérel Méditerranée urban community thanks to votes from LR elected officials; an agreement between the right and the RN allowed the RN to retain control of the Grand Avignon.

Before the first round of the 2021 regional elections, several members of Emmanuel Macron's inner circle, including government spokesperson Gabriel Attal, supported the idea of a "technical merger" in the second round between lists opposing the RN, rather than withdrawing the less successful list. Between the two rounds of the 2021 regional elections in Provence-Alpes-Côte d'Azur, the left-wing union list led by Jean-Laurent Félizia withdrew to block the RN list led by Thierry Mariani, which had come first in the initial round. This decision aligned with the demands of the national bodies of Europe Écologie-Les Verts and the Socialist Party. In response, Renaud Muselier, leader of the LR list, committed to introducing "new mechanisms enabling [the left] to have influence through proposals for deliberations, motions, and resolutions within the regional assembly," similar to measures introduced by Christian Estrosi in 2015 when the Socialist list led by Christophe Castaner had already stepped aside.

An Ipsos/Sopra Steria poll conducted before the first round indicated that the desire for a republican front to defeat an RN-led list was supported by 70.4% of voters outside the RN electorate and by 54% of all voters, peaking at 81% among LREM voters. Additionally, 54% of respondents favored "technical mergers" between lists for the second round (merging without joining the executive body). Meanwhile, Christian Jacob, president of LR, and Damien Abad, leader of the LR group in the National Assembly, called for the withdrawal of presidential majority lists in the Pays de la Loire, Bourgogne-Franche-Comté, and Centre-Val de Loire regions to prevent victories by Green and La France Insoumise candidates allied with the Socialist Party in the second round. Damien Abad stated, "The republican front cannot be selective; extremism also exists on the left." In the second round of the regional and departmental elections, Le Parisien observed that "the number of blank votes increases when the National Rally is in the equation." The newspaper interpreted this as evidence that the "republican front is losing steam and that blank voting is increasingly becoming a form of protest." Despite polls predicting gains in several regions for the RN, the party won none and saw its support drop by more than 8 points compared to the previous regional election.

The 2022 presidential election saw far-right votes surpassing 30% in the first round, while Valérie Pécresse and Anne Hidalgo recorded the worst scores in their parties' histories. Emmanuel Macron was re-elected against Marine Le Pen, with a reduced margin of 58.5%, significantly lower than their previous contest. This indicated a further weakening of the republican front, as many left-wing voters refused to support Macron again merely to block Le Pen. Only Éric Zemmour and Nicolas Dupont-Aignan endorsed Marine Le Pen in the second round, while other candidates either called for abstention, voting for Macron, or at least not voting for Le Pen.

The subsequent legislative elections saw left-wing parties unite under the New Ecological and Social People's Union (NUPES), led by Jean-Luc Mélenchon’s La France Insoumise. Éric Zemmour’s proposed right-wing alliance of Les Républicains, the National Rally (RN), and Reconquête was rejected by the other parties. In the first round, NUPES and Macron’s coalition, Ensemble, achieved comparable results. Macron and his majority refused to issue voting instructions in contests between NUPES and RN candidates, effectively endorsing a "neither-nor" approach. Some Ensemble voters opted for abstention or even supported RN candidates, while many majority candidates refused to step aside in triangulated races favoring nationalists.

The National Rally (RN) ultimately secured 89 seats in the National Assembly, an unprecedented number under France’s two-round voting system for legislative elections, and far exceeding polling predictions. This outcome raised questions about Emmanuel Macron’s responsibility in facilitating RN’s historic entry into the Palais Bourbon. Macron’s approach broadened the scope of the republican front to include opposition on the left, even as many left-wing figures had previously called for voters to support him against Marine Le Pen. This refusal to call for a republican front against RN candidates drew particular criticism, as Macron’s outgoing majority had only weeks earlier appealed to Jean-Luc Mélenchon voters to defend "common values" during the presidential election’s run-off. The expansion of the republican front became evident when Macron expressed willingness to include opposition parties in Élisabeth Borne’s government, with the explicit exception of both the National Rally and La France Insoumise, which he argued were "not aligned as governing parties."

Following the RN's victory in the 2024 European elections, Emmanuel Macron dissolved the National Assembly. In response, François Ruffin led left-wing parties to form a broader coalition, the New Popular Front, surpassing the previous NUPES alliance.

During the first-round campaign, controversies arose over the positions of certain La France Insoumise deputies. This divided the outgoing majority’s strategy for second-round contests between New Popular Front and RN candidates. Proposals ranged from a total republican front (Clément Beaune), to conditional support based on the candidate’s affiliation or past remarks (e.g., Gérald Darmanin and Sabrina Agresti-Roubache), to outright rejection of the republican front (Olivia Grégoire). The controversial statements included remarks about the October 7 attacks and criticisms targeting Olivier Dussopt during the 2023 pension reform.

The National Rally (RN) emerged as the leading party in the first round. The left called for a Republican Front to prevent the RN from securing a majority in the new National Assembly and positioning itself to form the next government. Candidates from the New Popular Front (NFP) who finished third were urged to withdraw in cases where their presence risked enabling the election of an RN candidate, and in all circumstances for candidates of La France Insoumise (LFI).

Before the second round, Prime Minister Gabriel Attal called for the withdrawal of Ensemble candidates "whose continued presence in third position would result in the election of an RN deputy over another candidate who, like us, defends the values of the Republic." Édouard Philippe, representing the Horizons party within the presidential majority, advocated for blocking the RN and LFI, stating, "No vote should go to National Rally candidates, nor those of La France Insoumise."

The interim leadership of The Republicans (LR) declined to issue a directive to vote against the RN on July 7, declaring, "In constituencies where we are not present in the second round, we consider voters free to make their own choice and allow the French to express themselves as they see fit." Dominique de Villepin noted, "The Republican Front won the elections, and Les Républicains did not participate."

According to Marianne estimates, 18 The Republicans deputies won their seats thanks to the anti-RN Republican Front. The Republican Front preserved 68 seats for the presidential coalition, Ensemble, which benefited most from it. The New Popular Front gained 29 seats as a result. The underperformance of the RN in the 2024 legislative elections was attributed to both the Republican Front and the party's electoral limitations.

Following the appointment of an LR prime minister (representing the "Republican Right," which opposes alliances with the RN) from a party with a very small number of seats, the National Assembly is now divided into three blocs: (RN + allies), (LR + Ensemble), and the NFP. Initially, the coalition of two blocs (LR + Ensemble) could outvote the third bloc by passing motions of censure that could topple the government.

In an effort to differentiate this government from Michel Barnier's earlier attempt, parties that participated in the Republican Front—encouraged by socialists, ecologists, and communists but without the agreement of LFI—proposed a "non-censure" pact with the central bloc. This agreement aimed to prevent a government led by the right, center, or left from being penalized by a motion of censure initiated by the RN or any other parliamentary group until the next presidential election in 2027 or the dissolution of the National Assembly.

== Effectiveness against the National Rally ==
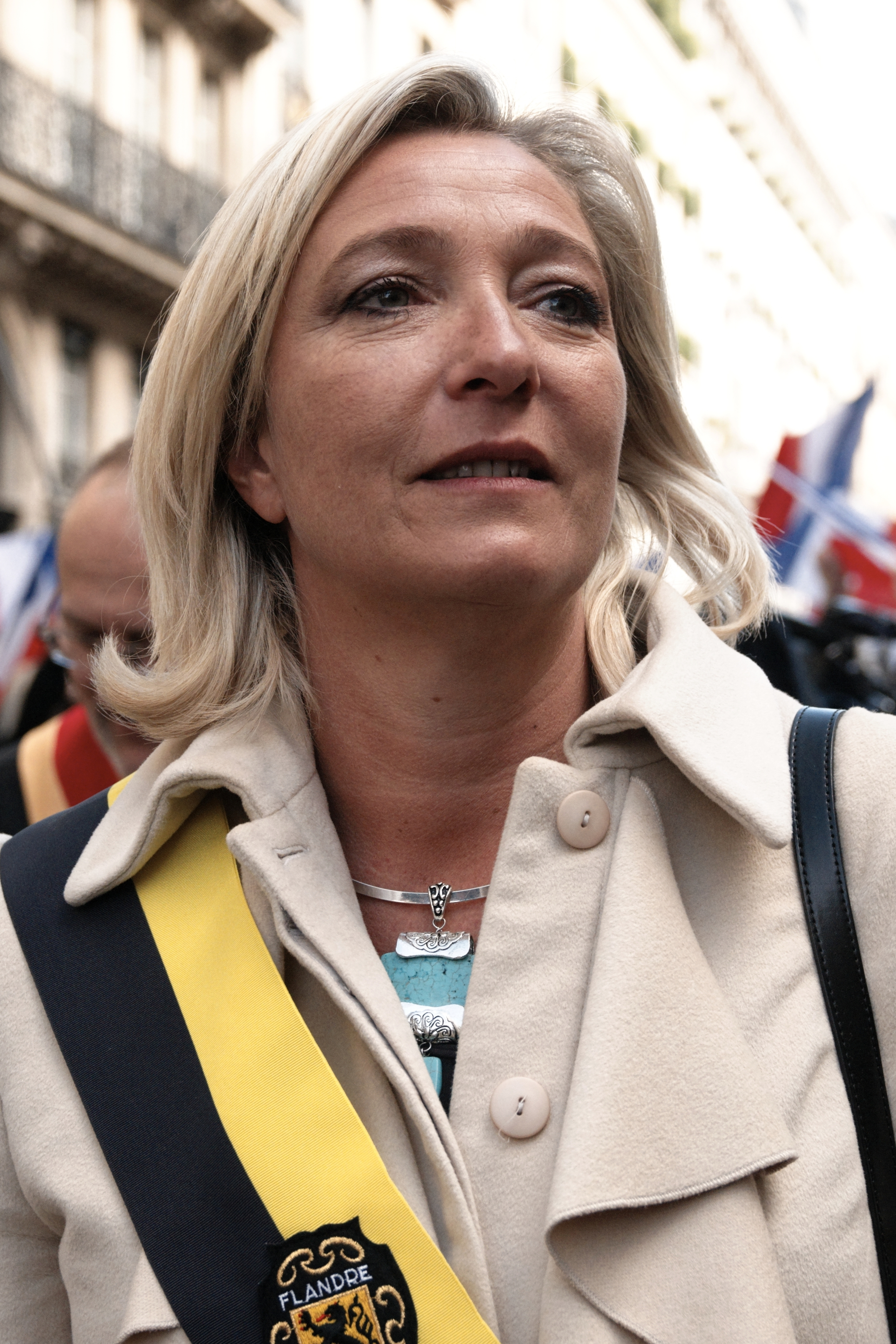
The effectiveness of the Republican Front has been put to the test in particular since Marine Le Pen became leader of the FN.

Historically, the call for a Republican Front has directly prevented far-right candidates from being elected, particularly in the 2000s. Political scientist Christophe Bouillaud and pollster Jérôme Fourquet noted in 2014 that the Republican Front remains a significant obstacle for the FN. Academic Thomas Ehrhard observed that "the absence of a Republican Front would be the most favorable scenario for the FN to achieve less sporadic victories. In this case, the tripolarization of the party system could materialize." However, Joël Gombin argued that "there is no clear evidence—nor refutation—of the electoral effectiveness of the Republican Front strategy. (...) In reality, voting instructions are rarely followed by voters, who largely distrust political figures and parties. Each situation is specific."

Some point out that the Republican Front is limited to an electoral strategy and fails to expand into a broader political project. Political scientist Jean-Yves Camus describes it as "a gigantic admission of incapacity to halt the progress of Le Penism." Xavier Landes, a researcher in political and economic philosophy, laments that the Republican Front is "often used as a wildcard to facilitate the election of moderate candidates 'by default,' that is, without them genuinely gaining popular support. This aspect reinforces the problematic, undemocratic nature of the Republican Front." Jérôme Grondeux emphasizes that the Republican Front "revives the old weaknesses of Republican defense, and even those of antifascism: being unable to lead to a comprehensive, coherent political project capable of rallying a large majority of citizens, at least for a few years. [...] It appears as a cruel and risky game whose only tangible outcome is to exclude a developing political force from the political arena. A gigantic pressure cooker, in sum."

The indirect effects of the Republican Front are seen by some observers as counterproductive: exclusion from power, even at the local level, often becomes an electoral argument for the Front National (FN), reinforcing its legitimacy as the "unique alternative to the ruling class." This exclusion bolsters its portrayal of the political spectrum as divided "between a national-populist bloc and a liberal-socialist bloc," or, as Marine Le Pen phrases it, "between globalists and patriots." The Republican Front is sometimes accused of validating the FN's slogan "UMPS" (a portmanteau denouncing the perceived collusion of mainstream right- and left-wing parties), which undermines distinctions between governmental right and left ideologies. This critique is exacerbated when the UMP (Union for a Popular Movement) shifts to the right. Historian Nicolas Lebourg notes that in the 2014 municipal elections, Perpignan was the only city where the Socialist Party (PS) withdrew in favor of the LR (Les Républicains) to block an FN victory. However, by the first round of the 2015 regional elections, the FN had surpassed the combined votes of PS and LR. "A tactic does not make a strategy," he adds. Furthermore, the Republican Front may over-mobilize potential FN voters by fostering a perception of arrogance or disdain. Political scientist Olivier Rouquan argues that the strategy has allowed the FN to "retain its most motivated and mobilized base of activists, adopt a scapegoat posture, and fuel conspiracy thinking—a significant element of far-right ideology—thereby gradually increasing its electorate." During the 2014 municipal elections, FN-backed leaders claimed they no longer feared the Republican Front and even benefited from its calls. For instance, Robert Ménard remarked, "Each time they emphasized it, we climbed in the polls." However, the FN's denunciation of the Republican Front sometimes reveals contradictions: while striving to break free from symbolic exclusion in its "dedemonization" efforts, it simultaneously underscores the alleged convergence of UMP and PS values.

In practice, the presence of the Front National (FN) in the second round does not seem to drive abstentionist voters to mobilize at the polls. During the legislative elections of 2002, 2007, and 2012, voter turnout slightly decreased between the two rounds in PS-FN duels, mirroring trends across the rest of France. Moreover, in such situations, the left’s progress against the FN has diminished over time. According to Joël Gombin, "Far from a watertight boundary between Republican Front voters and FN voters, we see instead a relative but significant merging of right-wing and far-right electorates."

Additionally, the normalization of the FN within the political landscape during the 2010s has reduced the Republican Front’s effectiveness. For example, during the 2012 presidential campaign, Nicolas Sarkozy stated that Marine Le Pen, then FN candidate and party president since 2011, "is compatible with the Republic." Le Pen herself has embraced the term "Republican Front" during the 2011 cantonal elections and the 2015 regional elections. Jérôme Sainte-Marie, a political scientist and pollster, notes that "it is increasingly difficult to label the FN as far-right, which renders the concept of the 'Republican Front' obsolete." Jérôme Grondeux observes that Marine Le Pen, born in 1968, has not experienced any of the major historical milestones of the French far right, making her harder to target with traditional antifascist narratives, which often rely on historical references. He adds that the FN emerged as the main party within the majority "no" camp during the 2005 referendum on the European Constitutional Treaty, which gave it "additional democratic legitimacy." After the 2017 presidential election, political scientist Grégoire Kauffmann highlighted "the inconsistency of the Republican Front," noting that the FN candidate managed to appropriate "the words and symbols of the Republic to her advantage."

Nicolas Lebourg, meanwhile, advocates for rethinking the so-called "cordon sanitaire" intended to isolate the right from the far right. He argues, "It has deteriorated: currently, the FN cannot access power, but other parties adopt its ideas. This seems unhealthy, as it creates frustration while radicalizing the entire political landscape. The 'cordon' should concern ideas, not individuals. Let the FN win seats if it does so fairly, but other parties should not absorb its ideological framework."

== See also ==
- Cordon sanitaire (politics)
- Dédiabolisation
- Firewall against the far-right in Germany

== Bibliography ==
- Villalba, Bruno (1998). "L'esquive. La gauche et la droite face au Front national" [The dodge. Left and right against the Front National]. L'Extrême droite en France et en Belgique [The far right in France and Belgium] (PDF) (in French). Éditions Complexe. pp. 215–216. ISBN 9782870277348. Archived from the original (PDF) on August 3, 2016.
- Perrineau, Pascal (2014). La France au Front : Essai sur l'avenir du FN [La France au Front: Essay on the future of the FN]. Documents (in French). Paris: Fayard. ISBN 978-2-213-68103-0. Archived from the original on January 2, 2022.
- Gombin, Joël (2015). "Mythologie du front républicain" [Mythology of the Republican front]. Le Monde diplomatique (in French). p. 7. Archived from the original on December 9, 2024.
- Brustier, Gaël; Escalona, Fabien (2015). "La gauche et la droite face au Front national : sociologie d'un parti politique" [The left and the right in the face of the Front National: sociology of a political party]. Les Faux-semblants du Front national [The false pretenses of the Front National] (in French). Presses de Sciences Po. ISBN 978-2-7246-1810-5. Archived from the original on April 11, 2023.
- Ecuvillon, Pierre (2015). Le Phénomène Le Pen : analyse relationnelle, historique et esthétique d'une singularité politique (PhD thesis in sociology thesis) (in French). Paul Valéry University Montpellier 3. Archived from the original on September 12, 2024.
