= Nicolas Lebourg =

French historian (born 1974)

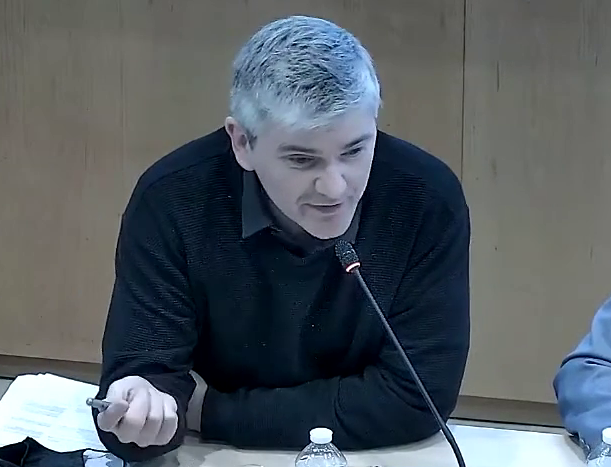
Nicolas Lebourg in 2022.

Nicolas Lebourg (born 1974) is a French historian who specializes on far-right movements in Europe.

== Biography ==
Born in 1974, Lebourg studied sociology at Aix-Marseille University and history at the University of Perpignan, from which he graduated with a PhD in contemporary history in 2005, after a thesis on French national revolutionaries during the period 1940–2002.

Between 2015 and 2017, he was a research fellow in the program "History of fascism in Europe and Eurasia" at George Washington University, under the supervision of French historian Marlène Laruelle. In 2017–2018, he was a project researcher in the study group "The Far Right in Europe and Russia’s Role and Influence" for the Carnegie Council for Ethics in International Affairs.

Lebourg also comments on the current political events in various newspapers such as Slate, Mediapart and Libération.

== Works ==
- Le Monde vu de la plus extrême droite. Du fascisme au nationalisme-révolutionnaire, Presses universitaires de Perpignan, 2010.
- François Duprat, L’homme qui inventa le Front national (with Joseph Beauregard), Denoël, 2012.
- Dans l’Ombre des Le Pen. Une histoire des n°2 du Front National (with Joseph Beauregard), Nouveau Monde, 2012.
- Mort aux bolchos Un siècle d’affiches anticommunistes, Les Échappés, 2012.
- Perpignan, une ville avant le Front national (with Jérôme Fourquet and Sylvain Manternach), Fondation Jean Jaurès, 2014.
- Aux Racines du FN. L’Histoire du mouvement Ordre Nouveau (preface by Jean-Yves Camus, with Jonathan Preda and Joseph Beauregard), Fondation Jean Jaurès, 2014.
- Rivesaltes, Le Camp de la France de 1939 à nos jours (preface by Philippe Joutard, with Abderahmen Moumen), Trabucaire, 2015.
- Mutations et diffusions de l’altérophobie. De « l’inégalité des races » aux concurrences identitaires (with Stéphane François), Presses universitaires de Valenciennes, 2016.
- Lettre aux Français qui croient que 5 ans d'extrême droite remettraient la France debout, Les Échappés, 2016. ISBN 978-2357661240
- La Nouvelle Guerre d’Algérie n’aura pas lieu (with Jérôme Fourquet), Fondation Jean Jaurès, 2017.
- Les Droites extrêmes en Europe (with Jean-Yves Camus), Paris, Le Seuil, 2015 (English translation : Far-Right Politics in Europe, Cambridge, Harvard University Press, 2017).
- La Violence des marges politiques des années 1980 à nos jours (with Isabelle Sommier), Reveneuve, 2018.
- Les nazis ont-ils survécu ? Enquête sur les internationales fascistes et les croisés de la race blanche, Le Seuil, 2019. ISBN 978-2021413717
- Deschamps, Daphné; Garnier, Christophe-Cecil; Lebourg, Nicolas; Mollard, Mathieu; Johan, Weisz (29 May 2026). Extrême danger : connaître et contrer l'extrême droite radicale. Rennes: Éditions du commun. p. 320. ISBN 979-10-95630-98-2.
