= Hôtel de Ville, Hénin-Beaumont =

Town hall in Hénin-Beaumont, France

Hôtel de Ville
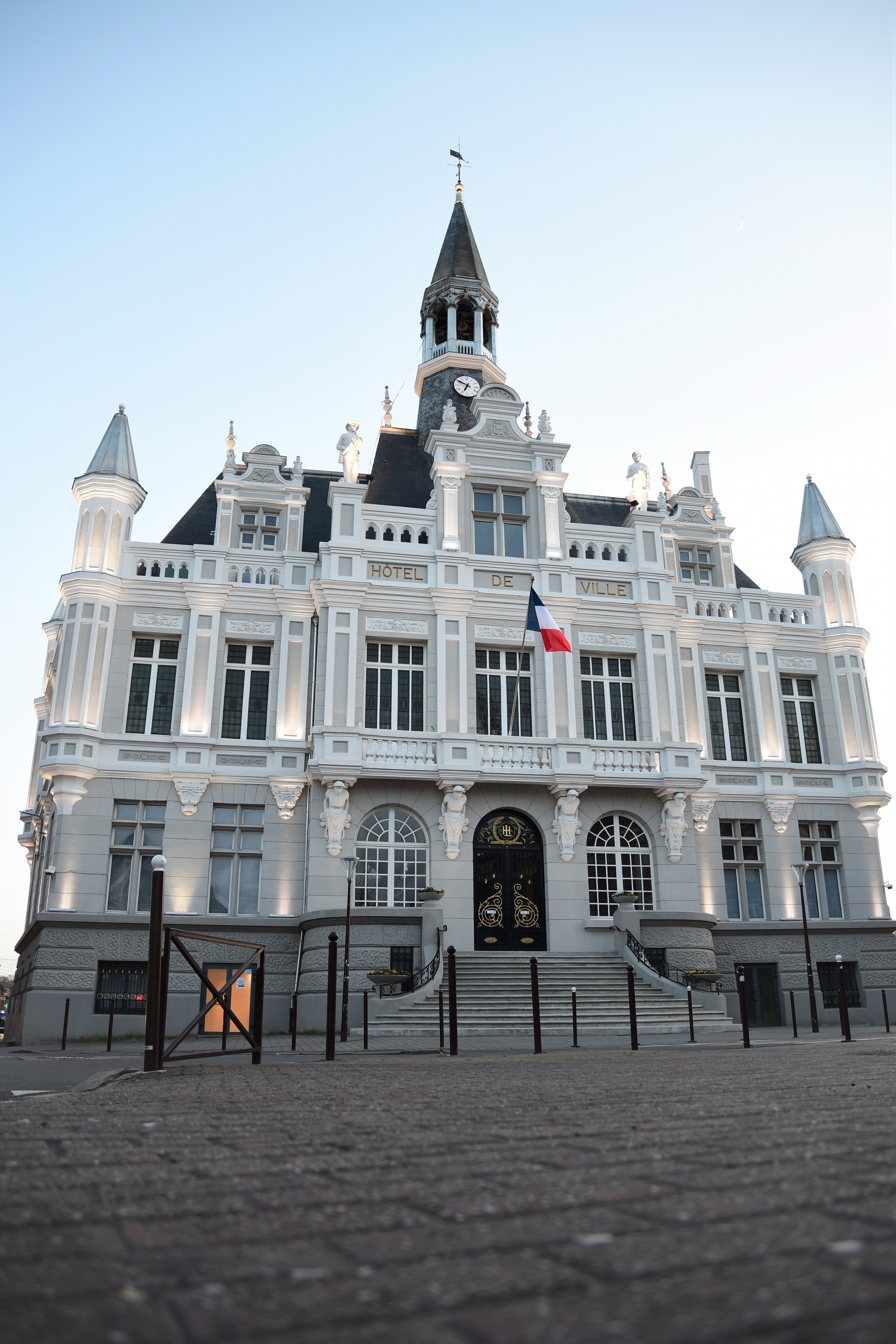
- The main frontage of the Hôtel de Ville in March 2019
- Interactive map of the Hôtel de Ville area

General information
- Type: City hall
- Architectural style: Châteauesque style
- Location: Hénin-Beaumont, France
- Coordinates: 50.4190°N 2.9467°E
- Completed: 1925

Design and construction
- Architect: André Dufau

The Hôtel de Ville (French pronunciation: [otɛl də vil], City Hall) is a municipal building in Hénin-Beaumont, Pas-de-Calais, in northern France, standing on Place Jean Jaurès.

== History ==
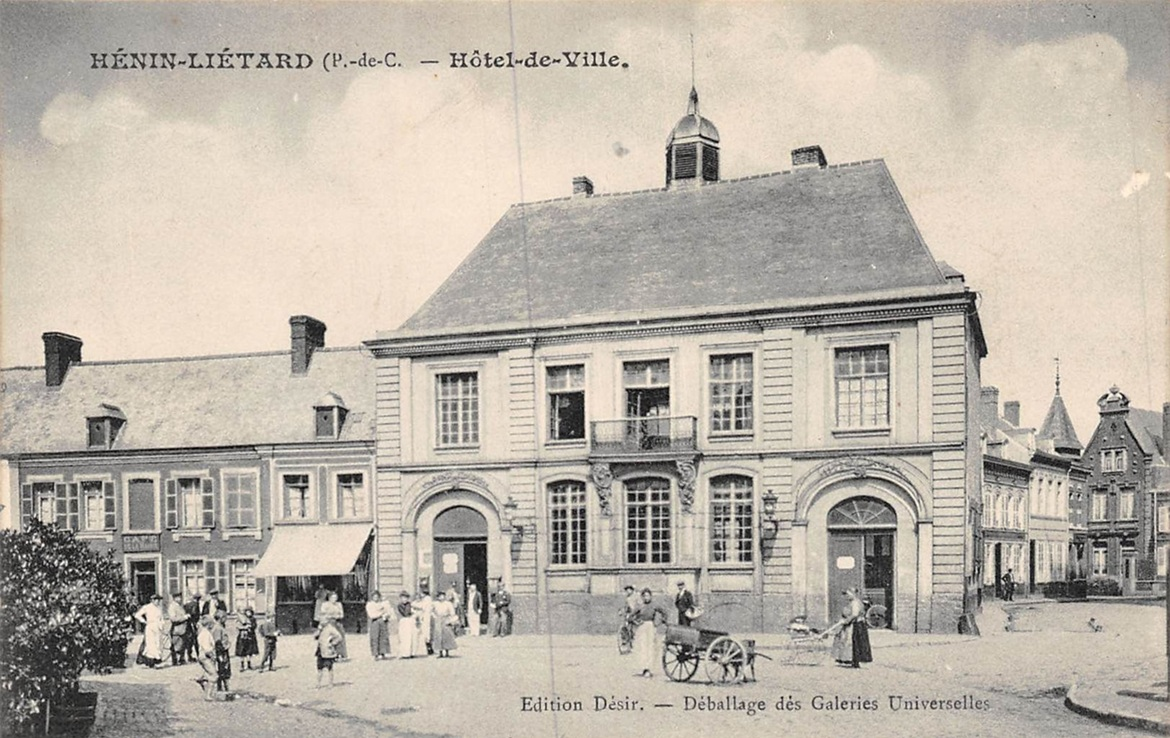
The old town hall

The first town hall was on the corner of Place Jean Jaurès and Rue de l'Église. It was designed in the neoclassical style, built in ashlar stone and was completed in 1775. The design involved a symmetrical main frontage of five bays facing onto the street. The outer bays contained round headed openings formed by pilasters supporting imposts and moulded surrounds on the ground floor, while the central bay featured a French door with a balcony on the first floor. The rest of the building was fenestrated by segmental headed windows on the ground floor and by square headed windows on the first floor. At roof level, there was a small octagonal belfry with louvres and a dome.

Following the First Battle of Arras in October 1914, during the First World War, German troops occupied the town and ransacked the town hall. Then, during the Second Battle of Arras in April 1917, the town hall was reduced to a shell by allied bombardment directed at the German occupants.

After the war the council decided to commission a new town hall on a different site. The site they selected, on the corner of Rue Henri Leclercq and Place Jean Jaurès, was occupied by a local agricultural business known as Caullet Farm. Construction of new building started in late 1923. The mayor, Adolphe Charlon, sealed a commemorative parchment in a bottle and placed it in the wall of the building in February 1924. The building was designed by the municipal architect, André Dufau, in the Châteauesque style, built in ashlar stone and was completed in November 1925. It was officially opened by the prefect of Pas-de-Calais, Paul Peytral, on 13 June 1926.

The design involved a symmetrical main frontage of seven bays facing onto the street. The central section of three bays, which was slightly projected forward, featured a flight of steps leading up to a round-headed opening flanked by a pair of round-headed windows. There were three French doors with balustraded balconies on the first floor and a single dormer window at roof level. The dormer window was flanked by statues, depicting a miner and a metal worker, created by the sculptor, Henri Rogerol. Behind the dormer window, there was a steep roof surmounted by an octagonal belfry with a spire. The outer bays were fenestrated in a similar style. All the bays were flanked by pilasters and there were bartizans at the corners of the building. Internally, the principal room was the Salle du Conseil (council chamber), which featured fine stained glass windows.

The building became the town hall of the enlarged council after the commune of Hénin-Liétard merged with the commune of Beaument to form the commune of Hénin-Beaumont in 1970.
