= 2009 Hénin-Beaumont mayoral by-election =

Special election in Hénin-Beaumont

← 2008	28 June and 5 July	2014 →
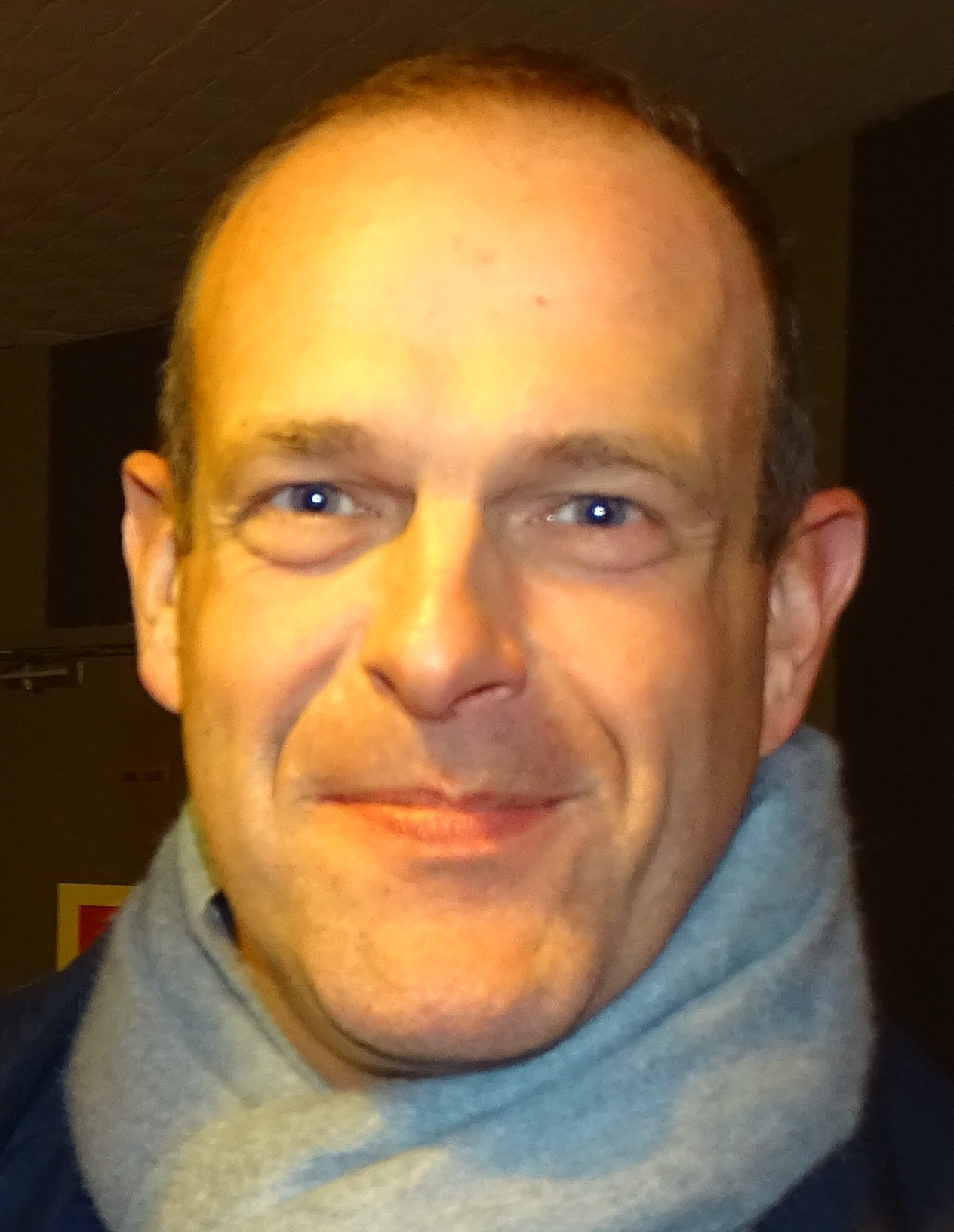
Candidate	Daniel Duquenne	Steeve Briois
Party	DVG	FN
Popular vote	6,054	5,504
Percentage	52.3%	47.6%
Mayor before election
Gérard Dalongeville
PS
Elected mayor
Daniel Duquenne
DVG

There was a by-election in France for the municipality of Hénin-Beaumont held on 8 July. It was triggered after the mayor, Gérard Dalongeville, was convicted for embezzlement of public funds, corruption, forgery in private writing, favoritism and conceal of favoritism. The election was notable due to the fact that Steeve Briois, a Front National councillor for the town made it to the second round where he was eventually beaten by a coalition against FN. Steeve Briois was eventually elected mayor in 2014.

== Background ==
In the 2008 municipal elections, Parti Socialiste candidate, Gérard Dalongeville got 44.30% in the first round followed by Steeve Briois with 28.48% Daniel Duquenne got 19.23% in 2008.

Only a year later on 7 March 2009, Gérard Dalongeville was placed in custody in Lille under claims that he had committed embezzlement and as the case developed, he was suspended from PS on 21 April and then on 27 April was suspended as mayor.

== First round ==
In the first round, there were 9 candidates standing for Mayor with Steeve Briois and Daniel Duquenne appearing as the front runners after a poll from La Voix du Nord shown that Steeve Briois had 35% of the vote, an increase of 7% from 2008 and Daniel Duquenne close behind

On the night of 28 June, the Front National came in 39% of the vote, an 11% increase from 2008 and 800 more votes. This was followed by Daniel Duquenne and Pierre Ferrari, who obtained 20.19% and 17.01% respectively. After the FN got into the second round, numerous mainstream politicians called for citizens of Hénin-Beaumont to vote against Steeve Briois. This included Hervé Morin, Xavier Bertrand, Valérie Pécresse and Jean-François Copé. In reaction to the UMP endorsement of Duquenne, Briois said "It's like the cherry on top".

French actor, Dany Boon called for people to vote against FN saying that "the National Front conveys ideas to the opposite of the Nord-Pas de Calais" To this statement, Marine Le Pen replied saying that he was a good actor but he didn't understand the situation of the people in Hénin-Beaumont.

== Second round ==
As the second round started, candidate for the PS and Modem offered Pierre Ferrari to ally with Daniel Duquenne, Duquenne refused and after realizing the endorsements were in Duquenne's favor, he dropped out of the race.

On 5 July 2009, Daniel Duquenne won the election with 6,054 votes or 52.38% where Steeve Briois who obtained 5,504 votes or 47.62% came second. Following this defeat, Marine Le Pen said "there are defeats that are extremely honorable and this one of them."

== Results ==
Candidate	Party	First Round		Second Round		Seats	
Candidate	Party	Votes	%	Votes	%	Number	%
Steeve Briois	FN	4,485	39.33	5,504	47.62	8	22,86
Daniel Duquenne	DVG	2,303	20.20	6,054	52.38	27	77,14
Pierre Ferrari	PS-MoDem	1,940	17,01				
Régine Calzia	Les Verts	971	8,52				
Pierre Darchicourt	DVG	603	5,29				
Nesrédine Ramdani	UMP	495	4,34				
Séverine Duval	NPA	276	2,42				
Laurent Bocquet	DVD	237	2,08				
Jean-Marie Monka	DVG	93	0,82				
Registered Voters		19,333	100,0	19,333	100,0		
Abstentions		7,704	39,80	7 274	37,62		
Votes		11,629	60,20	12,059	62,38		
Blank Votes		226	1,20	501	2,60		
Turnout		11,403	59,00	11,558	59,78		
