= Jean-François Jalkh =

French politician (born 1957)

Jean-François Jalkh MEP
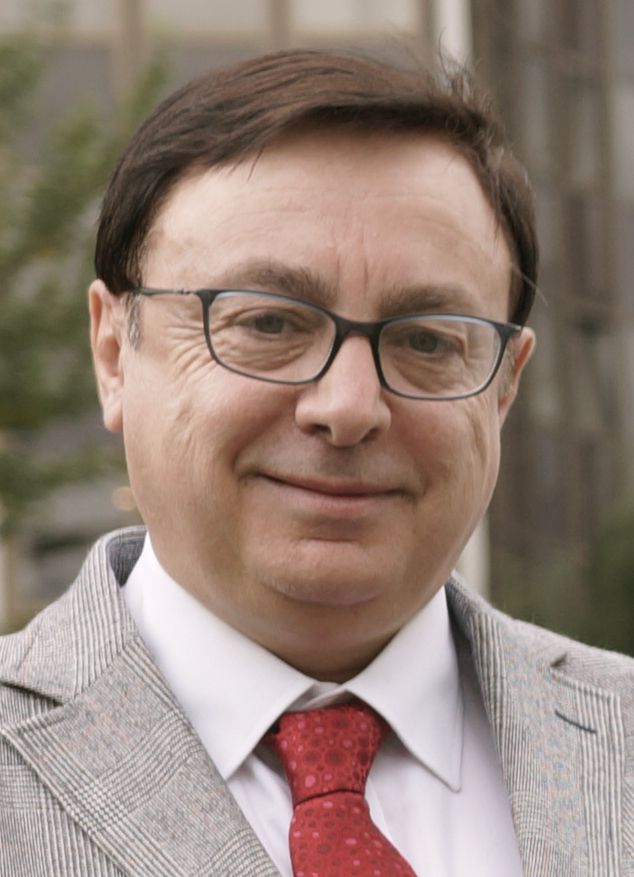
- Jalkh in 2015

Leader of the National Front (Interim)
- In office 25 April 2017 – 28 April 2017
- Preceded by: Marine Le Pen
- Succeeded by: Steeve Briois (interim)

Member of the European Parliament for East France
- Incumbent
- Assumed office 1 July 2014

Personal details
- Born: 23 May 1957 (age 68) Tournan-en-Brie, France
- Party: National Front

Jean-François Jalkh (French pronunciation: [ʒɑ̃fʁɑ̃swa ʒalk]; born 23 May 1957) is a French politician who is the current Member of the European Parliament for the National Rally, representing East France from 2014 to 2019 and France from 2019 to 2024.

On 25 April 2017, after the resignation of Marine Le Pen as leader of the National Front, Jalkh was named as the interim leader. He stepped down three days later, on 28 April, after being heavily criticised on comments made about Nazi extermination camps (see below). He was replaced by Steeve Briois as Interim Leader.

He is known for his "vieille garde" (old guard) views, relating to the pre-de-demonisation platform of the FN, such as calling the use of Zyklon B in the Holocaust "technically impossible" and opposing the expulsion of Jean-Marie Le Pen from the Front National.

== Works ==
- With Jean-Yves Le Gallou (1987). Être Français cela se mérite. Albatros. BnF 366263467.
