= Hénin-Beaumont =

- Commune
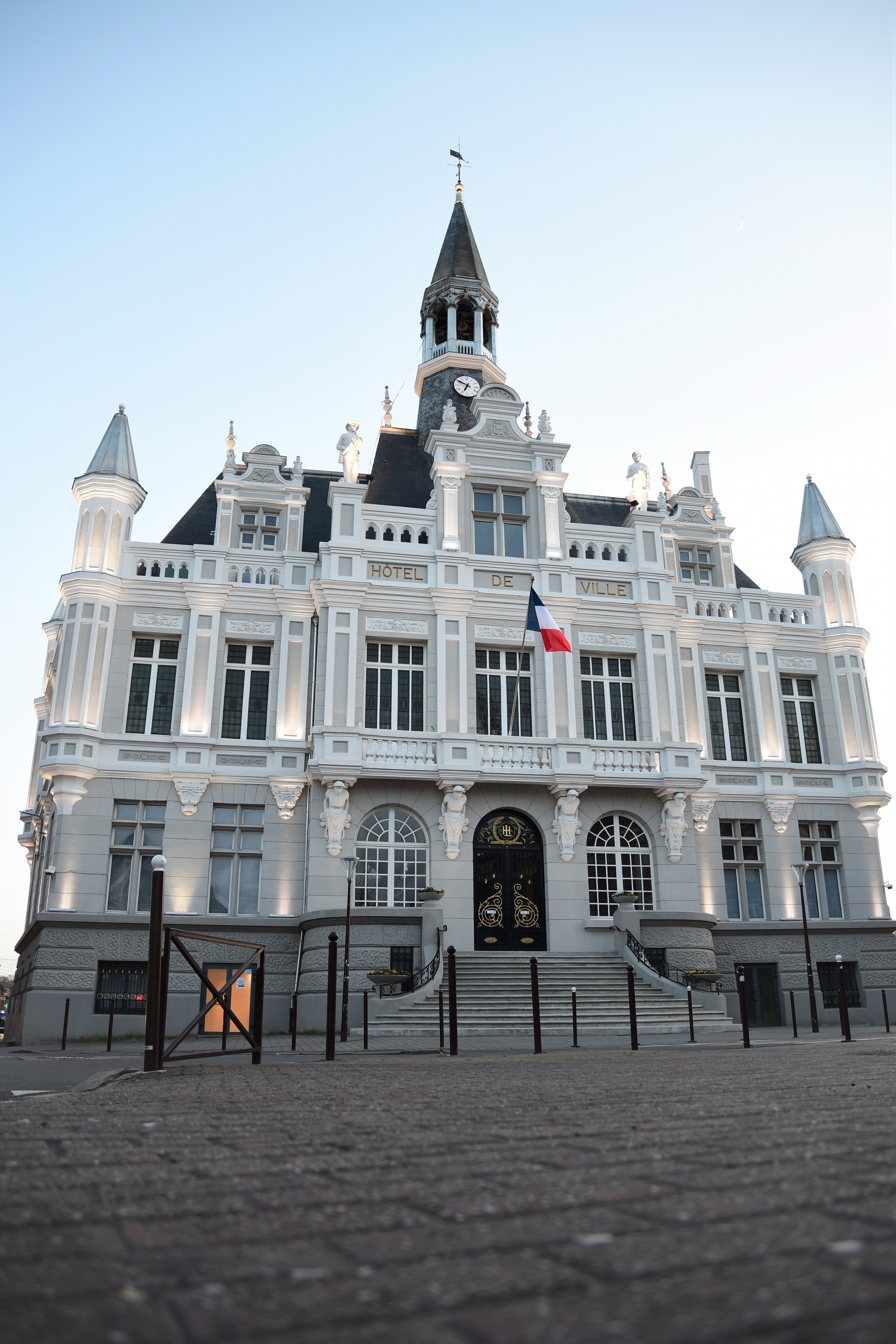
- The Hôtel de Ville

- Coat of arms
- Location of Hénin-Beaumont
- Location within France Location within Hauts-de-France
- Coordinates: 50°25′18″N 2°57′03″E
- Country: France
- Region: Hauts-de-France
- Department: Pas-de-Calais
- Arrondissement: Lens
- Canton: Hénin-Beaumont-1 and 2
- Intercommunality: CA Hénin-Carvin

Government
  - Mayor (2020–2026): Steeve Briois (RN)
- Area^{1}: 20.72 km^{2} (8.00 sq mi)
- Elevation: 32 m (105 ft)
- Highest elevation: 65 m (213 ft)
- Lowest elevation: 23 m (75 ft)
- Population (2023): 25,688
  - Density: 1,240/km^{2} (3,211/sq mi)
- Time zone: UTC+01:00 (CET)
  - Summer (DST): UTC+02:00 (CEST)
- INSEE/Postal code: 62427 /62110
- ^{1} French Land Register data, which excludes lakes, ponds, glaciers > 1 km^{2} (0.386 sq mi or 247 acres) and river estuaries.

Hénin-Beaumont (French pronunciation: [enɛ̃ bomɔ̃]; Picard: Hinnin-Biaumont) is a commune in the Pas-de-Calais department in the Hauts-de-France region of France about 6.7 kilometres (4.2 mi) east of Lens.

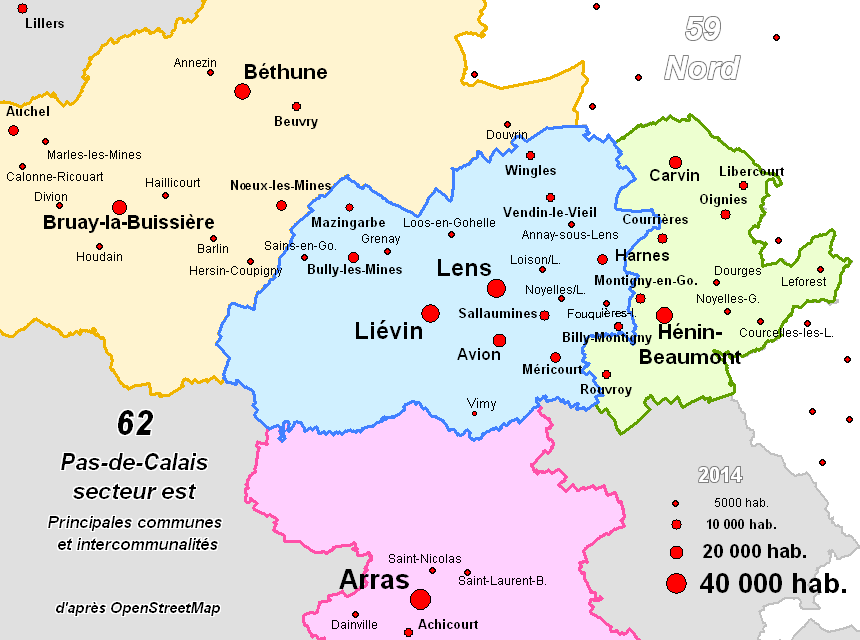
East Pas-de-Calais (Béthune, Lens, Hénin-Beaumont)

== History ==
The commune came into existence in 1970, the result of a merger of the communes of Hénin-Liétard and Beaumont.

During World War I on the night of 3–4 October 1914, the Germans blew up the church of Saint-Martin, which was rebuilt in Greco-Byzantine style in 1932.

The Hôtel de Ville was completed in 1925.

In the Second World War Hénin-Beaumont was liberated by the Allies, in September 1944.

== Politics ==
In the 2009 election to replace the incumbent Socialist mayor who had resigned after a corruption scandal, the National Front took first place in the first round with 39% of the vote. A left-wing list was second with 20% of the vote. This led all other parties including the center-right Union for a Popular Movement to support the list led by the independent left-wing candidate, Daniel Duquenne in the second round runoff. Duquenne won the race 52%-48%.

In the first round of the 2012 presidential election, Marine Le Pen won in Hénin-Beaumont, with 35% of the vote, ahead of François Hollande (27%) and Nicolas Sarkozy (16%).

In 2014, the far right Front National won control of the city outright. FN politician Steeve Briois was elected mayor with 50.3 percent of the vote.

The town has been noted for its political control swinging from socialist to far-right.

== Population ==
Historical population

Year	Pop.	±% p.a.
1793	998	—
1800	2,248	+12.30%
1806	2,462	+1.53%
1821	2,807	+0.88%
1831	3,006	+0.69%
1836	2,839	−1.14%
1841	2,993	+1.06%
1846	3,091	+0.65%
1851	3,142	+0.33%
1856	3,280	+0.86%
1861	3,850	+3.26%
1866	4,561	+3.45%
1872	5,029	+1.64%
1876	5,491	+2.22%
1881	6,546	+3.58%
1886	7,848	+3.69%
1891	9,467	+3.82%
1896	11,984	+4.83%
1901	14,327	+3.64%

Year	Pop.	±% p.a.
1906	16,016	+2.25%
1911	17,827	+2.17%
1921	14,035	−2.36%
1926	21,454	+8.86%
1931	22,631	+1.07%
1936	21,946	−0.61%
1946	22,552	+0.27%
1954	23,673	+0.61%
1962	25,527	+0.95%
1968	25,067	−0.30%
1975	26,405	+0.75%
1982	26,037	−0.20%
1990	26,257	+0.11%
1999	25,178	−0.47%
2007	26,031	+0.42%
2012	26,482	+0.34%
2017	26,022	−0.35%
2023	25,688	−0.22%

Source: EHESS and INSEE (1968-2023)

== Twin cities ==
Hénin-Beaumont is twinned with:

- Konin, Poland
- Herne, Germany
- Wakefield, England, United Kingdom
- Rufisque, Senegal
- Rolling Meadows, United States

== See also ==
- Communes of the Pas-de-Calais department
