= Steeve Briois =

French politician (born 1972)

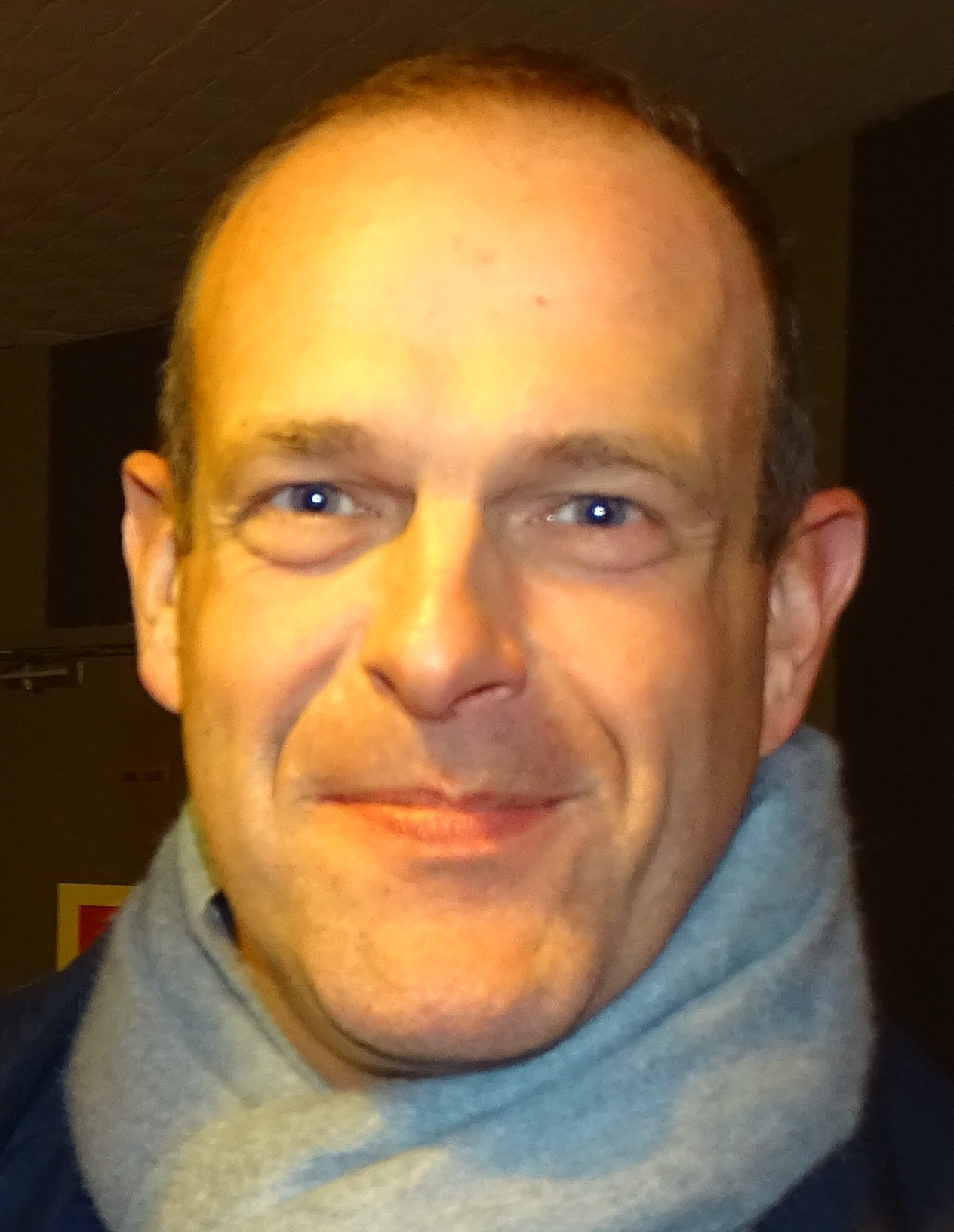
- Briois in 2015

Leader of the National Front (Interim)
- In office 28 April 2017 – 15 May 2017
- Preceded by: Jean-François Jalkh (interim)
- Succeeded by: Marine Le Pen

Mayor of Hénin-Beaumont
- Incumbent
- Assumed office 30 March 2014
- Preceded by: Eugène Binaisse

Member of the European Parliament
- In office 1 July 2014 – 1 July 2019
- Constituency: North-West France

Member of the Hénin-Beaumont City Council
- Incumbent
- Assumed office 18 June 1995

Personal details
- Born: 28 November 1972 (age 53) Seclin, France
- Party: FN/RN (1988–1998; 2001–present)
- Other political affiliations: MNR (1998–2001)
- Spouse: Bruno Bilde
- Relatives: Dominique Bilde (mother-in-law)

Steeve Briois (French pronunciation: [stiv bʁiwa]; born 28 November 1972) is a French politician. In 2017, he was interim leader of the National Front. In 2014, he was elected mayor of Hénin-Beaumont and a member of the European Parliament. From 2011 to 2014, he was general-secretary of the National Front. He was a member of the regional council of Nord-Pas-de-Calais from 1998 to 2014.

He was the interim leader of the National Front from 28 April 2017, after the previous interim leader, Jean-François Jalkh, stepped down.

== Early life ==
Briois was born in Seclin, Nord, where his father was a worker and his mother a bookkeeper. His parents later divorced. Fascinated by Jean-Marie Le Pen, he became a member of the National Front at the age of 16. After finishing a Brevet de Technicien Supérieur, Briois worked for a period as a salesman for Numericable.

== Political career ==
Steeve Briois holding a speech in 2014 with Marine Le Pen in attendance

In 1995, Briois became a member of the municipal council in Hénin-Beaumont and, in 1998, a member of the regional council of Nord-Pas-de-Calais. When Bruno Mégret broke from the National Front in 1998, Briois followed him, but returned in 2000.

In the 2008 French municipal elections, Briois ran for mayor in Hénin-Beaumont on a list which had Marine Le Pen in second spot. Receiving 28.83% of the votes, the bid failed in its first round, with the list getting 5 of the 35 seats in the municipal council.

The elected mayor, Gérard Dalongeville, resigned from his post in 2009 following allegations of economic irregularities, resulting in a by-election. The list of Briois obtained 39.34% of the votes in the first round of that election, but lost in the second round with 47.62% of the votes to a miscellaneous left list which obtained 52.38%.

Briois was elected a member of the central committee of the National Front in 2007. After Marine Le Pen became president of the party in 2011, he was named general secretary of the party.

In the 2014 French municipal elections, Briois was elected mayor of Hénin-Beaumont in the first round in March with 50.26% of the votes. He was elected a member of the European Parliament for North-West France in the European Parliament elections in May the same year. Briois was placed second on a list led by Marine Le Pen, which obtained five seats.

At the National Front Congress in Lyon in November 2014, Briois was elected one of the vice-presidents of the party, responsible for local executives and supervision, and was succeeded by Nicolas Bay as general-secretary.

== 2013 book and privacy case ==
In the book Le Front National des villes et le Front National des champs, published in 2013, the author Octave Nitkowski wrote that Briois was gay. Briois, who neither denied nor confirmed the information, demanded along with another politician that the book be stopped for violation of privacy. A local court ruled that the book be stopped for this reason, but the Court of Appeal of Paris overturned the decision with regard to Briois, stating that for leading politicians, the public's right for information carried more weight than the politician's right to privacy.

Briois has subsequently revealed himself to be in a relationship with fellow National Rally politician Bruno Bilde.

== Awards ==
In January 2015, Briois received the Le Trombinoscope prize for local politicians of the year. The prize winner is selected by French journalists, and Briois was selected as a symbol of the National Front's success in the 2014 elections. It was the first Trombinoscope prize awarded to a politician for the National Front. The award ceremony was held in the office of the President of the National Assembly, but President Claude Bartolone did not attend in protest at the prize being awarded to Briois. The French prime minister, Manuel Valls, the Minister of Ecology, Ségolène Royal, and the Minister of Economy, Emmanuel Macron, who had also won awards, did not attend either, but sent representatives to the ceremony.

== Electoral performance ==
Briois has contested numerous elections under the FN banner:

Municipal elections

| Date of election | Constituency | Party | Votes | % of votes | Result |
|---|---|---|---|---|---|
| Municipal elections, 1995 | Hénin-Beaumont | FN | n/a | n/a | Elected |
| Municipal elections, 2001 | Hénin-Beaumont | FN | n/a | n/a | Re-elected |
| Municipal elections, 2008 | Hénin-Beaumont | FN | n/a | 28.83 | Re-elected (as councillor, lost mayoral election) |
| 2009 municipal election in Hénin-Beaumont | Hénin-Beaumont | FN | 5,504 | 47.64 | Re-elected (as councillor, lost mayoral election) |
| Municipal elections, 2014 | Hénin-Beaumont | FN | 6,006 | 50,25 | Elected (as mayor) |

Regional elections

| Date of election | Constituency | Party | Votes | % of votes | Result |
|---|---|---|---|---|---|
| Regional elections, 1998 | Nord-Pas-de-Calais | FN | n/a | n/a | Elected |
| Regional elections, 2004 | Nord-Pas-de-Calais | FN | n/a | n/a | Re-elected |
| Regional elections, 2010 | Nord-Pas-de-Calais | FN | n/a | n/a | Re-elected |

European Parliament elections

| Date of election | Constituency | Party | Votes | % of votes | Result |
|---|---|---|---|---|---|
| 2014 European election | North-West France | FN | 4,712,461 | 24.86 | Elected |
