= Damon Mayaffre =

French academic, historian and linguist

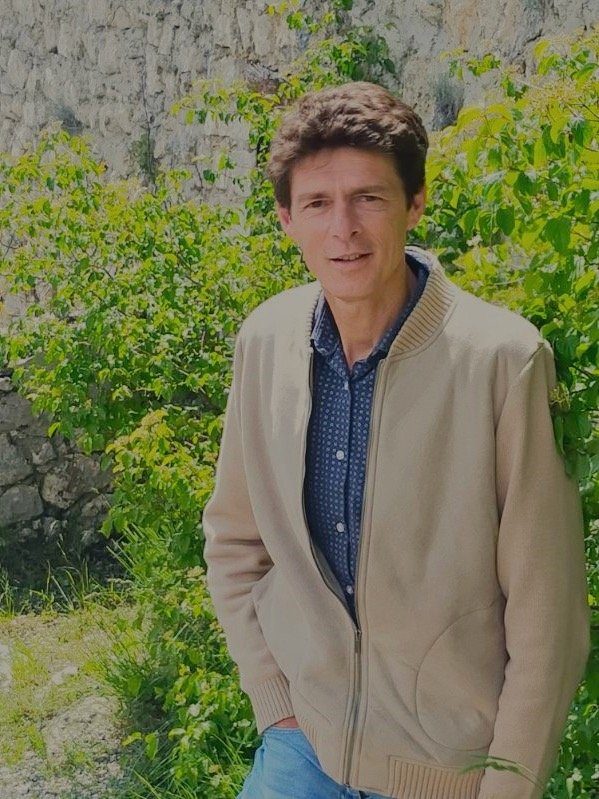
Damon Mayaffre, spring 2023.

Damon Mayaffre (born 1970) is a French academic, historian and linguist, specializing in the analysis of political discourse. He is the author of several books on contemporary French presidential speeches evaluated scientifically and statistically via software-supported analysis.

His early work considers the Interwar period in France, through public speeches by Léon Blum or Maurice Thorez, he follows with work on the public addresses of early presidents of the French Fifth Republic, and more recently those of leaders such as Jacques Chirac, Nicolas Sarkozy and Emmanuel Macron.

Damon Mayaffre holds a doctorate in history and linguistics, oversees research at the French National Centre for Scientific Research (CNRS), and is a professor at the Université Nice-Sophia-Antipolis/Côte d'Azur.

== Methodology ==
To understand the rhetoric of politicians, Damon Mayaffre practices logometry as a method of analysis and interpretation; Logometry is described by Jean-Paul Metzger as a "a set of computerized analytical methods and techniques that allow qualitative and quantitative description of the linguistic matter of a textual corpus".

He processes digitized speech corpora (a large and coherent set of texts) with appropriate software for analysis, to study contrasts, namely Hyperbase created and developed by Étienne Brunet for CNRS - Nice University. His work thus falls within the field of digital humanities that are developing at the beginning of the 21st century.

By reintroducing methodological rigor to the heart of discourse analysis, and by combining bottom-up qualitative approach with AI supported statistical processing of texts, Damon Mayaffre has helped revive French Discourse Analysis whose principles and theories stem from Post-structuralism. French Discourse Analysis was introduced in the 1960s by Michel Pêcheux through his book: Automatic Discourse Analysis, although not translated into English at the time, it found ready reception especially in Italy, Spain, Portugal and several Latin-American countries, and was adopted in the 1970s by a team of scholars working with Jean Dubois (linguist) and Maurice Tournier in the department of political lexicometry, at ENS Saint-Cloud. Mayaffre follows in the footsteps with corpus-driven semantic analysis, nowadays computer-assisted.

== Case studies ==
In his first book: Le poids des mots. Le discours de gauche et de droite dans l'entre-deux-guerres (The Weight of Words: The Discourse of the Left and the Right in the Interwar Period), adapted from his doctoral dissertation, he conducts a lexicometric analysis of several hundred political speeches given or written by the main actors of the period. He identifies that Léon Blum made limited use of the vocabulary pertaining to class struggle in the 1930s, in favor of language more palatable to the public. He also concludes that the rhetoric of Maurice Thorez evolves significantly during the period, moving from a revolutionary and internationalist discourse at the end of the 1920s to a reformist and patriotic discourse after the 1936 victory of the Popular Front.

His book: Le discours présidentiel sous la Vème République. Chirac, Mitterrand, Giscard, Pompidou, de Gaulle, (The presidential discourse under the Fifth Republic) analyzes de Gaulle's patriotic rhetoric, comments on Pompidou's poetic style, draws attention to Giscard's communication errors in the midst of the oil crisis, Mitterrand's egotism, and Chirac's language tactics. On the latter, according to reviewers, Damon Mayaffre shows that President Chirac overuses the adverb "naturally" to assert with confidence things that are far from reality or to articulate with the force of evidence "one thing and its opposite".

The book: Mesure et démesure du discours. Nicolas Sarkozy (2007-2012) (measure and excess) - addresses the French president's language and shows how Sarkozy breaks with the standard presidential discourse with strong and unusual words that are more common in populist language.

His latest book: Macron ou le mystère du verbe. Ses discours décryptés par la machine (Macron or the mystery of the verb. His speeches decoded by the machine) uses artificial Intelligence to analyze Emmanuel Macron's speech patterns. Artificial intelligence algorithms identify that Macron overuses the letter "r" and the prefix "re-" as in "renaissance", "renewal" or "refoundation" to give impetus to his speech, Mayaffre contends that "Macron is as a whole the most linguistically versatile performer of all the Fifth Republic's presidents".

== Publications ==
- Mayaffre, Damon (2000). Le Poids des mots. Le discours de gauche et de droite dans l'entre-deux-guerres. Maurice Thorez, Léon Blum, Pierre-Étienne Flandin et André Tardieu (1928-1939) (in French). Paris: Honoré Champion. ISBN 9782745302670. OCLC 466570336.
- Mayaffre, Damon (2004). Paroles de président. Jacques Chirac (1995-2003) et le discours présidentiel sous la Ve République (in French). Paris: Honoré Champion. ISBN 2745311344. OCLC 56552762.
- Mayaffre Damon with Barbet Denis (2009) "2007. Débats pour l'Élysée". Mots - les Langages du Politique (in French) (89). ENS Editions. 2009. ISBN 9782847881516. OCLC 695047075.
- Mayaffre, Damon (2012). Nicolas Sarkozy : Mesure et démesure du discours (2007-2012) (in French). Paris: Presses de Sciences Po. ISBN 9782724612431. OCLC 793477234.
- Mayaffre, Damon (2012). Le Discours présidentiel sous la Ve République. Chirac, Mitterrand, Giscard, Pompidou, de Gaulle (in French). Paris: Presses de Sciences Po. ISBN 9782724612448. OCLC 1281871285.
- Mayaffre, Damon; Scholz, Ronny (2017). "Constructing 'the French People' - On Sarkozy's Populism" (PDF). Journal of Language and Politics. 16 (5): 683–705. doi:10.1075/jlp.16009.may. populism.
- Mayaffre, Damon (2021). Macron ou le mystère du verbe : Ses discours décryptés par la machine (in French). La tour d’Aigues: Les éditions de l'Aube. ISBN 9782815937467. OCLC 1328058417.
- Mayaffre Damon with Vanni Laurent, (2021) L'intelligence artificielle des textes : Des algorithmes à l'interprétation (in French). Paris: Honoré Champion. 2021. ISBN 9782745356406. OCLC 1257760989.
- Mayaffre Damon with Iezzi Stella and Misuraca Michelangelo (2020) Text Analytics : Advances and Challenges. Studies in Classification, Data Analysis, and Knowledge Organization. Springer. 2020. doi:10.1007/978-3-030-52680-1. ISBN 9783030526801. OCLC 1226294975. S2CID 222262291.

== See also ==
- Data analysis
- Discourse analysis
- Collocation
- Co-occurrence
- Logos
- Pathos
- Ethos
- Performative utterance
