= Jérôme Fourquet =

French political analyst

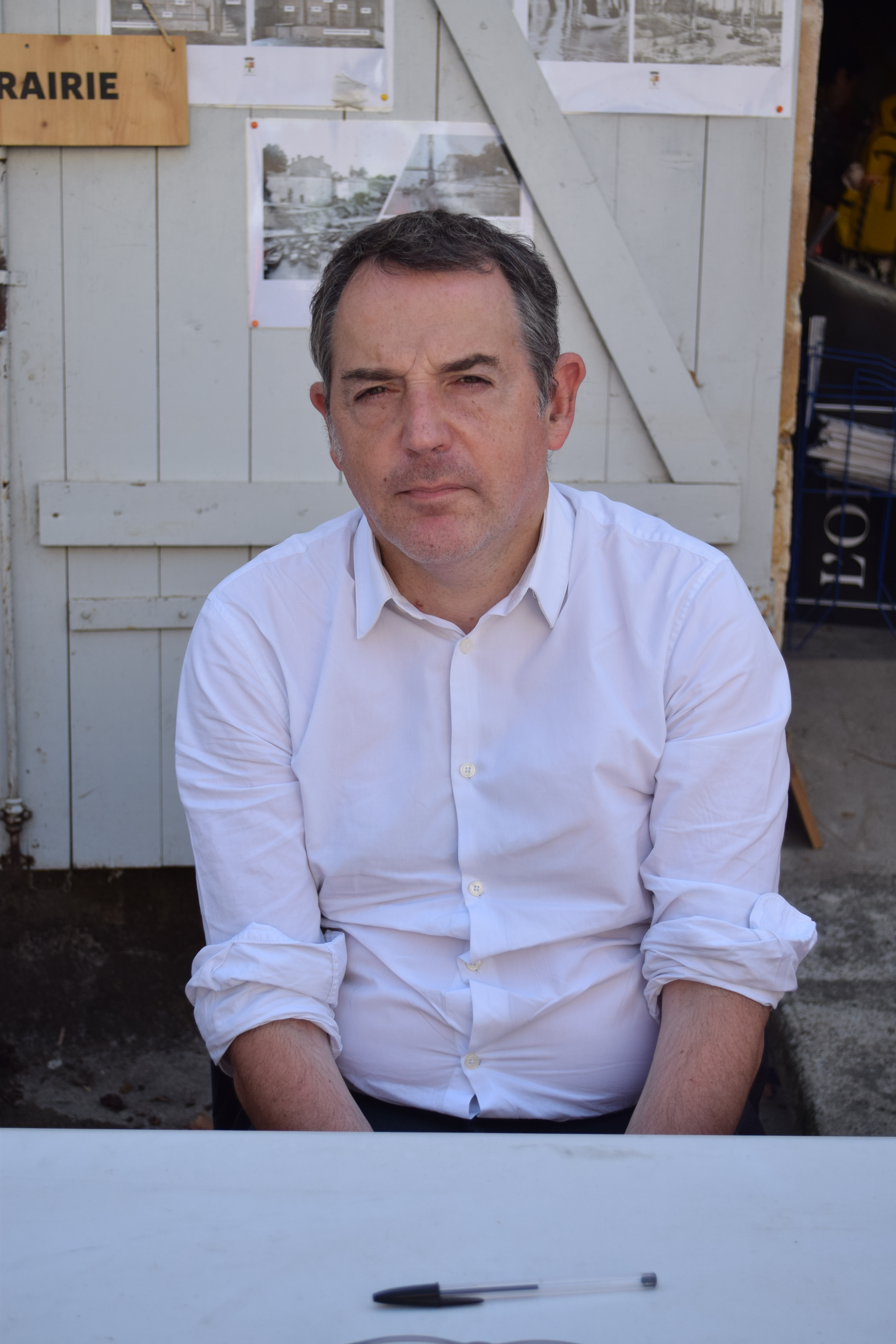
- Fourquet in 2026
- Born: 8 February 1973 (age 53); Le Mans, France
- Education: Sciences Po Rennes; University of Paris 8
- Occupation: Political scientist
- Employer: IFOP

Jérôme Fourquet (born 8 February 1973) is a French political scientist who specialises in the study of opinion polling. Since 2011, he has been the director of the "Public opinion and corporate strategy" department at the French polling organisation Institut français d'opinion publique (IFOP).

== Biography ==
Born in Le Mans, Pays de la Loire, in 1973, his parents were teacher and librarian. He graduated from Sciences Po Rennes and holds a Master of Advanced Studies in electoral geography.

Fourquet worked as an analyst for the polling organisation IFOP between 1996 and 1998, then as director of research at the Institut CSA until 2003. He became director of research at IFOP between December 2003 and February 2006, then deputy director of the "Public opinion and corporate strategy" department until 2011. Since then, he has occupied the department's directorship.
