= Fdesouche =

French far-right website

- Website type: News aggregator, far-right news website
- Available in: French
- Founded: 2005
- Country of origin: France
- Owner: Pierre Sautarel
- Creator: Pierre Sautarel
- Editor: Pierre Sautarel
- Website: www.fdesouche.com
- Commercial: No
- Current status: Online

Fdesouche is a French far-right website founded in 2005 by Pierre Sautarel. It aggregates articles published by other media outlets, primarily focusing on Islam, immigration, and public safety. It is regarded as one of the leading voices of the identitarian movement and the far-right blogosphere.

== History ==
In 2005, Pierre Sautarel launched Fdesouche, originally his personal blog. The blog was suspended by its host over its content, then relaunched as a participatory platform hosted abroad. It aggregates articles published on general-interest news sites, organized around the themes of Islam, immigration, and crime. Several videos published by the site attracted attention beyond its usual readership.

In 2016, when rapper Black M was due to perform at events marking the centenary of the Battle of Verdun, Fdesouche argued he "had no place in Verdun," pointing to lyrics deemed problematic in songs by his former band, Sexion d'Assaut. The phone number of Verdun's town hall was circulated on social media, prompting a wave of hostile calls. The Secretary of State for Veterans and Remembrance, Jean-Marc Todeschini, distanced himself from the town hall, and the concert was cancelled. Sautarel described the mobilization as a division of labor between Fdesouche, responsible for relaying information to a small circle, and politicians responsible for raising broader awareness.

== Contributors ==
=== Pierre Sautarel ===
Pierre Joris Sautarel was born on 13 June 1980 in the 14th arrondissement of Paris. His mother worked in communications and his father in the trade of antique books from the Middle Ages and Renaissance. He spent part of his childhood in a village in Burgundy before spending his adolescence in the 19th arrondissement of Paris, near the Buttes Chaumont. Around age 13, he joined the Kop of Boulogne. From 1993 to 1996, he was active in the Front National de la Jeunesse (FNJ). In 1996, he designed a website for the Yvelines branch of the FNJ. He also claims to have created one of the first French nationalist websites in 1995. In 1999, during the Front National's split, he joined Bruno Mégret's National Republican Movement (MNR). He built the site bruno-megret.com and was involved in the MNR's youth organization, where he was influenced by Pierre Vial. He remained with the MNR until 2002 and then spent a few months around the Unité Radicale movement.

In 2004, he launched Babtoo.com, a community site aimed at "ethnic French people" ("Français de souche"). According to Dominique Albertini and David Doucet, he was a communications contractor for the National Front (FN) between 2006 and 2011, while Éric Dupin gives the dates 2006–2009. He was hired in anticipation of the 2007 French presidential election and, in that capacity, was tasked with redesigning the party's website. He also produced Jean-Marie Le Pen's first video diaries, which were published on the party's website. In 2010, Sautarel was hired by Bruno Gollnisch to create a website covering his activity in the European Parliament. Ahead of the 14th Front National Congress, this close association raised concern among Marine Le Pen's associates that the site might back Gollnisch's candidacy, until Sautarel pledged not to take sides between the two candidates.

Pierre Sautarel lives in a house in Nièvre, in the Morvan.

=== Other contributors ===
Damien Rieu, a Generation Identity official known for occupying the Great Mosque of Poitiers's construction site in 2012 and who later joined Marion Maréchal's team at the FN, and Fabrice Robert, president of the Bloc identitaire, have also been part of the site's team. According to Sautarel, the site is run by a team of five volunteers coordinated remotely through an internal discussion space, with articles selected collectively.

== Relations within the far right ==
=== With the National Front ===
In 2008, Marine Le Pen attended an event bringing together readers of the blog. Sautarel said that, when he worked for the party, she would sometimes ask him for his opinion on current events or on posters. When he was indicted for public defamation against Pierre Henry, executive director of France terre d'asile, following comments posted on the website, she stood by Sautarel. In 2012, during a rally, she denounced a "judicial persecution" targeting the website. According to Georges Moreau, a former member of the FN's web communications unit, by 2014 the site's growing influence had reversed the original balance of power between the FN and Fdesouche, to the point that Marine Le Pen sought the site's attention, including by citing it on television. The Front National nonetheless denied any formal link to the site.

Marine Le Pen called Fdesouche a "superb political machine" and noted that its organizers had structured themselves "as a lobby," pressuring FN officials. Perceptions of the site varied across the party's factions. Figures aligned with an identitarian line, such as Marion Maréchal and Nicolas Bay, viewed the site favorably, while supporters of Florian Philippot were wary of it. After the 15th Front National Congress, Philippot accused Fdesouche of having called for votes against him in the election of the party's central committee; Sautarel later denied any personal attack on Philippot. From 2016 onward, the site frequently cited Maréchal in its press review at Philippot's expense, relaying several polls that put her ahead of him as well as several of her interviews. Antoine Baudino, one of Maréchal's aides, regularly shared the site's posts and Sautarel's comments on social media.

In May 2014, Fdesouche relayed an article from the daily Var-Matin reporting that the FN mayor of Fréjus, David Rachline, might issue an order halting construction of a mosque in the La Gabelle neighborhood. The mosque project, underway since 2011 under the previous Union for a Popular Movement (UMP) administration, had been revived as a campaign issue by Rachline before his election, then set aside afterward. In August 2014, Fdesouche published photographs of the mosque under construction, implicitly noting that the campaign promise had not been kept. According to Louis Aliot, FN's vice-president, many party activists raised the issue with the party following Fdesouche's posts. Aliot regretted that Sautarel had not contacted Rachline directly before publishing. In early October 2014, Rachline announced at a rally that an order suspending the works would soon be issued. The mosque nonetheless opened in early 2016, after several legal proceedings.

=== With Alain Soral ===
Alain Soral criticized Fdesouche for being too timid and for targeting only Muslims rather than Jews as well. While Soral was still an FN member, Fdesouche's publication of a text by Bruno Bilde, an adviser to Marine Le Pen, criticizing the assimilationist line defended by Soral, escalated into a direct conflict between Soral and Sautarel. Soral demanded a right of reply; Sautarel refused and instead published an email in which Soral threatened him. In 2008, at a National Front national council meeting, Soral physically confronted Sautarel, who had come to film the event, pushing him and accusing him of running a site that incited racial hatred against Muslims. Since that altercation, Soral's name has no longer been mentioned on Fdesouche.

=== Within the identitarian movement ===
Among Fdesouche's contributors are Damien Rieu and Fabrice Robert, the latter saying he has known Sautarel since age 14 and that Sautarel provided technical help launching the site Novopress in 2005. Sautarel also names Philippe Vardon, a former Generation Identity head who became a National Front regional councillor in Provence-Alpes-Côte d'Azur, among his longtime friends. In February 2013, Sautarel wrote the preface to the book Sale blanc !, at the request of its author, Bloc identitaire activist Gérald Pichon.

== Editorial line ==
According to Sautarel, the site aims to limit original analysis by its contributors and instead relies on selecting and compiling articles found elsewhere, leaving readers to draw their own conclusions. Researchers Stéphanie Lukasik and Alexandra Salou consider this method of selecting, aggregating, and excerpting journalistic content to be an instance of "réinformation." Albertini and Doucet argue that the lack of prioritization among the selected articles creates, upon reading, a sense of overload that gives the public the impression of a France "occupied" by populations deemed unassimilable, without any counterbalancing viewpoint, while allowing the site to present itself as a mere relay of the press.

Since 2009, the space devoted to reader contributions has been reduced in favor of this press review. A 2011 study by the site dviz.fr, conducted over three months, tracked the origin of articles cited by Fdesouche. French news websites account for 45% of the content, foreign media for 10%, institutional websites for 7%, blogs for 4%, Wikipedia articles for 3%, video platforms for 2%, and explicitly controversial websites for 7%.

In 2008, the website published an average of about 20 articles per day and featured several thematic sections, including one titled "National Re-education," which compiled material purported to demonstrate the political orientation of the French Ministry of National Education, and another titled "Left," which collected speeches by prominent Socialists on immigration. People of foreign or presumed foreign origin involved in the crime stories the website relayed were referred to by the ironic acronym "CPF," for chance pour la France ("a chance for France"). The site's founder said at the time that he was primarily targeting an audience of "French-speaking whites," while maintaining that the blog remained open to everyone.

Sautarel described a conception of identity distinct from the one championed by the National Front, stating: "For the FN, identity is an administrative notion. [...] We feel closer to a Belgian or a French-speaking Swiss person than to an Ivorian who has obtained French citizenship, because we share the same ethnocultural sphere." Sautarel identifies with the identitarian movement, which places peoples' ethnocultural substance above all other considerations and rejects racial mixing, on the grounds that harmonious coexistence between different human groups is impossible.

Comments posted under articles are automatically deleted five days after publication, and registration is required both to post and to read them. Sautarel noted that readers' comments provide him with some of his ideas for articles.

== Reliability ==
The website is regularly called out by fact-checking websites for publishing content that lacks rigor, and claims it does not verify the content of its posts, citing its role as a mere aggregator. According to a ranking of misinformation spreaders compiled by Le Monde covering 101 identified fake news, Fdesouche ranked fourth, with nine erroneous publications.

== Funding ==
The website is funded through subscriptions from its readers, without encountering the fundraising challenges faced by traditional news platforms. According to Sautarel, legal trouble tends to increase donations, and donation totals can vary sharply depending on current events. Unlike Alain Soral's Égalité et Réconciliation website, which has its own online store, Fdesouche has not developed a comparable commercial structure.

In 2011, journalist Emmanuel Ratier attempted to turn the website into a right-wing equivalent of Mediapart, bringing together contributors close to Radio Courtoisie around a paid-subscription model, but the project did not materialize. According to Gilles Moreau, Pierre Sautarel reportedly backed out of this partnership for fear of associating his website with "the old, folkloric far right," given that he was seeking to reach an electorate more aligned with the UMP or the Union of Democrats and Independents.

In early 2016, an advertising manager for the weekly Valeurs actuelles contacted Sautarel to host an ad for the magazine's daily newsletter on Fdesouche. The ad ran for two months to Fdesouche's readers.

== Audience ==
In 2016, the site's Facebook page had 243,000 "likes," and Sautarel claimed around 130,000 registered users, with simultaneous connections frequently reaching 2,000 to 2,500 users. He claimed between 80,000 and 120,000 unique visitors per day. Traffic grew in steps, driven by the most prominent news stories, which attracted new audiences.

In 2017, Le Monde reported that Fdesouche readers bought up several farmhouses in a Morvan village they nicknamed "la Desouchière."

== Legal case ==
In 2021, following revelations by journalist Taha Bouhafs, the Commission nationale de l'informatique et des libertés launched an investigation following the discovery on Fdesouche of a file listing public figures labeled as "Islamo-leftists," categorized by profession and with their presumed political and religious affiliations noted. About 50 complaints have been filed by people on this list. A second file, listing 797 migrant aid groups, was also discovered on the website. Sautarel downplayed the revelations, saying the first file simply reproduced the signatories of an appeal published by Mediapart against Islamophobia, and that the second came from a "pro-migrant collective" intended to map its own initiatives.

== Bibliography ==
- Albertini, Dominique; Doucet, David (2014). Histoire du Front national. Texto. Paris: Tallandier. p. 384. ISBN 979-10-210-0724-6.
- Albertini, Dominique; Doucet, David (2016). La Fachosphère: Comment l'extrême droite remporte la bataille d'Internet. Enquête. Paris: Flammarion. p. 320. ISBN 978-2-08-135490-6.
- Dupin, Éric (2017). La France identitaire: Enquête sur la réaction qui vient. Cahiers libres. Paris: La Découverte. ISBN 978-2-7071-9484-8.
- Lukasik, Stéphanie; Salou, Alexandra (2023). "La réinformation ou l'amplification socionumérique de la désinformation". Balisages (7). doi:10.35562/balisages.1200.
