= Damien Rieu =

French far-right activist, political communicator, and political consultant

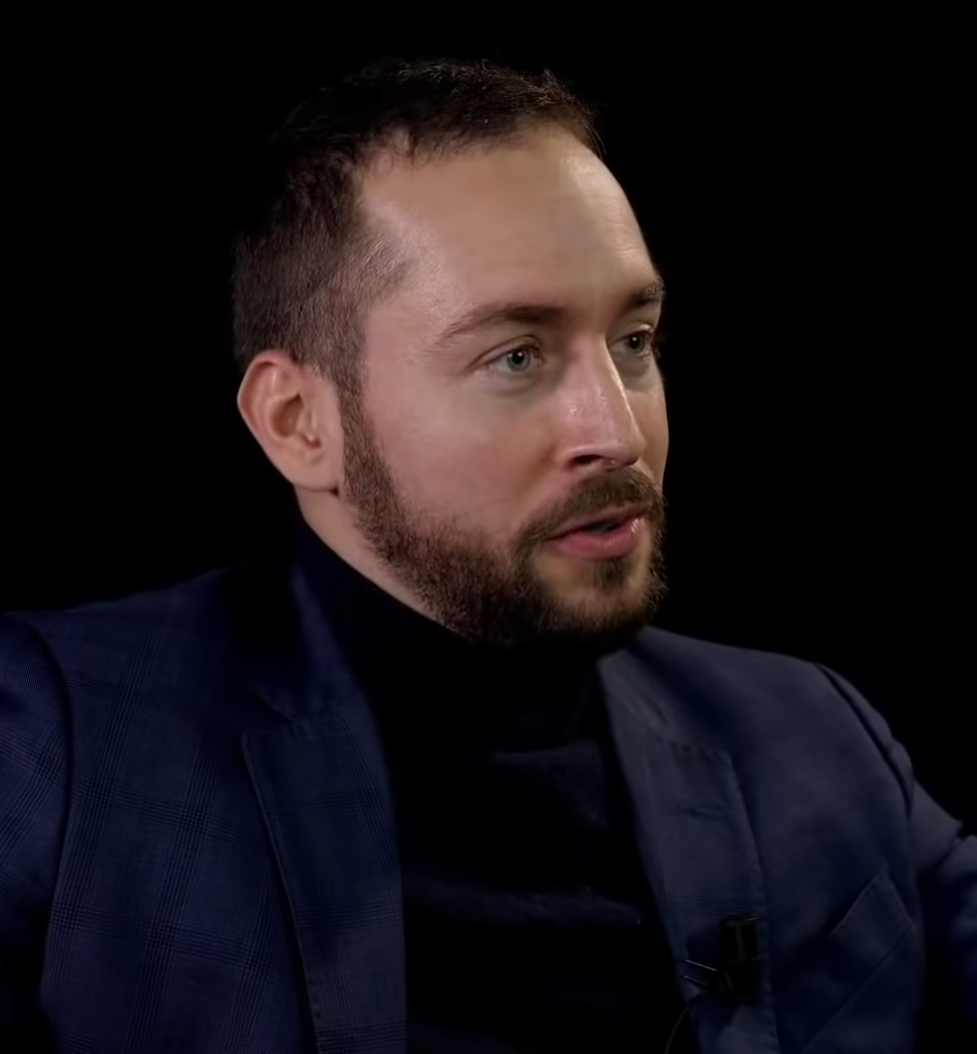
- Damien Rieu in January 2022.
- Pronunciation: /damjɛ̃ ʁjø/
- Born: Damien Lefèvre; August 27, 1989 (age 37); Lyon
- Occupations: Activist, political communicator, political consultant
- Years active: 2007–present
- Employer: Marion Maréchal
- Organization: SOS Chrétiens d'Orient
- Political party: Identity–Liberties (2024–present)
- Other political affiliations: Les Identitaires (2007–2015); National Rally (2007, 2015–2022); Reconquête (2022–2024)
- Movement: Identitarian movement
- Website: https://damienrieu.fr/

Damien Rieu (born 27 August 1989) is a French far-right activist, political communicator, and political consultant.

He became active as a teenager in the Front national de la jeunesse (FNJ), then within the Bloc identitaire, and in 2012 co-founded its youth wing Generation Identity, of which he became the spokesperson. After working for several far-right elected representatives, notably Marion Maréchal, he stood as a National Rally (RN) candidate in the 2021 departmental elections. In 2022, he joined Éric Zemmour's presidential campaign and subsequently the Reconquête party, becoming its spokesperson and vice-president, before becoming Maréchal's parliamentary assistant in the European Parliament.

He advocates remigration and supports the Great Replacement conspiracy theory. His communication strategy, centred on social media, has led to him being convicted on several occasions for defamation and cyberbullying.

== Biography ==
=== Early life ===
Damien Lefèvre was born on 27 August 1989 in Lyon. He grew up there before his family moved to Villeurbanne. His father allegedly served as treasurer of a local chapter of the French Communist Party. He says he was initially involved in left-wing politics, wearing t-shirts bearing Che Guevara's image and participating in protests against the National Front, before adopting anti-immigration views as a teenager. He has claimed that during his schooling he was the only white, non-Muslim pupil in his classes, an experience he presents as formative for his subsequent activism.

He joined the Front national de la jeunesse in 2007 at the age of 17. He adopted the pseudonym Damien Rieu to avoid being identified, given his family's opposition to far-right activism. He chose the name "Rieu" after seeing a poster of the Dutch violinist André Rieu. According to his own account, while taking part in an FNJ campaign tour, an attack targeted the activists present. Police allegedly contacted his father to come pick him up, and his father subsequently kicked him out of the family home after discovering his involvement.

He then found himself in a shelter for young workers, where he again described himself as "the only white person". Staff at one of the shelters he stayed at described him at the time as a quiet young man who did not discuss his political views. Rieu then left the FNJ, which he considered insufficiently active and unsupportive of him during this episode, and joined Rebeyne, the Lyon-based youth wing of the Bloc identitaire. He subsequently studied at Paris-Panthéon-Assas University and then at Sup de Com Lyon.

=== Activism ===
In 2008, Rieu contacted Pierre Sautarel, founder of the far-right website Fdesouche, and joined its contributor team. In 2021, he targeted a 2.5 million-euro grant awarded by the city of Strasbourg to the Eyyûb Sultan mosque, which has ties to the Turkish organisation Millî Görüş, amplifying the story with Fdesouche under accusations of "Islamo-clientelism". The Interior Minister subsequently announced that the government would refer the matter to the administrative courts to block the project, on the grounds that the mosque had not signed the Charter of Principles of Islam in France.

In 2010, he took part with Rebeyne in an action against a halal-certified Quick restaurant in Villeurbanne. The video of the operation was viewed several hundred thousand times online. In 2012, he co-founded Generation Identity, becoming its spokesperson. That same year, he took part in occupying the roof of the Great Mosque of Poitiers construction site, where a banner reading "732, Génération identitaire" was unfurled, referencing the Battle of Tours. In 2017, he was sentenced in the first instance to a €40,000 fine and a one-year suspended prison term for incitement to national, racial, and religious discrimination and for damage to another person's property committed as part of a group in connection with these acts. In 2020, Rieu was acquitted on appeal due to a procedural error. In 2013, he was fined, along with 18 other Generation Identity activists, after climbing the wall of the Socialist Party headquarters, where they installed a banner reading "Hollande démission" ("Hollande resign") during a La Manif pour tous march.

In 2015, he officially left Generation Identity to join the National Front, but nevertheless maintained ties to the movement and helped organise some of its operations. In 2016, he took part in a symbolic bridge blockade in Calais intended to prevent migrants from crossing. In 2018, he organised and carried out a blockade of the Col de l'Échelle in the Hautes-Alpes, a crossing point for migrants arriving from Italy. The operation mobilised dozens of Generation Identity activists, and Rieu rented helicopters to photograph the event. The operation was praised by Marine Le Pen. Rieu, Generation Identity spokesperson Romain Espino, and a third activist were convicted at first instance in 2019 and sentenced to six months' imprisonment, a €2,000 fine and five years' loss of civic rights for these actions; the Generation Identity association itself was fined €75,000. On appeal in 2020, Generation Identity and its activists were acquitted.

In 2013, alongside a French delegation composed largely of figures from the radical far right, Rieu took part in the founding mission of the association SOS Chrétiens d'Orient (SOSCO), an NGO defending Christians in the Middle East with close ties to Bashar al-Assad's regime. He also carried out missions for the organisation in Egypt and Iraq, including in the Christian town of Bakhdida, which he left only days before it fell to the Islamic State in August 2014. He remained involved with SOSCO at least until 2016.

=== Political career ===
In 2014, while participating in a work-study program at Janus, a Lyon-based political communications agency, he spent six months working for the town hall of Bollène, in Vaucluse, then led by Marie-Claude Bompard, before becoming deputy director of communications at the town hall of Beaucaire, in Gard, led by Julien Sanchez, and digital communications manager for Marion Maréchal. In this role, he initially worked remotely, and has said he only grew closer to her during the campaign for the 2015 French regional elections. This relationship led, from spring 2016, to a paid position with the Regional Council of Provence-Alpes-Côte d'Azur, attached to the National Front group she chaired. He worked for her until 2017. In 2018, he was hired as a parliamentary aide by MP Gilbert Collard. The collaboration ended quickly; according to Libération, the MP was uncomfortable with the identitarian activist's media exposure. In 2019, he became parliamentary assistant to MEP Philippe Olivier. In 2021, he stood as a National Rally candidate, alongside Yaël Ménaché, in the departmental elections in the canton of Péronne, in the Somme. The pair topped the first round, with 31.55% of votes cast. He was defeated in the second round by the left-wing pair Christophe Boulogne and Valérie Kumm, who took 44.94% of the vote.

In 2022, he announced his support for Éric Zemmour's presidential campaign. He explained his departure from the National Rally by pointing to what he saw as the party's declining momentum, arguing it was no longer mobilising either voters or activists. Political scientist Jean-Yves Camus, however, suggested that Rieu's move to Zemmour's party, Reconquête, could be a career move, as the party offered more available positions than the National Rally. Within Zemmour's campaign team, Rieu took charge of the digital response unit, alongside digital strategy director Samuel Lafont and adviser Jean-Yves Le Gallou. Rieu held the positions of party spokesperson and vice-president. In the 2022 French legislative election, he stood as a candidate in the Alpes-Maritimes's 4th constituency. He secured 10.66% of the votes cast and was therefore eliminated in the first round. In 2024, he was placed twelfth on the Reconquête list for the 2024 European Parliament election in France, led by Marion Maréchal. He subsequently became her parliamentary assistant at the European Parliament.

== Political positions ==
Damien Rieu describes himself as an "Indigenous" person of France and Europe, engaged in a struggle for the survival of his identity, which he says is threatened by what he calls a "genocide by replacement". A proponent of the concept of remigration, he has called for the return to their countries of origin of "millions upon millions of immigrants" whom he accuses of causing this so-called "population substitution". In 2014, he defined remigration as "the voluntary or forced return of non-European settlers brought into France". During his 2021 election campaign, he offered a narrower definition, limited to the deportation of foreign criminals and offenders. He regards civil war as a likely scenario absent a change in immigration policy, citing the precedents of the Lebanese Civil War and the Kosovo War. He supports the Great Replacement conspiracy theory. On Islam, he argues it constitutes a "political religion" incompatible with French society, and views immigration as the vector of its establishment in the country. Historian Nicolas Lebourg situates him within the nativist movement.

== Media strategy ==
On social media, he frequently posts content linking terrorism to immigration and Islam, a practice he presents as a tool for political awareness-raising. In 2018, he took part, alongside the Fdesouche team, in a collective effort to dig up controversial information about singer Mennel Ibtissem, then a contestant on The Voice – La plus belle voix, and threatened broadcaster TF1 with a "war on Twitter" if it did not act; the contestant withdrew from the show two days later, an episode he has since described as a victory. Journalist David Doucet compared this method of combing through the social media accounts of media figures from minority backgrounds to tactics popularised by the American alt-right against journalists at The New York Times and CNN. Rieu has also claimed involvement in online smear campaigns targeting candidates in the 2017 French presidential election, who were referred to on social media by nicknames insinuating ties to Islam. Among his other actions, he cites the cancellation of a concert by rapper Médine at the Bataclan and prosecution for incitement to racial hatred against an imam in Toulouse. Political scientist Gaël Brustier has described Rieu as an "excellent propagandist".

== Legal affairs ==
In 2020, Rieu published two tweets about footballer Karim Benzema linking him to jihadism. Benzema filed a defamation complaint in 2022. He was acquitted in 2023.

In 2017, Rieu leaked a video on Twitter in which a journalist criticised Marion Maréchal, and subsequently published her phone number. The journalist was then subjected to a campaign of cyberbullying, racist insults and malicious calls. In 2024, he was sentenced to an eight-month suspended prison sentence and fined 4,000 euros.

In 2021, Xavier Bertrand brought a criminal complaint, joining the proceedings as a civil party, against Rieu after he shared a leaflet on Twitter during the regional election campaign, which, amongst other things, accused the regional president of promoting political Islam in his regional policy. In 2022, the court ruled that the public prosecution had lapsed due to the expiry of the limitation period. However, the court dismissed the defence's plea that the complaint was invalid.

In 2025, Rieu was convicted of defamation against Patrick Karam. In 2026, he was convicted of defamation against Karam a second time, and was fined 1,000 euros, ordered to pay 2,000 euros in damages for moral injury, and 3,000 euros in legal costs. The case stemmed from 2024 remarks in which Rieu accused Karam of supporting Mohammed Henniche, a former rector of a mosque in Pantin, whom Rieu holds partly responsible for the murder of Samuel Paty. The court found he could not claim good faith given his lack of caution in making the statements and his personal animosity toward the plaintiff.

== Bibliography ==
- Henry, Michel (26 January 2017). La Nièce: Le phénomène Marion Maréchal-Le Pen (in French). Paris: Seuil. ISBN 978-2-02-133778-5.
