= Uthman Mosque =

Mosque in Villeurbanne, Lyon Metropolis, France

- Mosquée de Othmane
- Location of the mosque in Lyon

Religion
- Affiliation: Sunni Islam
- Ecclesiastical or organizational status: Mosque
- Status: Active

Location
- Location: 51 Rue Octavie, Villeurbanne, Lyon Metropolis, Rhône
- Country: France
- Interactive map of Uthman Mosque
- Coordinates: 45°46′44″N 4°53′21″E

Architecture
- Type: Mosque
- Completed: 2006

Specifications
- Dome: 1
- Site area: 1,200 m^{2} (13,000 sq ft)

Website
- mosquee-othmane.org (in French)

The Uthman Mosque, also known as the Othman Mosque (French: Mosquée de Othmane), is a mosque located in Villeurbanne, near Lyon, in the department of Rhône, France.

Situated in a three-storey building that was funded by French Muslims, the mosque was inaugurated on 1 April 2006 and covers 1,200 square metres (13,000 sq ft) including a large library and an Arabic school that caters for 250 students.

== See also ==
- Islam in France
- List of mosques in France
