= Sahaba Mosque =

Mosque in Créteil, France

- Mosquée Sahaba de Créteil
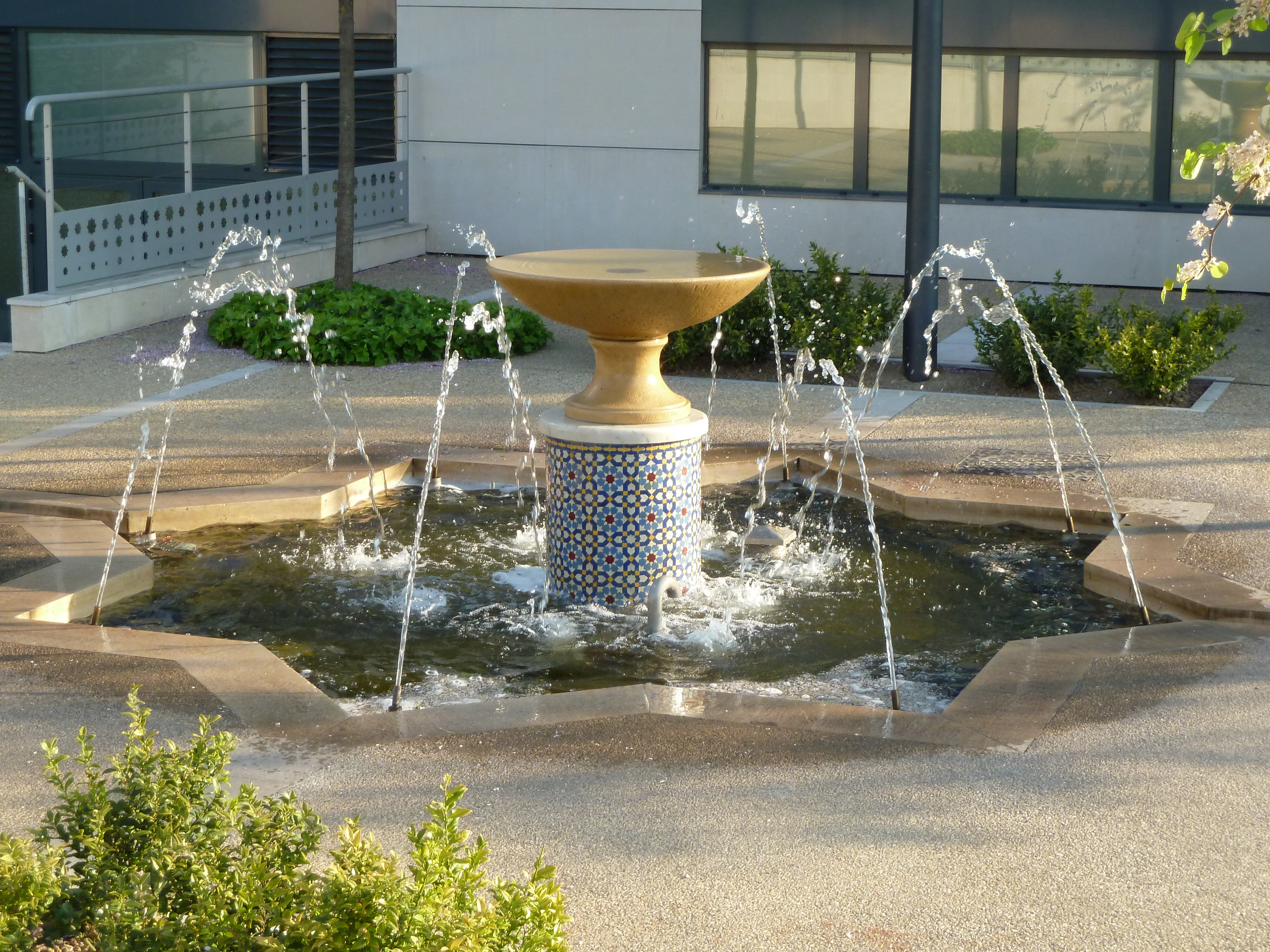
- The waterjet at the mosque

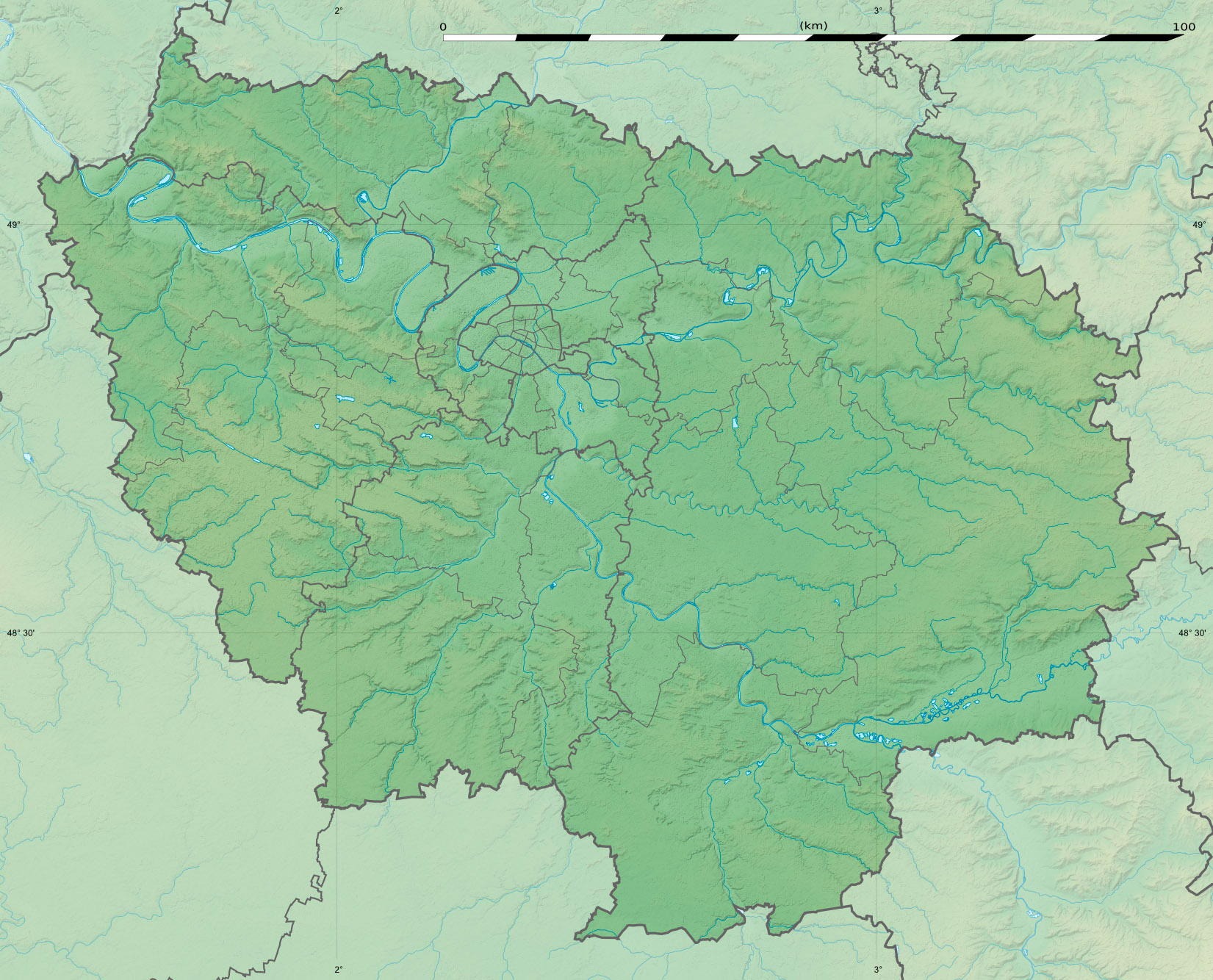
- Location of the mosque in Île-de-France

Religion
- Affiliation: Sunni Islam
- Ecclesiastical or organizational status: Mosque
- Status: Active

Location
- Location: Créteil, Val-de-Marne, Île-de-France
- Country: France
- Interactive map of Sahaba Mosque
- Administration: Union of Muslim Associations of Créteil
- Coordinates: 48°46′52″N 2°26′46″E

Architecture
- Architect: Hubert Anas Hamdallah
- Type: Mosque
- Style: Contemporary
- Groundbreaking: October 2006
- Completed: 2008
- Construction cost: c. €5.5 million

Specifications
- Interior area: 4,000 m^{2} (43,000 sq ft)
- Site area: 1,200 m^{2} (13,000 sq ft)

The Sahaba Mosque (French: Mosquée Sahaba de Créteil; Arabic: مسجد الصحابة في كريتيل) is a mosque located in Créteil, in the department of Val-de-Marne, in the Île-de-France region of France. The mosque is located at the corner of rue Jean-Gabin and the access road to route de Choisy.

== Overview ==
The mosque has a surface area of 1,200 square metres (13,000 sq ft) and a total built area of 4,000 square metres (43,000 sq ft), spread over three levels. The part devoted to places of prayer is supplemented by spaces for cultural and leisure purposes, such as a library, multipurpose rooms, a restaurant-tea room and a hammam.

The mosque is managed by the Union of Muslim Associations of Créteil.

The laying of the cornerstone took place on October 4, 2006 in the presence of the deputy mayor of Créteil Laurent Cathala, the prefect of Val-de-Marne, the president of the Departmental Council of Val-de-Marne, the imam of the Great Mosque of Créteil, the Roman Catholic bishop of Créteil, and the rabbi of Créteil. The mosque opened its doors on December 3, 2008.

Funded by €3 million in donations and €1 million by the Commune of Créteil, via its Cultural Office, the mosque was initially estimated to cost €4 million, By the time the mosque was completed, approximately €5.5 million had been expended.

== Inter-faith reactions ==
The mosque was proposed in 2004. At that time, Daniel Labille, the Catholic Bishop of Créteil commented:

I completely understand the desire of this community to have a place of worship. The French constitution guarantees freedom of belief, and yet Muslims do not have a place of worship, worthy of the name, to practice their religion. The installation of a mosque in Créteil therefore seems completely normal to me. The best service that we can provide to a community is to prevent it from closing in on itself, it is to try to have relationships with it. From this point of view, the mosque can be a factor of integration. Of course, we can fantasize about Islam while immediately thinking of fundamentalism. I think we need to overcome this fear. Refusing to let this community live its religion openly, like other religions, would be the best way to encourage extremism.

André Benayoun, president of the Jewish community of Créteil commented at the same time:

The Jewish community of Créteil is in favor of the construction of a mosque in Créteil, following the example of all the religious communities of the city which have places of assembly and dignified prayers. This place of worship will allow the Muslim community to feel better integrated into the city of Créteil, which has the motto “Living together”.

== See also ==
- Islam in France
- List of mosques in France
