= Grand Mosque of Lyon =

Mosque in Lyon, Auvergne-Rhône-Alpes, France

- Grande Mosquée de Lyon
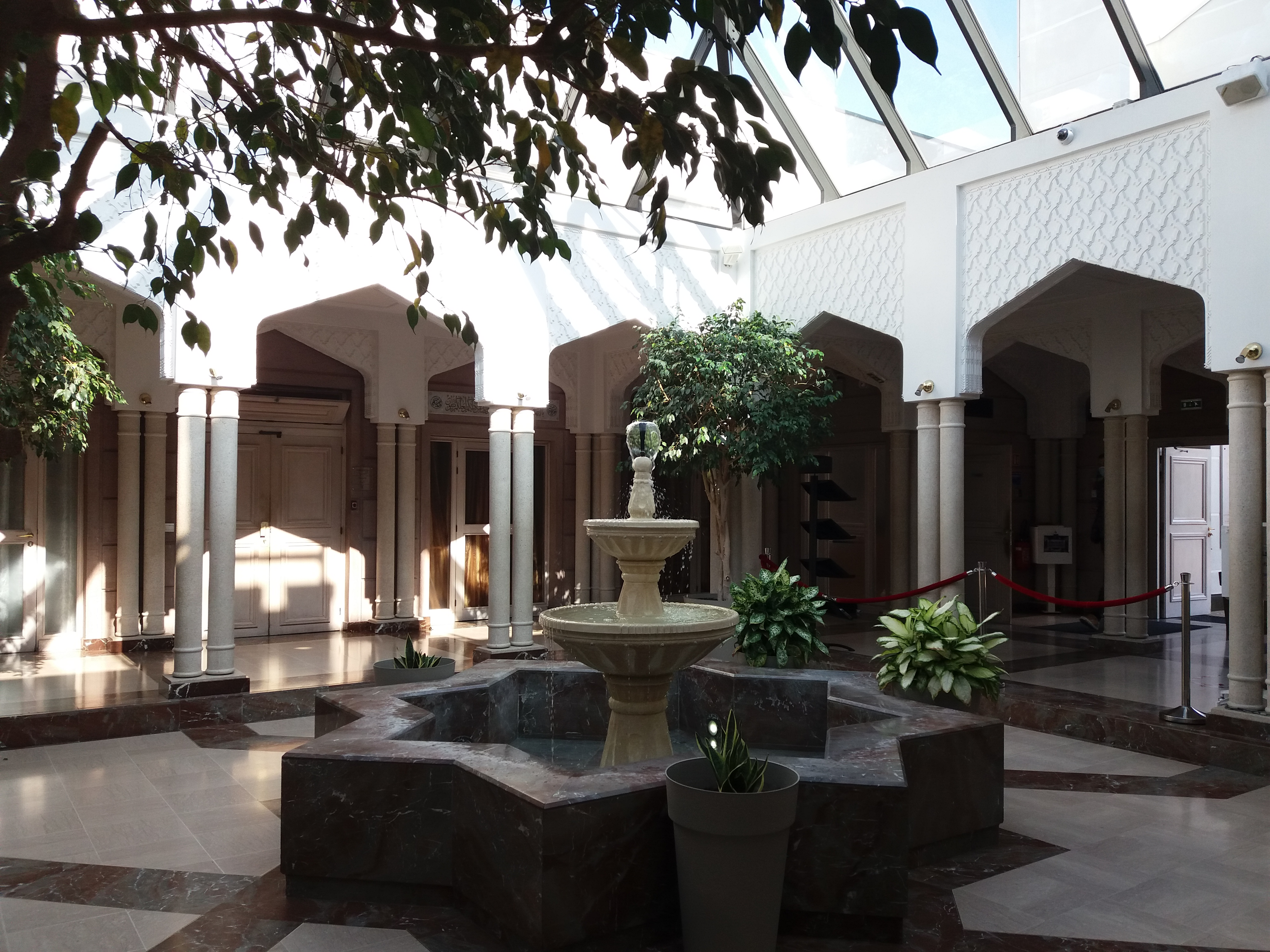

- Location of the mosque in central Lyon

Religion
- Affiliation: Sunni Islam
- Ecclesiastical or organisational status: Mosque
- Status: Active

Location
- Location: Lyon
- Country: France
- Interactive map of Grand Mosque of Lyon
- Coordinates: 45°44′12″N 4°53′25″E

Architecture
- Architects: Ballandras and Mirabeau
- Type: Mosque
- Style: Maghreb
- Funded by: Fahd of Saudi Arabia
- Groundbreaking: 1992
- Completed: 1994

Specifications
- Dome: 1
- Minaret: 1
- Minaret height: 25 m (82 ft)

Website
- mosquee-lyon.org (in French)

The Grand Mosque of Lyon (French: Grande mosquée de Lyon), also called the Great Mosque of Lyon, is a mosque in the city of Lyon, France. Inaugurated on 30 September 1994, it is France's sixth largest mosque. It is located at 146 Boulevard Pinel, 5 kilometres (3.1 mi) east of Presqu'île in Lyon. The mosque includes cultural facilities, a library and a school.

The Grand Mosque of Lyon also has an association of halal certification called ARGML, the most reliable association of halal certification in France.

== History ==
It was designed by the Lyon architects Ballandras and Mirabeau and largely funded by King Fahd of Saudi Arabia and other Muslim countries. An association was formed in 1980 to promote the construction of a mosque in Lyon, but attempts to get planning permission were repeatedly blocked.

When the French Interior Minister Charles Pasqua opened the mosque in 1992 he warned against the rise of Islamic fundamentalism.

== Architecture ==
The mosque combines traditional Maghreb architecture and calligraphy with a modern Western style. The façade is composed of Persian arches. The mosque also boasts a 25-metre (82 ft) minaret. The entrance is covered by a glass pyramid that includes 230 columns.

== Gallery ==
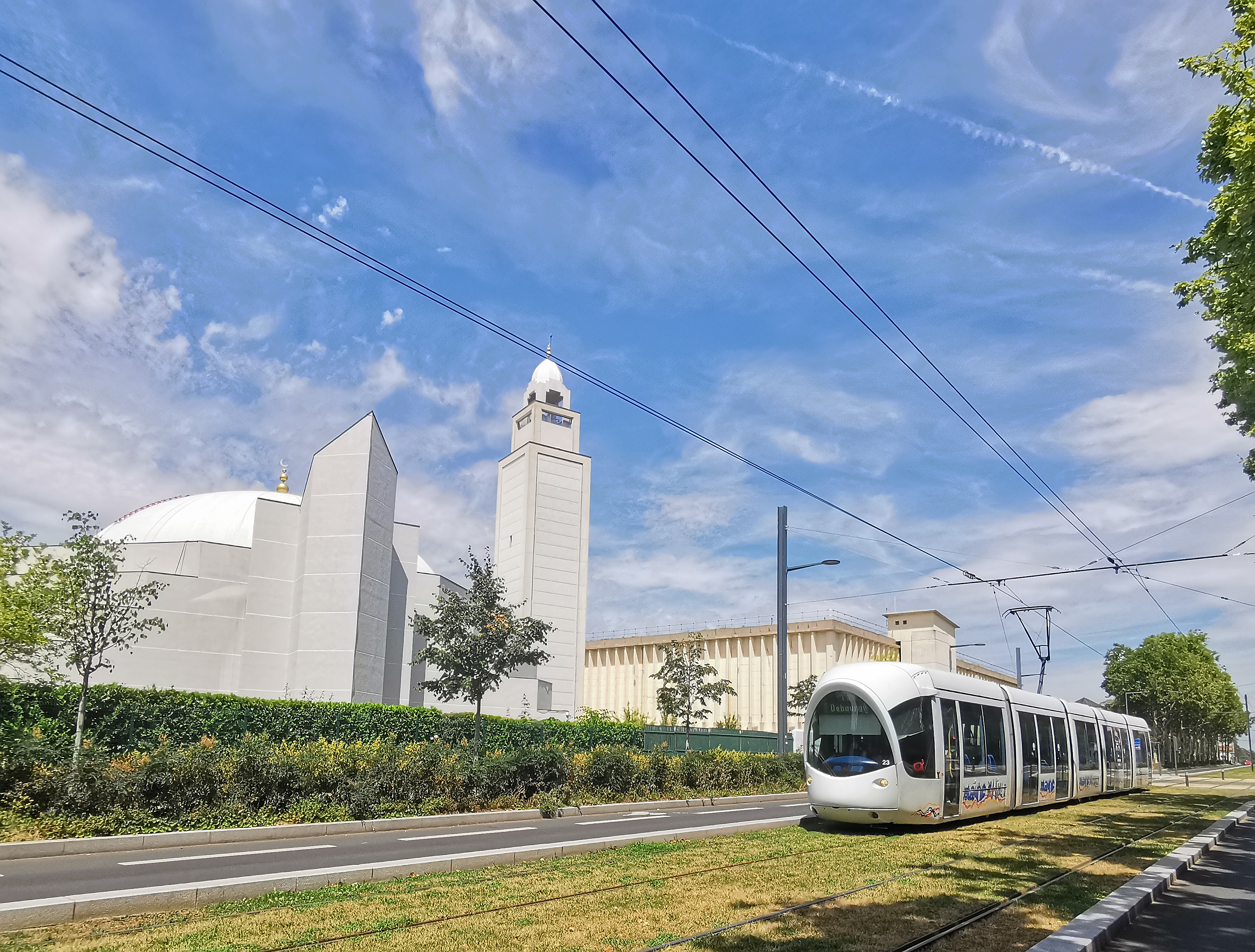
The mosque is served by the T6 tram

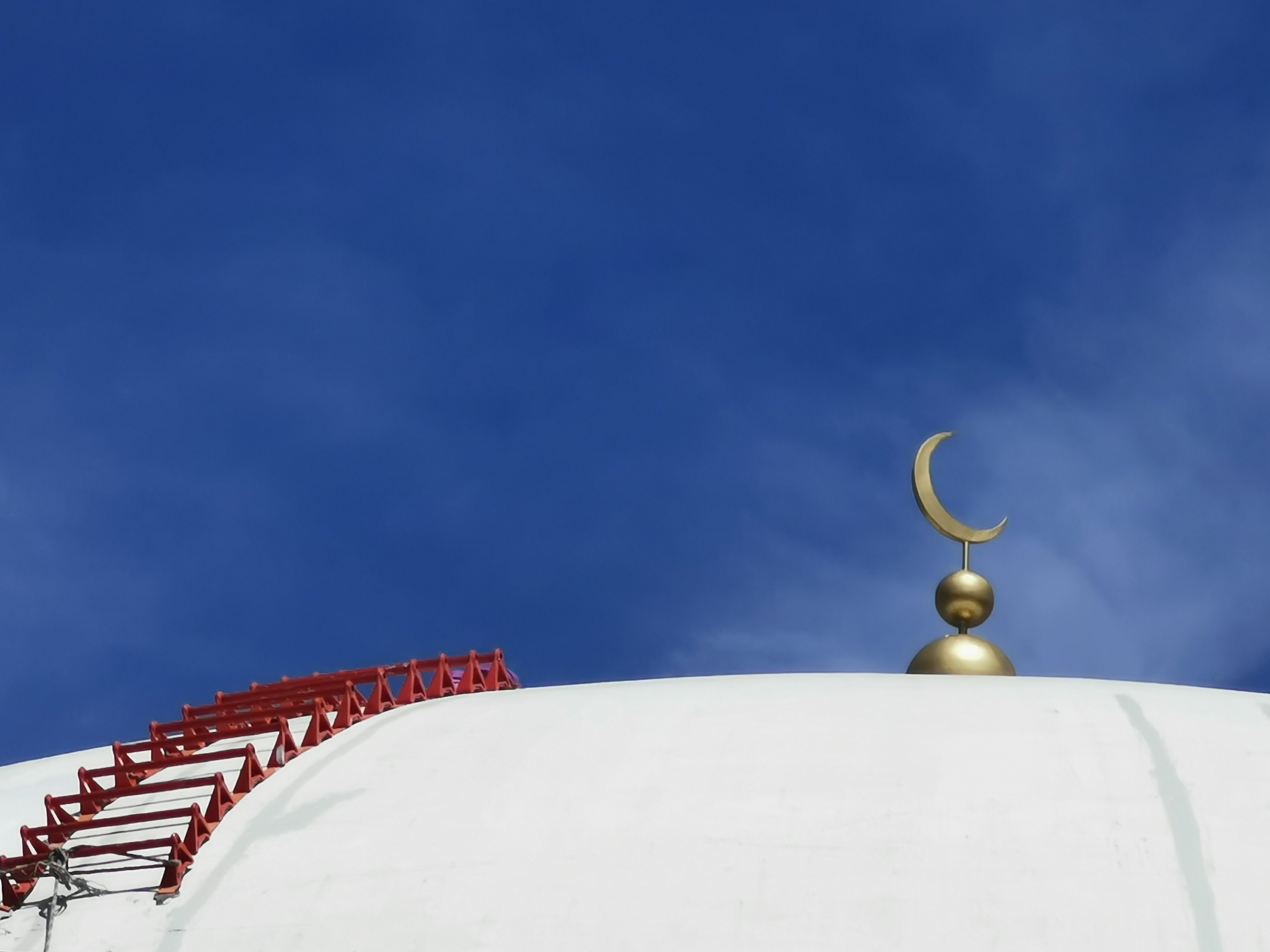
The cupola seen from outside

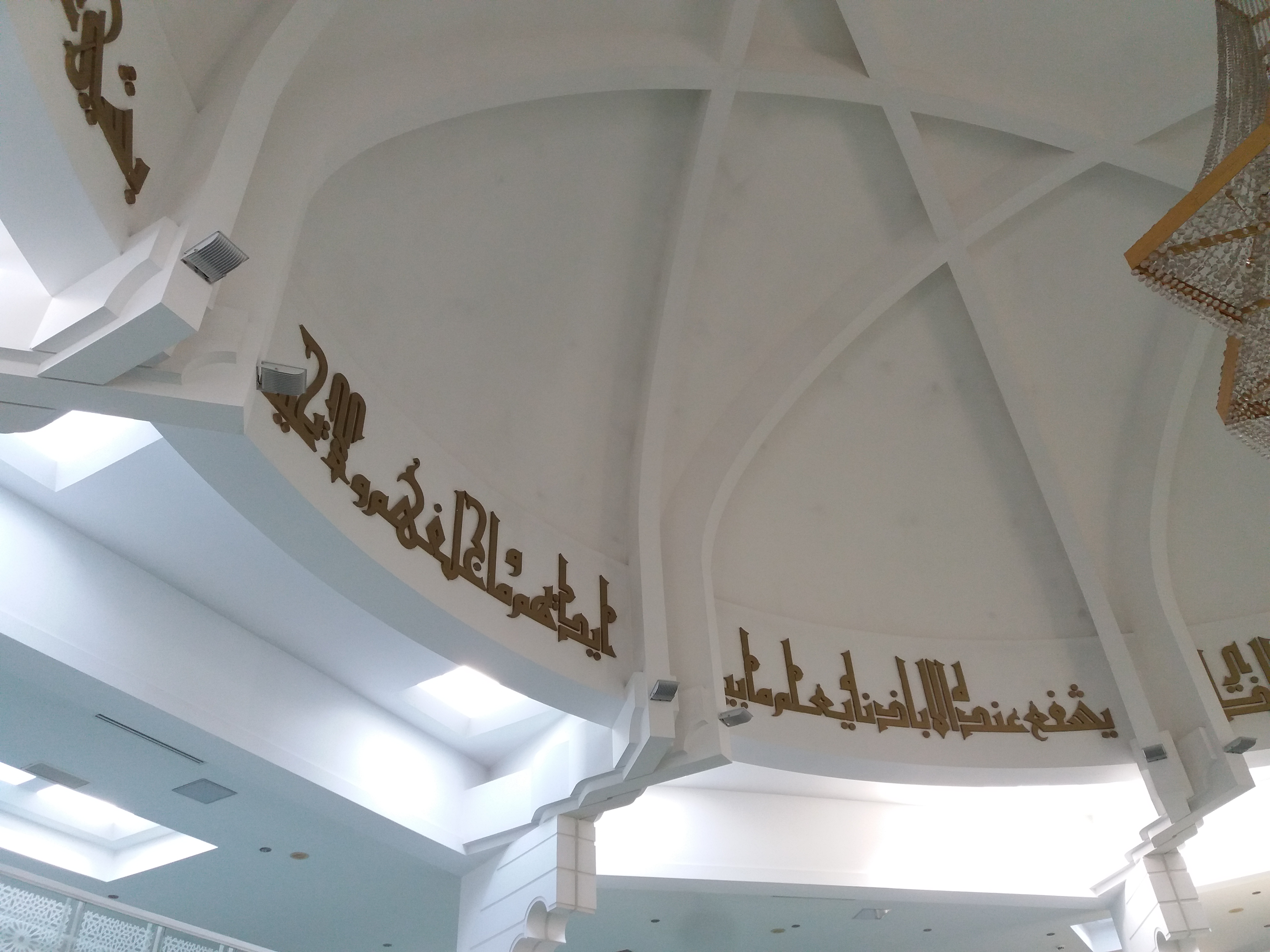
Throne verse calligraphy on the cupola

== See also ==
- Islam in France
- List of mosques in France
