= Mosque al-Nour =

Mosque in Mulhouse, France

Mosque An-Nour
- Mosquée An-Nour
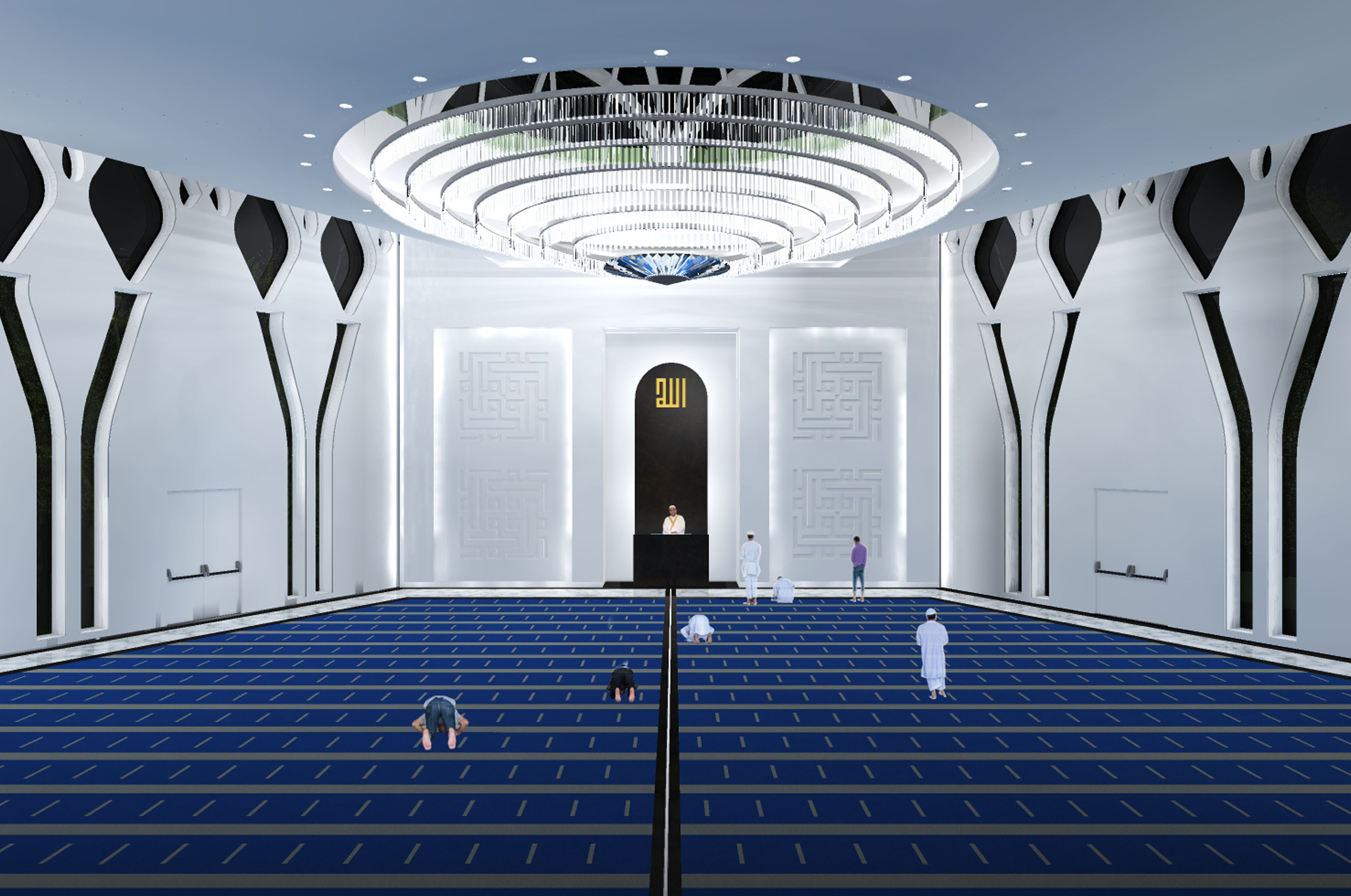
- Artist's rendition of the prayer hall interior, with dome, in 2011

- Location of the mosque in the Grand Est region

Religion
- Affiliation: Islam
- Ecclesiastical or organizational status: Mosque; Cultural center
- Status: Active

Location
- Location: 178 rue d'illzach, Mulhouse, Haut-Rhin, Grand Est
- Country: France
- Interactive map of Mosque An-Nour
- Administration: Alsace Muslims Association (AMAL)
- Coordinates: 47°45′45″N 7°21′03″E

Architecture
- Architect: AMRS Architectes
- Type: Mosque
- Style: Contemporary Islamic
- Funded by: Qatar Ministry of Awqaf and Islamic Affairs; Qatar Charity
- Groundbreaking: 2010
- Completed: 2019

Specifications
- Capacity: 2,300 worshipers
- Interior area: 1,700 m^{2} (18,000 sq ft)
- Dome: 1
- Site area: 11,000 m^{2} (120,000 sq ft)

Website
- centreannour.org (in French)

The Mosque al-Nour, also known as the Mosque an-Nour, (French: Mosquée An-Nour or Centre An-Nour) is a mosque and cultural center located in Mulhouse, in the department of Haut-Rhin, in the Grand Est region of France. The construction of the mosque and cultural center commenced in 2010 and was completed in 2019. With capacity for 2,300 worshipers, it is reportedly the largest mosque in Europe.

The main funders of the mosque's construction were the Qatar Ministry of Awqaf and Islamic Affairs and Qatar Charity, including Muslims living in Kuwait and Qatar, with funds administered by the Alsace Muslim Association (Association des musulmans d'Alsace).

== History ==
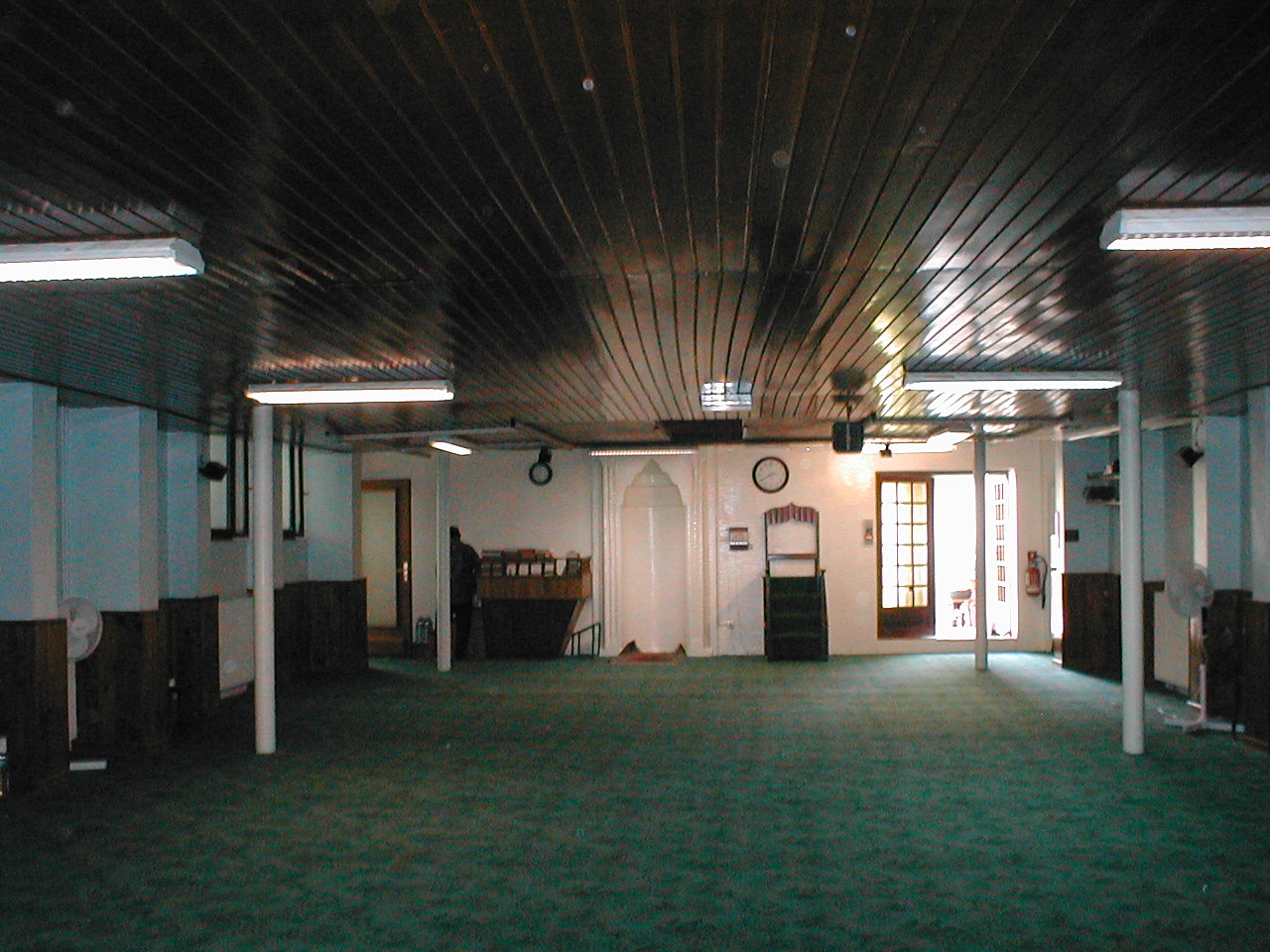
Interior of the first mosque, c. 2010

The Alsace Muslim Association (AMAL) was established in 1973. AMAL is affiliated with the Union of Islamic Organizations of France (Union des Organisations Islamiques de France, abbreviated as UOIF), an umbrella organization that includes over 250 Muslim entities on French soil with strong ties to the Muslim Brotherhood.

The first AMAL facilities, including a mosque with capacity of 2,000 worshipers, plus three classrooms, a butcher's shop and a bookstore, was established at 41, rue Neppert in Mulhouse. As the Muslim community in Mulhouse grew, AMAL began to plan for a larger mosque and expanded community facilities.

== New mosque ==
Designed by AMRS Architectes, the new mosque is located at 178 rue d'illzach (also spelled as rue d’Alsace) and developed over three floors occupying an 11,000-square-metre (120,000 sq ft) site. In addition to the mosque, schools and education centers, and a funeral parlor, several businesses, including a supermarket, a hair salon, a swimming pool, and a spa with a gym, are located within the complex. The mosque has capacity for 2,300 worshipers, with two spacious prayer rooms, one for men that is 1,358 square metres (14,620 sq ft), and one for women that is 843 square metres (9,070 sq ft).

Construction works commenced in March 2010; were subsequently suspended from 2011 to 2014; recommenced in 2014 with expectations that the mosque would be completed by 2017. The mosque was completed in 2019. (Note: Although some sources in 2020 state that the mosque was "…under construction" and "…near the gigantic building site"; while another source in 2020 states that the mosque "…is complete with…".)

=== Costs and funding ===
The cost of the project increased exponentially over the years, and although no official figure is available, several sources assess that the Mosque al-Nour and the Centre al-Nour will cost between €9–to–11 million; whilst one source estimated that the mosque's construction cost was €27 million.

As France is a secular state, the construction of the mosque and cultural center relied entirely on donations from the Muslim community. L’Alsace quoted Nasser El Kady, AMAL Vice-president in charge of monitoring the construction works, as declaring that the project supporters collected over €8 million since 2009. Prominent supporters of the project included Yusuf al-Qaradawi. However, L’Alsace reported that approximately €5 million was donated by wealthy benefactors from abroad, primarily from Qatar and Kuwait. The Consortium Against Terrorist Finance registered that Qataris contributed about €2 million to the project through Qatar Charity, the largest non-government organisation in Qatar. Among Qatar Charity's worldwide activities is "Ghaith", an initiative launched in 2015 to "serve Islamic project worldwide" under the supervision of Qatari preacher, Ahmed Al Hammadi.

=== Project criticism and allegations ===
The Mosque al-Nour has faced criticism, mostly related to disputable profiles of its architectural plan and its cost. Some Muslim voices have condemned the "unnecessarily majestic" project which did not address the needs of the local Muslim community, in need of two or three smaller mosques integrated with the life of the local community the cost of which would not exceed €1 million.

The Communauté Francophone de Confession Musulmane (Francophone Community of Islamic Faith, abbreviated as CFCM) denounced the project as a "political" operation that allowed the Muslim Brotherhood to gain political leverage and a stronghold in Mulhouse. CFCM stated that the Mulhouse mayor sold AMAL the plot of land for the mosque and cultural centre for €240,000, and decided to grant the organization a subsidy of the same amount without consulting with other Muslim organizations in Mulhouse or with other organizations representing civic society. CFCM questioned the unilateral decision of Mulhouse authorities to make the Mosque al-Nour and the Centre al-Nour a private property owned by AMAL and indirectly by the UOIF. CFCM claimed that the mosque and cultural centre – and by extension the Muslim Brotherhood-affiliated AMAL - will benefit from taxpayers’ money, stating it was "unfair and dishonest.". In an opinion piece published by L’Opinion in 2013, French journalist Nathalie Segaune voiced concerns about the public support of the project and the mosque's connections with Yusuf al-Qaradawi, a well-known mufti whose strong ties to the Muslim Brotherhood and to extremist organizations. al-Qaradawi was denied visas to the United States in 1999, the United Kingdom in 2008, and France in 2012.

Additionally, Qatar Charity had a long track-record of controversial ties to extremist and terrorist organizations. The Consortium Against Terrorist Finance (CATF) described Qatar's efforts to fund mosques and cultural institutes across Europe and worldwide as part of the Gulf country's struggle to compete with Saudi Arabia in spreading Salafism and "claiming new territory."

== Gallery ==
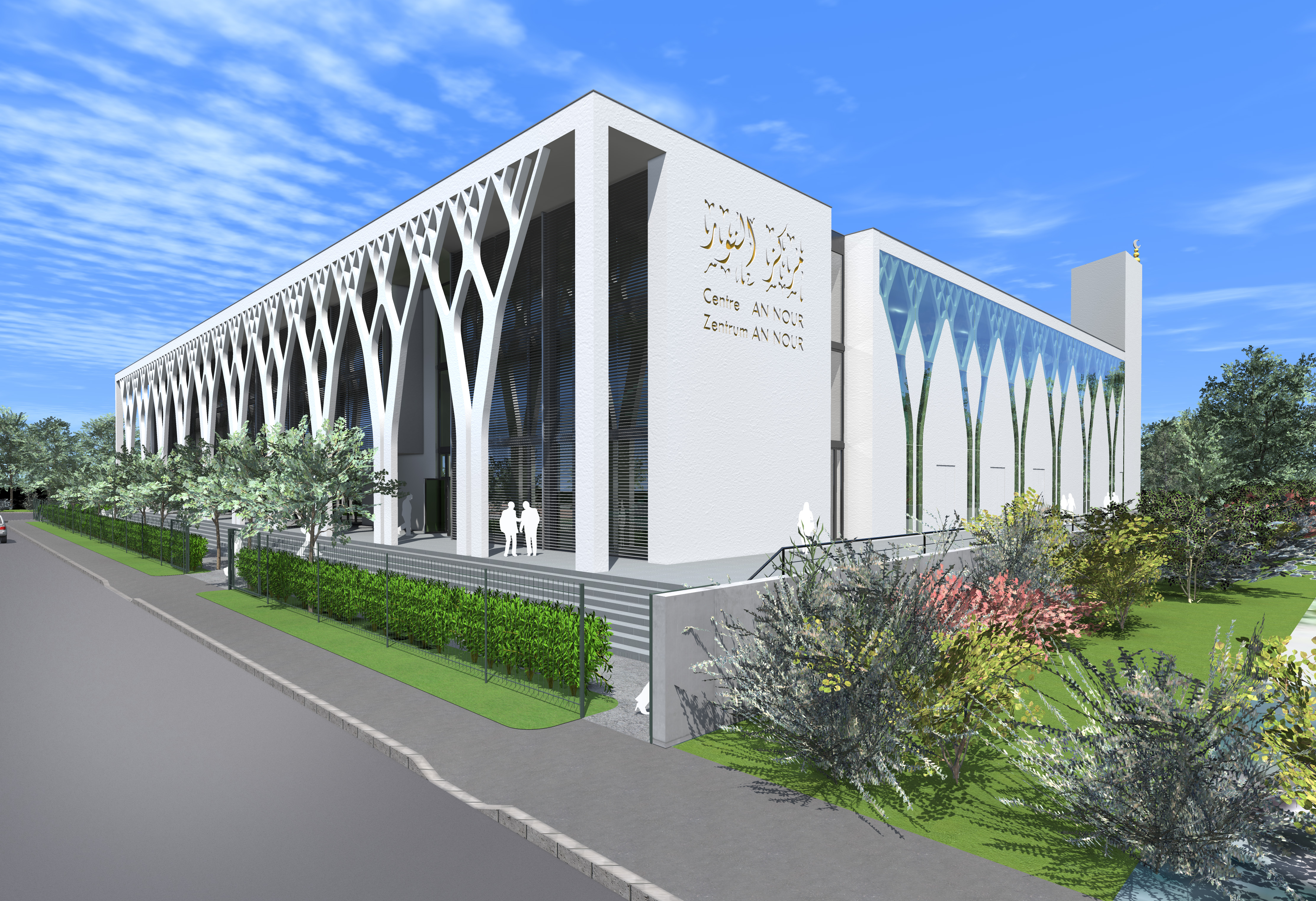
Artist's rendition of the building's exterior, 2011

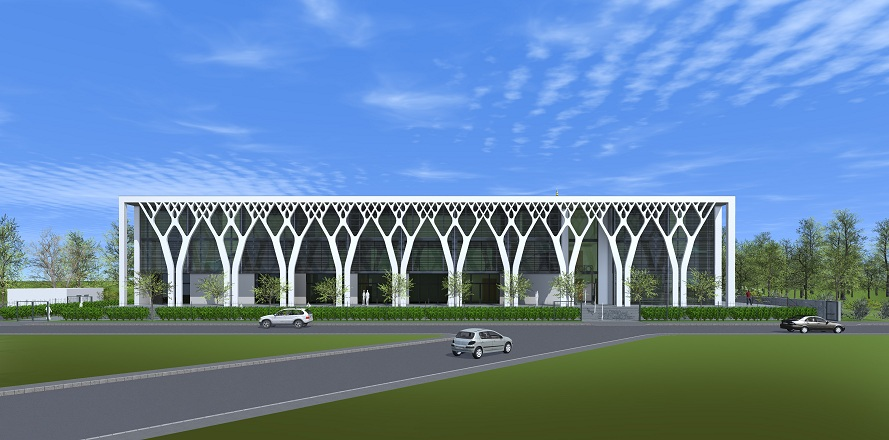
Artist's rendition of the building facade, 2011

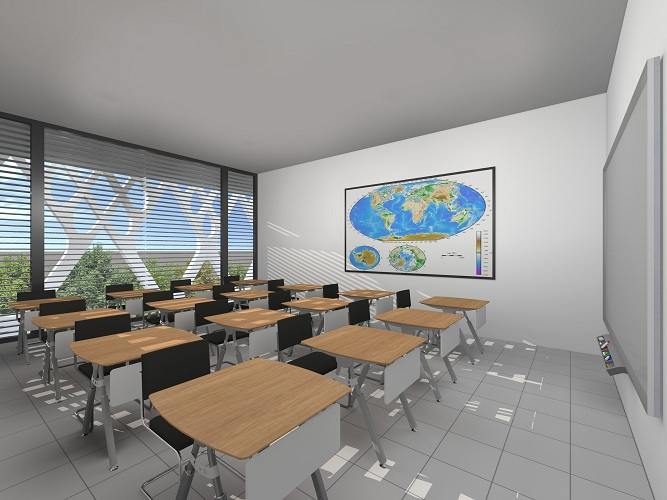
Artist's rendition of a classroom, 2011

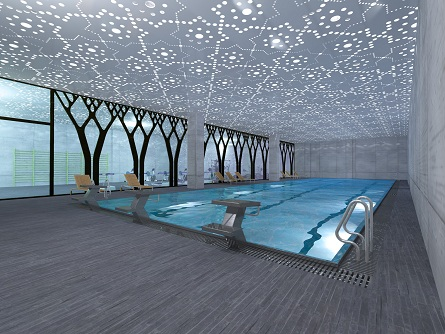
Artist's rendition of the swimming pool, 2011

== See also ==
- Islam in France
- List of mosques in France
- 2025 Mulhouse stabbing attack
