= Assalam Mosque =

Mosque in Nantes, France

- Mosquée Assalam de Nantes
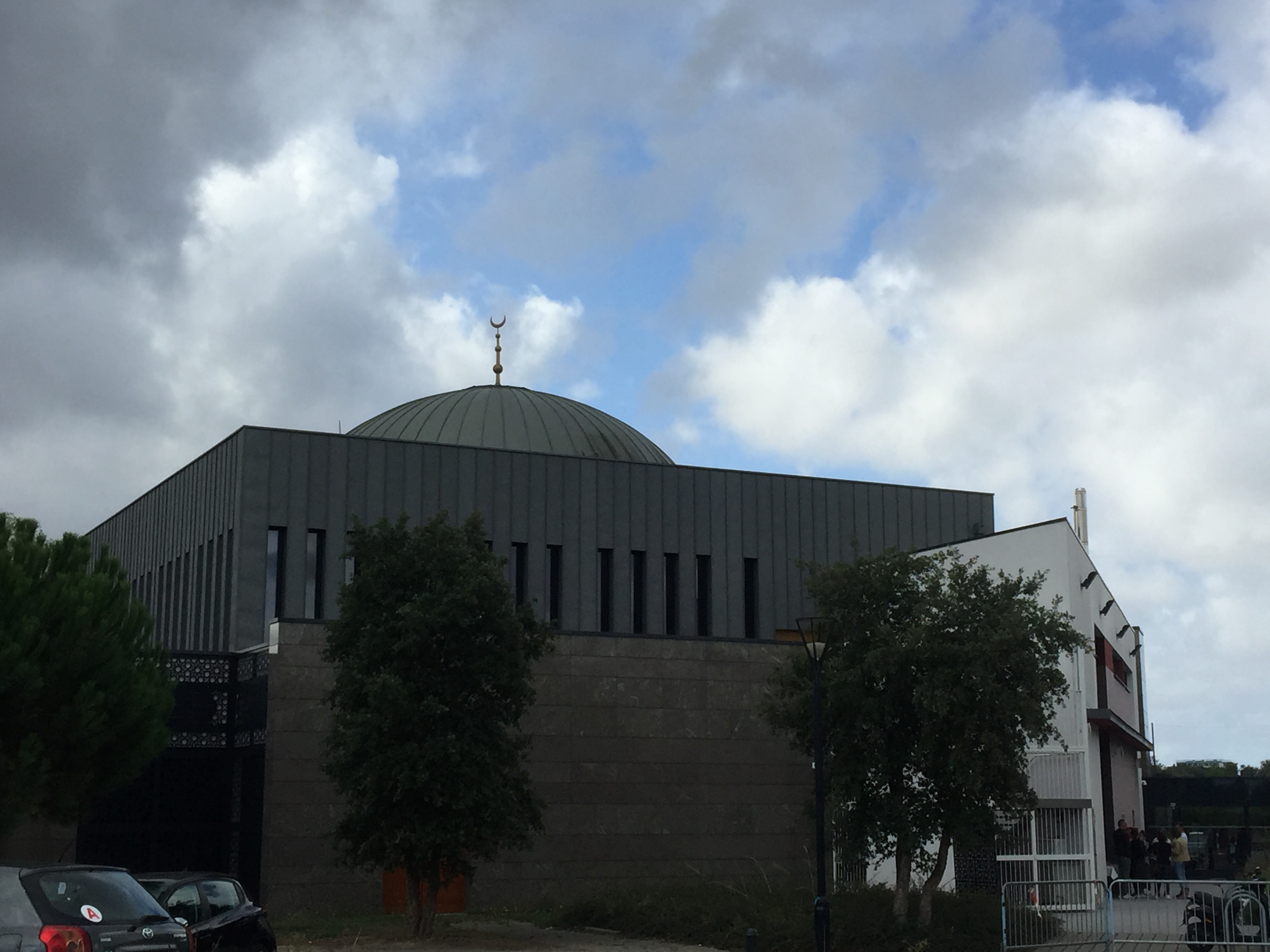

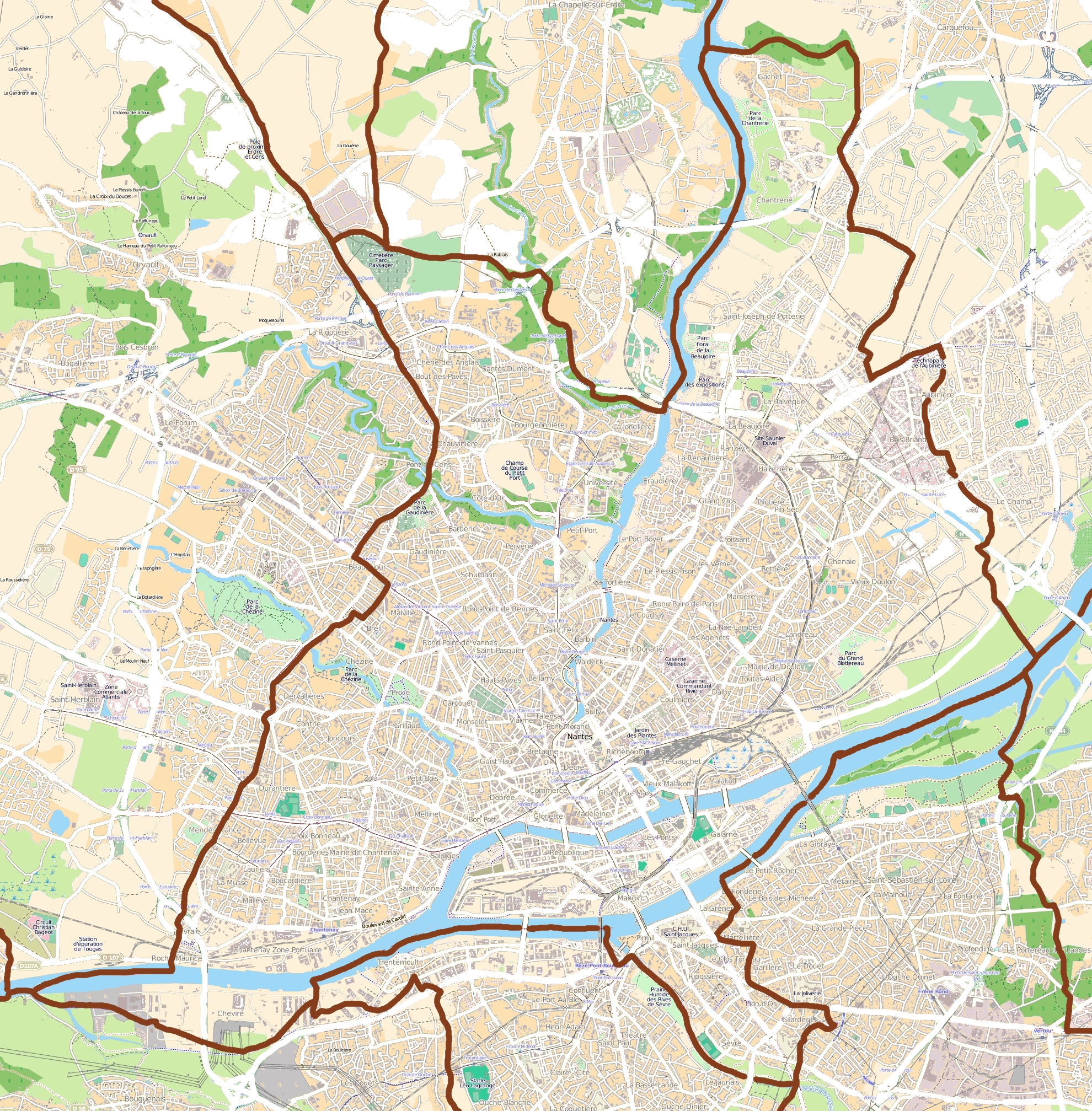
- Location of the mosque in Nantes

Religion
- Affiliation: Sunni Islam
- Ecclesiastical or organizational status: Mosque
- Status: Active

Location
- Location: Nantes
- Country: France
- Interactive map of Assalam Mosque
- Administration: Union of Islamic Organisations of France
- Coordinates: 47°13′10″N 1°31′06″W

Architecture
- Type: Mosque
- Groundbreaking: 2009
- Completed: 2012

Specifications
- Capacity: 1,500 worshipers
- Dome: 1
- Dome height (outer): 14 m (46 ft)
- Minaret: 1
- Minaret height: 17 m (56 ft)

Website
- mosquee-de-nantes.com (in French)

The Assalam Mosque (French: Mosquée Assalam de Nantes) is a mosque located in Nantes, France. Construction on the mosque began in 2009 and was completed in 2012. With capacity for 1,500 worshippers, it is the largest mosque in its region in France.

== Funding ==
The construction of the Assalam Mosque was largely funded by Bader Abdullah Al-Darwish, the Qatari chairman of Darwish Holding, who donated €4.4 million to complete the building. Bader Abdullah Al-Darwish is also a member of the Board and the Executive Committee of Qatar National Bank. The cultural center connected to the mosque, Al Darwish Abdullah Cultural Center, is named after the donor. Other funding came from France's Muslim community.

== Organization ==
The mosque is managed by the Union des Organisations Islamiques de France (UOIF) (English: Union of Islamic Organisations of France), an umbrella organization that represents about 250 Muslim organizations in France.

Qatar has been heavily involved in investments for mosques and cultural centers managed by the UOIF, including with the Assalam Mosque. This is one of many mosques throughout Europe whose construction was funded by Qatari interests. A 1905 law in France enforcing the separation of church and state has led to funding issues for the construction of places of worship in France, leading donors, such as the Qataris, to step in and finance this construction.

== Construction ==
Prior to the construction of Assalam mosque, a small church was given to the UOIF for the purpose of Muslim worship. After several years, this space was no longer large enough for the number of Muslims seeking a worship space in Nantes so a larger area of city land was made available for the construction of a larger mosque.

The building consists of two separate buildings, the Assalam mosque and the Al Darwish Abdullah Cultural Center. The buildings are connected by a gallery and have a patio with fountains between them.

The prayer room can accommodate up to 1,500 people and has a mihrab which indicates the qibla (direction) of Mecca. The building features soft natural light to create a tranquil space for worshipers. The mosque's minaret is 17 metres (56 ft) high and the dome is 14 metres (46 ft) high.

== Controversy ==
Some controversy arose in regards to the construction of the mosque as some believed that the mosque was replacing a church in Nantes. This led to backlash and debate about whether the mosque was actually replacing Saint-Christophe chapel.

== See also ==
- Islam in France
- List of mosques in France
