= List of mosques in France =

This is a list of mosques in France.

As of 2015, there were approximately 2,300 mosques in France with a further 200 to 250 planned.

It is difficult to say when the first mosque in France was built. There is archaeological evidence of a Christian basilica being converted into a mosque in 719, in Narbonne. The Tsingoni Mosque in the overseas department of Mayotte was built in 1538.

The Mosque of the Bois de Vincennes was built in 1916 for temporary use during World War I, and disaffected in 1919. The Grand Mosque of Paris opened in 1926 retains iconic status and is one of the largest standing mosques in France.

== List by department ==
The following mosques are located in France, sorted by department, with the department code.

=== Ain (01) ===
Name	City	Image	Year (CE)	Notes
Mosquée Ettakoua de Bourg-en-Bresse	Bourg-en-Bresse			
Mosquée de Miribel	Miribel			
Mosquée Arrahma d'Oyonnax	Oyonnax			

=== Aisne (02) ===
Name	City	Image	Year (CE)	Notes
Mosquée Annour de Laon	Laon			
Mosquée de Saint-Quentin	Saint-Quentin			
Mosquée de Soissons	Soissons			

=== Allier (03) ===
Name	City	Image	Year (CE)	Notes
Mosquée Turque de Vichy	Vichy			
Mosquée El Hijra de Vichy	Vichy			

=== Alpes-Maritimes (06) ===
Name	City	Image	Year (CE)	Notes
Mosquée de Cagnes-sur-Mer	Cagnes-sur-Mer			
Mosquée Iqraa de Cannes	Cannes			
Mosquée de Nice	Nice			
Mosquée Er-Rahma de Nice	Nice			

=== Ardèche (07) ===
Name	City	Image	Year (CE)	Notes
Mosquée Azitoun d'Aubenas	Aubenas			

=== Aube (10) ===
Name	City	Image	Year (CE)	Notes
Mosquée El Houda de Bar-sur-Seine	Bar-sur-Seine			
Mosquée Mosaab Bni Omair de la Chapelle-Saint-Luc	La Chapelle-Saint-Luc			
Mosquée Hamza de Troyes	Troyes			
Mosquée Ali de Troyes	Troyes			
Mosquée Abou Bakr de Troyes	Troyes			

=== Aude (11) ===
Name	City	Image	Year (CE)	Notes
Mosquée de Carcassonne	Carcassonne			

=== Bas-Rhin (67) ===
Name	City	Image	Year (CE)	Notes
Mahdi Mosque	Hurtigheim		2019	Affiliated with Ahmadiyya Islam.
Great Strasbourg Mosque	Strasbourg		2012	
Eyyub Sultan Mosque	Strasbourg			As of November 2025, the mosque was under construction.

=== Bouches-du-Rhône (13) ===
Name	City	Image	Year (CE)	Notes
Mosquée d'Arles	Arles			
El-Badr Mosque	Marseille		c. 2020	Priro to 2016, the building was used as a synagogue.
Mosquée Khalid Ibn Al Walid	Marseille			
Grande Mosquée de Marseille	Marseille		2011	

=== Calvados (14) ===
Name	City	Image	Year (CE)	Notes
Mosquée Annour d'Hérouville-Saint-Clair	Hérouville-Saint-Clair			

=== Charente (16) ===
Name	City	Image	Year (CE)	Notes
Mosquée d'Angoulême	Angoulême			
Mosquée Ennour de Soyaux	Soyaux			

=== Charente-Maritime (17) ===
Name	City	Image	Year (CE)	Notes
Mosquée de la Rochelle	La Rochelle			

=== Cher (18) ===
Name	City	Image	Year (CE)	Notes
Mosquée Al Fath de Bourges	Bourges			
Mosquée de Bourges	Bourges			

=== Corse-du-Sud (2A) ===
Name	City	Image	Year (CE)	Notes
Mosquée D'Ajaccio	Ajaccio			

=== Côte-d'Or (21) ===
Name	City	Image	Year (CE)	Notes
Mosquée Er-Rahma de Chenôve	Chenôve			
Mosquée El-Imân de Dijon	Dijon			
Mosquée En-Nour de Dijon	Dijon			
Mosquée Fraternité de Quetigny	Quetigny			

=== Doubs (25) ===
Name	City	Image	Year (CE)	Notes
Mosquée Sounna de Besançon	Besançon		2000	
Mosquée de Fontaine-Écu	Besançon		2009	
Al-Fath mosque	Besançon–Planoise		2008	

=== Drôme (26) ===
Name	City	Image	Year (CE)	Notes
Mosquée de Valence	Valence			

=== Essonne (91) ===
Name	City	Image	Year (CE)	Notes
Mosquée de Brétigny-sur-Orge	Brétigny-sur-Orge			
Mosquée de Courcouronnes	Courcouronnes			
Mosquée Hamza d'Epinay	Épinay-sous-Sénart			
Grand Mosque of Évry	Évry		1995	
Mosquée de Grigny	Grigny			
Mosquée de Longjumeau	Longjumeau			
Mosquée de Massy	Massy			
Mosquée de Ris-Orangis	Ris-Orangis			
Mosquée de Vigneux-sur-Seine	Vigneux-sur-Seine			

=== Eure (27) ===
Name	City	Image	Year (CE)	Notes
Mosquée Al Fathou d'Évreux	Évreux			
Mosquée Essalam de Gaillon	Gaillon			
Mosquée de Louviers	Louviers			

=== Eure-et-Loir (28) ===
Name	City	Image	Year (CE)	Notes
Mosquée Assalama de Châteaudun	Châteaudun			
Mosquée Assounah de Dreux	Dreux			
Mosquée Arahma de Dreux	Dreux			

=== Gard (30) ===
Name	City	Image	Year (CE)	Notes
Mosquée de Beaucaire	Beaucaire			
Mosquée Al-Rahma de Nîmes	Nîmes			
Mosquée de Nîmes	Nîmes			

=== Gironde (33) ===
Name	City	Image	Year (CE)	Notes
Mosquée Nour el-Mohammadi	Bordeaux			
Mosquée El Houda de Bordeaux	Bordeaux			
Mosquée El Fath de Bordeaux	Bordeaux			
Mosquée de Langon	Langon		1904	

=== Haut-Rhin (68) ===
Name	City	Image	Year (CE)	Notes
Mosquée Annassiha de Colmar	Colmar			
Mosquée Ali Ibn Abi Taleb d'Illzach	Illzach			
Mosquée Bilal de Mulhouse	Mulhouse			
Mosque al-Nour	Mulhouse		2019	A mosque and Islamic cultural center; believed to be completed; with capacity for 2,300 worshippers, it is claimed to be the largest mosque in Europe.
Mosquée Annasr de Mulhouse	Mulhouse			
Mosquée Turque de Mulhouse	Mulhouse			
Mosquée El Fath de Saint-Dizier	Saint-Dizier			
Mosquée AL Hijra de Thann	Thann			

=== Haute-Garonne (31) ===
Name	City	Image	Year (CE)	Notes
Mosquée du Mirail	Toulouse		2009	
Great Mosque of Toulouse	Toulouse		2018	Capacity of 3,000 worshippers.
Mosquée Rahma	Toulouse			

=== Haute-Loire (43) ===
Name	City	Image	Year (CE)	Notes
Masjid Ar Rahma du Puy-en-Velay	Le Puy-en-Velay			
Masjid Al Karim du Puy-en-Velay	Le Puy-en-Velay			

=== Haute-Marne (52) ===
Name	City	Image	Year (CE)	Notes
Mosquée de Chaumont	Chaumont			

=== Haute-Vienne (87) ===
Name	City	Image	Year (CE)	Notes
Mosquée de Limoges	Limoges			

=== Hautes-Alpes (05) ===
Name	City	Image	Year (CE)	Notes
Mosquée de Briançon	Briançon			

=== Hauts-de-Seine (92) ===
Name	City	Image	Year (CE)	Notes
Mosquée des Baconnets	Antony			
Mosquée Omar Ibn Khattab d'Antony	Antony			
Mosquée Al Hida d'Asnières	Asnières			
Mosquée d'Asnières-sur-Seine	Asnières			
Mosquée de Bagneux	Bagneux			
Mosquée Badr de Boulogne-Billancourt	Boulogne-Billancourt			
Mosquée de Clamart	Clamart			
Mosquée Ennour de Clichy	Clichy			
Mosquée Mohamed V de Colombes	Colombes			
Mosquée de Gennevilliers	Gennevilliers			
Mosquée Ennour de Gennevilliers	Gennevilliers			
Mosquée Grésillons de Gennevilliers	Gennevilliers			
Mosquée Safa de Gennevilliers	Gennevilliers			
Mosquée Essalam de Gennevilliers	Gennevilliers			
Mosquée de Levallois-Perret	Levallois-Perret			
Mosquée El Emir Abdelkader	Nanterre			
Mosquée Okba Ibn Nafae	Nanterre			
Mosquée Rahma de Nanterre	Nanterre			
Mosquée de Puteaux	Puteaux			
Mosquée Salam	Suresnes			
Mosquée de Villeneuve-la-Garenne	Villeneuve-la-Garenne		2015	Sound file for image.

=== Hérault (34) ===
Name	City	Image	Year (CE)	Notes
Mosquée Turque de Béziers	Béziers			
Mosquée de Béziers	Béziers			
Mosquée de Lunel	Lunel		2007	
Mosquée El Baraka de Lunel	Lunel			
Ibn Sina Mosque	Montpellier		c. 1990s	Some controversy regarding leadership of the mosque.

=== Ille-et-Vilaine (35) ===
Name	City	Image	Year (CE)	Notes
Mosquée Ennour de Rennes	Rennes			
Mosquée Turque de Rennes	Rennes			
Mosquée At-Taqwa	Rennes			

=== Indre-et-Loire (37) ===
Name	City	Image	Year (CE)	Notes
Mosquée Essalam de Tours	Tours			
Mosquée El Fath de Tours	Tours			

=== Isère (38) ===
Name	City	Image	Year (CE)	Notes
Mosquée Al Fathou de Grenoble	Grenoble			
Mosquée Abou Bakr de Grenoble	Grenoble			
Mosquée Omar ibn Al Khattab	Saint-Martin-d'Hères		2015	
Mosquée Masjid El Houda	Saint-Martin-le-Vinoux		2012	

=== Landes (40) ===
Name	City	Image	Year (CE)	Notes
Mosquée Errahma de Mont-de-Marsan	Mont-de-Marsan			

=== Loir-et-Cher (41) ===
Name	City	Image	Year (CE)	Notes
Mosquée Turque de Vendôme	Vendôme			

=== Loire (42) ===
Name	City	Image	Year (CE)	Notes
Mosquée Rahman de Saint-Étienne	Saint-Étienne			

=== Loire-Atlantique (44) ===
Name	City	Image	Year (CE)	Notes
Assalam Mosque	Nantes		2012	Capacity for 1,500 worshippers.
Mosquée Arrahma de Nantes	Nantes		2009	
Mosquée El Forqan de Nantes	Nantes		2014	
Mosquée Osmanli de Nantes	Nantes		2010	
Mosquée Turque de Nantes	Nantes		2009	

=== Loiret (45) ===
Name	City	Image	Year (CE)	Notes
Mosquée Assounah d'Orléans	Orléans			
Mosquée de Pithiviers	Pithiviers			

=== Lot-et-Garonne (47) ===
Name	City	Image	Year (CE)	Notes
Mosquée d'Agen	Agen			

=== Maine-et-Loire (49) ===
Name	City	Image	Year (CE)	Notes
Mosquée Turque Akşemsettin d'Angers	Angers			
Mosquée Cite Breton de Cholet	Cholet			
Mosquée Cite de Banneway de Cholet	Cholet			
Mosquée de Trelazé	Trélazé			

=== Manche (50) ===
Name	City	Image	Year (CE)	Notes
Mosquée Turque de Cherbourg	Cherbourg			
Mosquée Omar de Cherbourg	Cherbourg			
Mosquée de Cherbourg	Cherbourg			

=== Marne (51) ===
Name	City	Image	Year (CE)	Notes
Mosquée de Châlons-sur-Marne	Châlons-sur-Marne			
Mosquée d'Épernay	Épernay			
Mosquée Turque de Reims	Reims			
Mosquée A.C.I. de Reims	Reims			

=== Mayenne (53) ===
Name	City	Image	Year (CE)	Notes
Mosquée Arrahman de Laval	Laval			

=== Mayotte (976) ===
Name	City	Image	Year (CE)	Notes
Tsingoni Mosque	Tsingoni		1588	Exact age is disputed; a French historical monument.

=== Meurthe-et-Moselle (54) ===
Name	City	Image	Year (CE)	Notes
Mosquée de Longwy	Longwy			
Mosquée Arrahma de Nancy	Nancy			
Mosquée El Radiri de Nancy	Nancy			
Mosquée Essalam de Pont-à-Mousson	Pont-à-Mousson			
Mosquée de Toul	Toul			

=== Meuse (55) ===
Name	City	Image	Year (CE)	Notes
Mosquée de Bar-le-Duc	Bar-le-Duc			
Mosquée Arrahma de Ligny-en-Barrois	Ligny-en-Barrois			

=== Morbihan (56) ===
Name	City	Image	Year (CE)	Notes
Mosquée de Lorient	Lorient			

=== Moselle (57) ===
Name	City	Image	Year (CE)	Notes
Mosquée des Mines d'Asturies	Asturies			
Mosquée Al Khadir de Fameck	Fameck			
Mosquée El-Hijra	Farébersviller			
Mosquée de Forbach	Forbach			
Mosquée de Metz	Metz			
Mosquée de Moyeuvre	Moyeuvre-Grande			
Mosquée de Thionville	Thionville			
Mosquée Assahaba d'Uckange	Uckange			

=== Nièvre (58) ===
Name	City	Image	Year (CE)	Notes
Mosquée du Pardon de Nevers	Nevers			
Mosquée de Nevers	Nevers			
Mosquée de Nevers	Nevers			

=== Nord (59) ===
Name	City	Image	Year (CE)	Notes
Mosquée Assounah de Dunkerque	Dunkerque			
Mosquée Dole de Dunkerque	Dunkerque			
Mosquée El Fateh de Dunkerque	Dunkerque			
Mosquée Abou Dharr de Dunkerque	Dunkerque			
Mosquée Salam de Grande-Synthe	Grande-Synthe			
Masjid Al Imaan de Lille	Lille			
Masjid Al Houda de Lille	Lille			
Masjid Al Furqaan de Lille	Lille			
Masjid Badr de Lille	Lille			
Mosquée Annour de Lille	Lille			
Mosquée de Lille	Lille			
Mosquée El Feth de Louvroil	Louvroil			
Mosquée de Maubeuge	Maubeuge			
Mosquée Al Wiqaf de Mons-en-Barœul	Mons-en-Barœul			
Mosquée Da'wa de Roubaix	Roubaix			
Mosquée Abou Bakr de Roubaix	Roubaix		2014	
Bilal Mosque	Roubaix		2012	
Mosquée de Roubaix	Roubaix		2012	
Mosquée Sunna de Roubaix	Roubaix			
Mosquée Ibn Tymiyya de Tourcoing	Tourcoing			
Mosquée de Wallers	Wallers			
Grande Mosquée de Villeneuve-d'Ascq	Villeneuve-d'Ascq		2011	

=== Oise (60) ===
Name	City	Image	Year (CE)	Notes
Mosquée Bilal de Beauvais	Beauvais			
Mosquée Esalam de Creil	Creil			
Mosquée Abou Bakr de Creil	Creil			
Mosquée El Badr de Noyon	Noyon			

=== Paris (75) ===
Name	Arrond.	Image	Year (CE)	Notes
Grand Mosque of Paris	5th (V^{e})		1926	
Mosquée El Fatih	10th (X^{e})			
Mosquée Turque, 10e	10th (X^{e})			
Mosquée Ali ben abi Taleb	10th (X^{e})			
Mosquée Abou Ayoub Al Ansari	11th (XI^{e})			
Mosquée Turque, 11e	11th (XI^{e})			
Mosquée Abou Baker Assiddiq	11th (XI^{e})			
Mosquée Omar Ibn Khattab	11th (XI^{e})			
Mosquée Attaqwa	11th (XI^{e})			
Mosquée Alhouda	11th (XI^{e})			
Mosquée Attawbah	12th (XI^{e})			
Mosque of the Bois de Vincennes	12th (XI^{e})		1916	Abandoned in 1920, the mosque was demolished in 1926, around the time when the Grand Mosque of Paris was inaugurated.
Mosquée de la Maison de Tunisie	14th (XIV^{e})			
Mosquée de la maison du Maroc	14th (XIV^{e})			
Mosquée de la Ligue Islamique Mondiale	15th (XV^{e})			
Mosquée AbdelMajid	18th (XVIII^{e})			
Mosquée Khalid Ibn El Walid	18th (XVIII^{e})			
Mosquée Al Fath	18th (XVIII^{e})			
Mosquée des Comoriens	20th (XX^{e})			
Mosquée du 20e arrondissement	20th (XX^{e})			
Mosquée Anwar El-Madina	20th (XX^{e})			

=== Pas-de-Calais (62) ===
Name	City	Image	Year (CE)	Notes
Grande Mosquée d'Arras	Arras			
Mosquée de la république d'Avion	Avion			
Mosquée d'Avion-Lens	Avion			
Mosquée de Lens	Lens			
Mosquée d'Oignies	Oignies			
Mosquée de Valenciennes	Valenciennes			

=== Puy-de-Dôme (63) ===
Name	City	Image	Year (CE)	Notes
Mosquée Etawba de Clermont-Ferrand	Clermont-Ferrand			
Grande Mosquée de Clermont-Ferrand	Clermont-Ferrand			
Mosquée Alwahda de Clermont-Ferrand	Clermont-Ferrand			

=== Pyrénées-Atlantiques (64) ===
Name	City	Image	Year (CE)	Notes
Mosquée de Pau	Pau			

=== Pyrénées-Orientales (66) ===
Name	City	Image	Year (CE)	Notes
Mosquée Annour de Perpignan	Perpignan			

=== Réunion (974) ===
Name	City	Image	Year (CE)	Notes
Noor-e-Islam Mosque	Saint-Denis		1905	

=== Rhône (69) ===
Name	City	Image	Year (CE)	Notes
Mosquée de Belleville	Belleville-en-Beaujolais			
Mosquée Khaled ibn El Walid	Givors		2013	
Mosquée Mosaab ibn Omayer	Lyon (7^{e} arrondissement)			
Grand Mosque of Lyon	Lyon (8^{e} arrondissement)		1994	
Mosquée Et-Tawba	Lyon (9^{e} arrondissement)			
Mosquée Omar de Lyon	Lyon			
Mosquée de Rillieux-la-Pape	Rillieux-la-Pape			
Eyüp Sultan Mosque	Vénissieux		2013	
Mosquée Al-Rahma de Villeurbanne	Villeurbanne			
Uthman Mosque	Villeurbanne		2006	

=== Sarthe (72) ===
Name	City	Image	Year (CE)	Notes
Mosquée du Mans	Le Mans			

=== Seine-Maritime (76) ===
Name	City	Image	Year (CE)	Notes
Mosquée Annour d'Elbeuf	Elbeuf			
Mosquée de Bellevue	Le Havre			
Mosquée Al Kaoutar de Rouen	Rouen			

=== Seine-et-Marne (77) ===
Name	City	Image	Year (CE)	Notes
Mosquée Al Salam de Dammarie-les-Lys	Dammarie-les-Lys			
Mosquée Yumus Emre de Montereau	Montereau-Fault-Yonne			
Mosquée de Montereau	Montereau		2006	
Mosquée de Nangis	Nangis			
Mosquée de Nemours	Nemours			
Mosquée Rahma de Torcy	Torcy			
Masjid Othmane de Villeparisis	Villeparisis			

=== Seine-Saint-Denis (93) ===
Name	City	Image	Year (CE)	Notes
Mosquée Turque d'Aubervilliers	Aubervilliers			
Mosquée Salem d'Aulnay-sous-Bois	Aulnay-sous-Bois		2013	
Mosquée de Bagnolet	Bagnolet		2013	
Mosquée Tawhid de Blanc-Mesnil	Blanc-Mesnil			
Mosquée de Blanc-Mesnil	Blanc-Mesnil			
Mosquée al Anssar de Bondy	Bondy			
Mosquée de Clichy-sous-Bois	Clichy-sous-Bois			
Mosquée Billal de Clichy-sous-Bois	Clichy-sous-Bois			
Mosquée Ennour de Drancy	Drancy			
Mosquée Sidna Nouh de Dugny	Dugny			
Mosquée Ibrahim de la Courneuve	La Courneuve			
Mosquée de la Courneuve	La Courneuve			
Mosquée Nour de Montfermeil	Montfermeil			
Mosquée Turque de Montfermeil	Montfermeil			
Mosquée Al Fourqane de Montfermeil	Montfermeil			
Mosquée Ben Youssef de Montfermeil	Montfermeil			
Mosquée de Montreuil	Montreuil			
Mosquée El-Islah de Montreuil	Montreuil			
Mosquée Al Oumma de Montreuil	Montreuil			
Mosquée de Neuilly-Plaisance	Neuilly-Plaisance			
Mosquée Ettakwa de Noisy-le-Grand	Noisy-le-Grand			
Mosquée de Noisy-le-Grand	Noisy-le-Grand			
Mosquée Al Fath de Noisy-le-Sec	Noisy-le-Grand			
Mosquée Hamza de Pantin	Pantin			
Mosquée Turque de Pantin	Pantin			
Mosquée de l'Association pour la Fraternité et la Tolérance	Romainville			
Mosquée de l'A.M.R.	Rosny-sous-Bois			
Grand Mosque of Imam Malik	Saint-Denis		2019	
Mosquée Errahma de Saint-Denis	Saint-Denis			
Mosquée Bilal de Saint-Denis	Saint-Denis			
Mosquée Tawhid de Saint-Denis	Saint-Denis			
Mosquée de Saint-Gratien	Saint-Gratien			
Mosquée Anaad de Saint-Ouen	Saint-Ouen			
Mosquée Essalame de Saint-Ouen	Saint-Ouen			
Grande Mosquée de Saint-Ouen-sur-Seine	Saint-Ouen			Also known as Mosquée Al Hashimi.
Mosquée de Sevran	Sevran			
Mosquée Attawba de Stains	Stains			
Grande Mosquée de Tremblay-en-France - UMTEF	Tremblay-en-France			
Mosquée de Villepinte	Villepinte			
Al Madrassah	Villepinte			

=== Somme (80) ===
Name	City	Image	Year (CE)	Notes
Mosquée Al Badr d'Amiens	Amiens			
Mosquée Al Mohsinine d'Amiens	Amiens		2005	
Mosquée Nour d'Amiens	Amiens			
Mosquée et Centre Culturel Islamique d'Amiens	Amiens			
Mosquée El Feth d'Amiens	Amiens			

=== Tarn (81) ===
Name	City	Image	Year (CE)	Notes
The Mosque of Castres	Castres			

=== Val-de-Marne (94) ===
Name	City	Image	Year (CE)	Notes
Masjid Al-Fatah de Cachan	Cachan			
Mosquée Abou Horaira de Créteil	Créteil			
Sahaba Mosque	Créteil		2008	
Mosquée Essalam de Fontenay-sous-Bois	Fontenay-sous-Bois			
Mosquée Al Islah de Villiers-sur-Seine	Villiers-sur-Seine			
Mosquée de Vitry	Vitry-sur-Seine			

=== Val-d'Oise (95) ===
Name	City	Image	Year (CE)	Notes
Mosquée d'Argenteuil	Argenteuil			
Institut Islamique de France Al Ihsan	Argenteuil			
Grande Mosquée de Cergy	Cergy		2012	
Mosquée El-Irshad de Garges-lès-Gonesse	Garges-lès-Gonesse			
Mosquée Hamza de Garges-lès-Gonesse	Garges-lès-Gonesse			
Mosquée la Muette de Garges-lès-Gonesse	Garges-lès-Gonesse			
Mosquée de Goussainville	Goussainville			
Mosquée Avicenne de Pontoise	Pontoise			
Moubarak Mosque	Saint-Prix		2008	
Mosquée du livre Essounah	Sarcelles			
Mosquée de Taverny	Taverny			

=== Var (83) ===
Name	City	Image	Year (CE)	Notes
Missiri Mosque	Fréjus		1930	A former French military community center in the Neo Sudano-Sahelian Islamic architectural style. Although the building's appearance evokes that of a mosque, its purpose and uses remained secular.
Mosquée El Fatah de Fréjus	Fréjus			
Mosquée de Toulon	Toulon			

=== Vaucluse (84) ===
Name	City	Image	Year (CE)	Notes
Mosquée De Sunna d'Avignon	Avignon			
Mosquée Oiseaux d'Avignon	Avignon			
Mosquée la Rocade d'Avignon	Avignon			
Mosquée de Carpentras	Carpentras			
Mosquée de Valréas	Valréas			

=== Vendée (85) ===
Name	City	Image	Year (CE)	Notes
Mosquée Al Hijra de la Roche-sur-Yon	La Roche-sur-Yon			

=== Vienne (86) ===
Name	City	Image	Year (CE)	Notes
Mosquée Châtellerault	Châtellerault			
Grande mosquée de Poitiers	Poitiers		2008	

=== Yonne (89) ===
Name	City	Image	Year (CE)	Notes
Mosquée d'Auxerre	Auxerre			

=== Yvelines (78) ===
Name	City	Image	Year (CE)	Notes
Mosquée de la Paix d'Achères	Achères		2020	
Mosquée-les-Vignes de Chanteloup	Chanteloup			
Othmane Ibn Affane Mosque	Mantes-la-Jolie		1981	
Grande Mosquée de Poissy	Poissy			
Mosquée de Sartrouville	Sartrouville			
Mosquée Erahma de Trappes	Trappes			
Mosquée de Versailles	Versailles			

== See also ==
- Islam in France
- List of mosques
- List of mosques in Europe
