= Great Mosque of Toulouse =

Mosque in Toulouse, Haute-Garonne, France

- Grande Mosquée de Toulouse

- Location of the mosque in Haute-Garonne

Religion
- Affiliation: Islam
- Ecclesiastical or organizational status: Mosque
- Status: Active

Location
- Location: Toulouse, Haute-Garonne
- Country: France
- Interactive map of Great Mosque of Toulouse
- Coordinates: 43°34′29″N 1°26′19″E

Architecture
- Architect: Christian Barthe
- Type: Mosque
- Completed: 2018
- Construction cost: €6 million

Specifications
- Capacity: 3,000 worshippers
- Dome: 1
- Minaret: 1

The Great Mosque of Toulouse (French: Grande Mosquée de Toulouse) is a mosque in the city of Toulouse, France It opened in 2018. The mosque is located in the Empalot neighbourhood in the south of the city and has a capacity of 3,000 worshipers.

== Overview ==
Fountain in the mosque

The funds for the €6 million project came mainly from a 13-year campaign by the nearby Al-Nour Mosque, itself established in 1989. Additions came from the French state, Algeria (€213,000) and Kuwait (€131,000). The imam, Mohamed Tataï, turned down donations from Libyan leader Muammar Gaddafi in 2006 and 2007.

The building has three prayer halls, one of which is reserved for women, and a Quranic school. It is decorated with Tunisian marble, rugs and doors from Turkey, Egyptian chandeliers and Moroccan stucco. On the exterior, there is a gilded dome and a minaret. The architect was Christian Barthe.

== Controversy ==
In April 2022, Mohamed Tataïat, the mosque's imam, was expelled to Algeria after being sentenced to four months of suspended imprisonment for inciting hate against Jews in a 2017 sermon. The court justified the decision stating Tataïat's comments constituted a deliberate provocation to discrimination, hatred, and violence against Jews and had conspicuous resonance and intensity following Hamas' October 7 attacks against Israel.

== See also ==
- Islam in France
- List of mosques in France
