= Ibn Sina Mosque =

Mosque in Montpellier, France

- Mosquée Ibn Sina
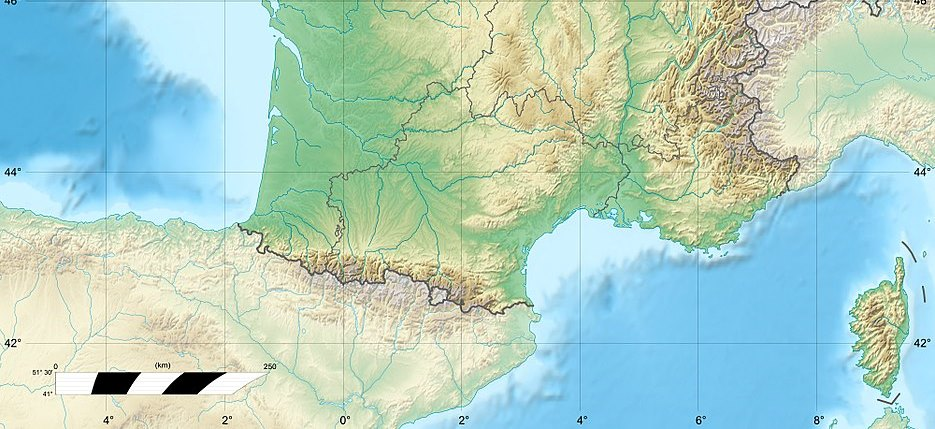
- Location of the mosque in the South of France

Religion
- Affiliation: Sunni Islam
- Ecclesiastical or organizational status: Mosque
- Leadership: Ahmed Keddari (imam)
- Status: Active

Location
- Location: Montpellier, Hérault
- Country: France
- Interactive map of Ibn Sina Mosque
- Administration: Association for the Knowledge of Arab Culture
- Coordinates: 43°36′50″N 3°50′20″E

Architecture
- Type: Mosque
- Capacity: 2,000 worshipers

The Ibn Sina Mosque (French: Mosquée Ibn Sina), also known as la mosque Avicenne and the Grande Mosquée Ibn Sina, named in honour of Avicenne, is a mosque located in the Petit Bard neighborhood of Montpellier, in the department of Hérault, in the South of France. The mosque is managed and run by a group of Algerian nationals from the Association for the Knowledge of Arab Culture.

== Description ==
The Ibn Sina Mosque is the largest mosque in Montpellier with a capacity of 2,000 worshipers, with another 1,000 worshipers able to be accommodated in the adjacent sahn. The mosque draws a mix of believers from the deeply traditional to the radical.

Prayers are held in the mosque five times each day in addition to sermons on Friday. The imam of the mosque is Ahmed Keddari. The official language of the mosque is fusha and no sermons are held in French. There is a separate room for women in the mosque and Arabic courses are organized by the teaching staff.

== Controversies ==
The management, since its opening over 20 years ago, has been in the hands of a father-and-son duo who have served as successive presidents. In 2013, the mosque leaders signed a 50-year lease of a former multi-purpose hall owned by the local city council.

In 2014, members of the Ibn Sina Mosque protested against the mosque president, Tahar Nedromi, along with the association managing the mosque, claiming that there were suspicious activities occurring at the mosque. Members claimed that the mosque leadership was a dictatorship. In February 2014, mosque members clashed when Nedromi was accused of Mafia-style administration and questionable financial management. Many mosque members were upset that the mosque had been under the authority and power of Khatir and Tahrir Nedromi – father and son, respectively – for over 20 years, while neither had been elected to the post by mosque members.

Anger from the community stemmed from the 50-year lease with the city, signed in 2013 by Nedromi, that included an unfair clause that €4 million be invested into city facilities through beautification projects, that did not significantly benefit Muslims. If the mosque did not meet the terms, the city could terminate the lease and recover the property. The lease stipulated that grants to the city council and the region must be paid every year and the members of the Ibn Sina Mosque were not consulted where their money was going. In addition to the problems with the lease, members of the mosque protested against Tahar Nedromi specifically, accusing him of faking and forging documents. Mosque members alleged that the president signed the lease on behalf of a board of directors that does not exist. An article was published in which a mosque member argued that, while their brothers and sisters were fighting for their rights in the Arab world, people in France had rights and therefore should not be subjected to the Arab dictatorship that the Nedromi family created inside Ibn Sina Mosque. Members expressed outrage that the Muslim community had no say in who runs the mosque. Members maintained that the president, Nedromi, only cared about maintaining his own power. Members further complained that the president and his father had no religions knowledge or skill but committed members of the mosque to accepting their rule without question. Members commenced legal proceedings against the president in 2017.

In July 2015, during Ramadan, tensions were again sparked within the mosque. Dozens of worshippers demonstrated, for the second time, after prayer, against Tahar Nedromi, the president. They accused Nedromi of corruption and financial mismanagement. Tensions escalated into a series of altercations between leadership and mosque members. During this time it was reported that the mosque imam had disappeared; although it was later reported that he had travelled to Algeria for Ramadan. Conservative members of the "Association of Citizens for Montpellier" soon joined the protest, arguing that the Muslims in Petit Bard created an atmosphere of poison around the mosque, and that suspicious behaviours were increasing in and around the mosque in recent years. They also argued that the president of Ibn Sina Mosque was involved in financial corruption. That same month, several families from Petit Bard, who were members of Ibn Sina Mosque, were arrested in conjunction with an investigation into the jihadists sector of Syria. In the first week of July 2015, members of the domestic surveillance and intelligence police conducted secret investigations into allegations of Ibn Sina Mosque members who planned to travel to Syria to fight with the jihadists. Several families in Petit Bard were arrested and taken to the regional directorate of domestic surveillance, where they were held in custody. Family members, including young children, had allegedly been radicalised inside the mosque according to information gathered by the police. Investigations interrupted the preparations for their departure to Syria.

== See also ==
- Islam in France
- List of mosques in France
