= Moubarak Mosque, Val-d'Oise =

Mosque in Saint-Prix, France

Moubarak Mosque
- Mosquée Moubarak de Saint-Prix
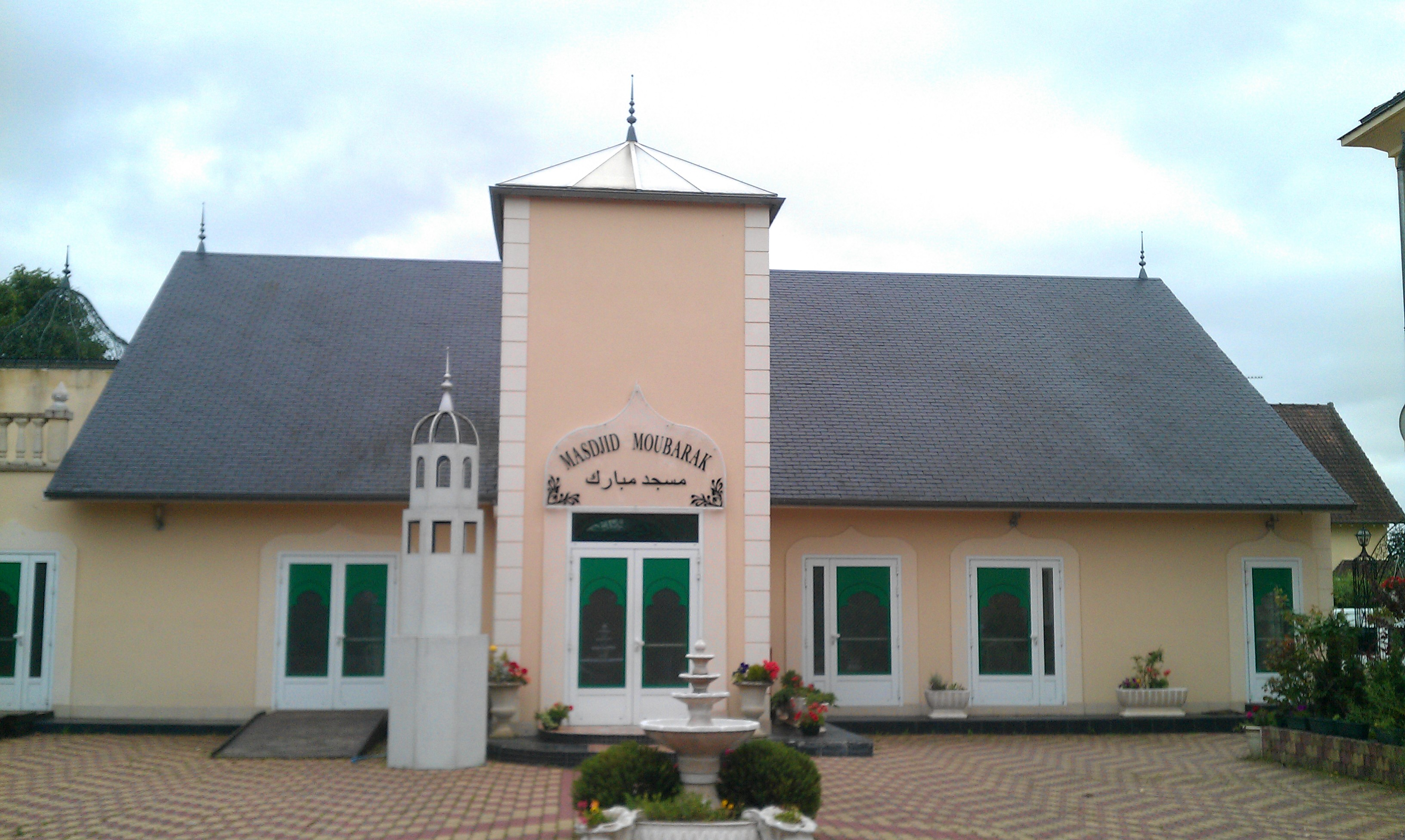

- Location within France

Religion
- Affiliation: Ahmadiyya Islam
- Ecclesiastical or organizational status: Mosque
- Status: Active

Location
- Location: Saint-Prix, Val-d'Oise
- Country: France
- Interactive map of Moubarak Mosque
- Coordinates: 49°00′42″N 2°15′30″E

Architecture
- Type: Mosque
- Completed: 2008

The Mubarak Mosque or Moubarak Mosque is an Ahmadi Muslim mosque located in the commune of Saint-Prix in the Val-d'Oise department in northern France. It is the first Ahmadiyya mosque in France.

== Inauguration ==
The mayor of Saint-Prix, Jean-Pierre Enjalbert, was at first against the idea of an Ahmadiyya mosque in his town, but later changed his mind and gave his approval. He said, "What reassured us is the fact we’ve got to know them through all these years, had time to observe them, see how they act. I came to many meetings, listened to what they had to say and learned what their message was."

The mosque was inaugurated by the Mirza Masroor Ahmad, the Head of the Ahmadiyya Muslim Community, on 10 October 2008.

== See also ==
- Ahmadiyya by country
- Islam in France
- List of mosques in France
