= Eyyub Sultan Mosque =

Mosque in Strasbourg, Grand Est, France

Eyyub Mosque
- Mosquée Eyyûb Sultan de Strasbourg
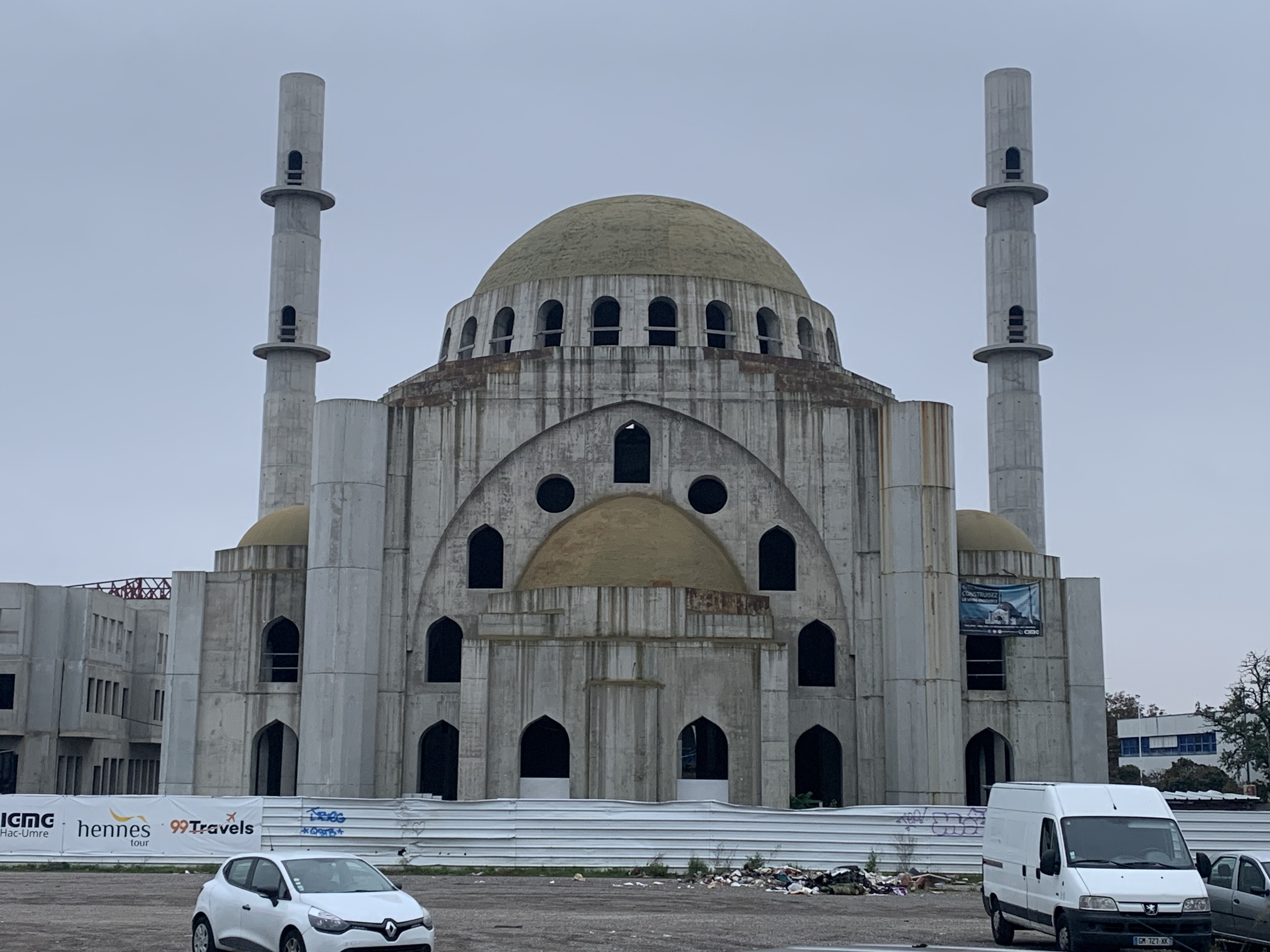
- Mosque under construction in October 2024

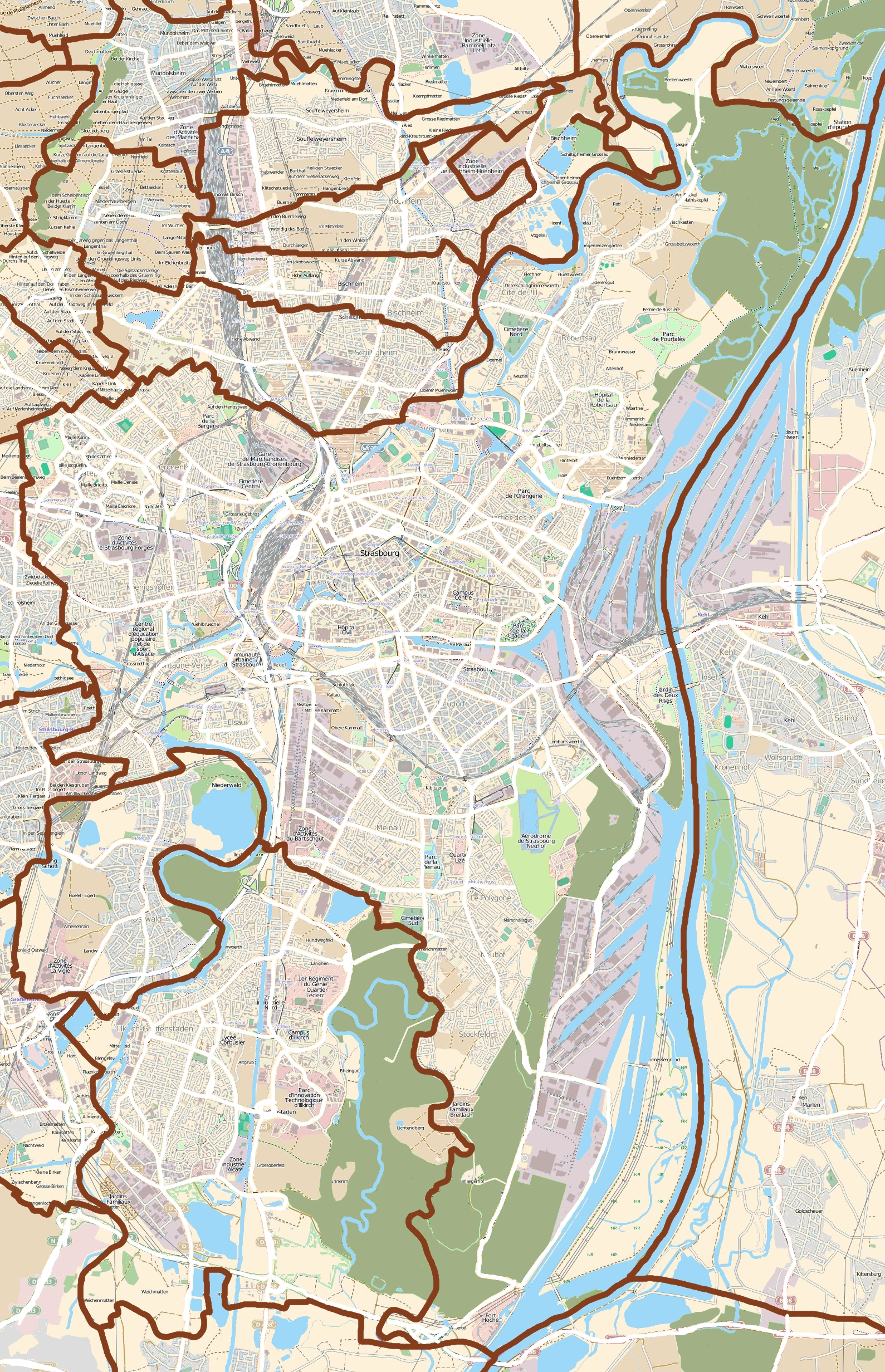
- Location within Strasbourg

Religion
- Affiliation: Islam
- Ecclesiastical or organisational status: Mosque
- Status: under construction

Location
- Location: Strasbourg, Grand Est, France
- Administration: Milli Görüs Islamic Confederation
- Coordinates: 48°33′44.0″N 7°44′40.2″E

Architecture
- Type: Mosque
- Groundbreaking: 2017
- Completed: 2027
- Construction cost: Euro25 million

Specifications
- Capacity: 2,500 worshippers (when completed)
- Dome: 1
- Minaret: 2
- Minaret height: 36 m (118 ft)
- Site area: 7,000 m^{2} (75,000 sq ft)

Website
- Official website

The Eyyub Sultan Mosque (French: Mosquée Eyyûb Sultan de Strasbourg) or Grand Mosque of Strasbourg is a mosque currently under construction in Strasbourg, Grand Est, France in which will be the largest mosque in Europe upon its completion.

== History ==
The construction of the mosque started in 2017. The construction cost of the building is EUR25 million. The mosque will be led by Millî Görüş Islamic Confederation.

== Architecture ==
The mosque is being built at a total area of 7,000 square metres (75,000 sq ft). The minarets are 36 metres (118 ft) high. The mosque will have a capacity of 2,500 worshippers indoor and another 2,500 on its adjacent sahn. When completed, it will be the largest mosque in Europe.

== Transportation ==
The mosque will be accessible within talking distance west of Krimmeri-Meinau station of SNCF.

== See also ==
- Islam in France
- List of mosques in France
