= Tours Congress (National Front) =

The Tours Congress was the 14th congress of the French National Front, which was held in Tours on January 15 and 16, 2011.

After 39 years of leadership, Jean-Marie Le Pen didn't run for his reelection. The aim of this congress was also to elect the members of the new Central Committee.

== The congress ==
- January 15, 2011
  - Beginning of the congress
  - Extrodirnary general assembly
  - Ordinary general assembly
  - Debates on the 2011 cantonal elections
  - Outgoing president Jean-Marie Le Pen's speech
  - Gala dinner
- January 16, 2011
  - Beginning of the 2nd day of congress
  - Announcement of the results (President and Central Committee)
  - Bruno Gollnisch's speech
  - National Front Youth's convention
  - Central Committee meeting
  - New FN President Marine Le Pen's speech
  - End of the congress

Outside the congress, several thousand people demonstrated against the National Front along with 25 left-wing associations, trade unions and parties.

== Internal campaign ==
On April 12, 2010, Jean-Marie Le Pen revealed he would leave office after the next Tours congress.

Marine Le Pen announced on several occasions her candidacy for president of the National Front against Bruno Gollnish. The 3 main French far-right newspapers Minute, Rivarol and Présent announced they would support Gollnish over Marine Le Pen as they are very hostile towards her.

On abortion, Bruno Gollnisch says he's totally against it. On the contrary, Marine Le Pen is in favor of abortion.

Unlike Marine Le Pen, Gollnish also wants to repeal the Civil solidarity pact;

However, both candidates are in favor of a referendum on death penalty and are strongly opposed to immigration.

62 year-old Gollnisch follows a very conservative political approach whereas Marine Le Pen wants to get away from far-right movements.

On January 4, 2011, Jean-Marie Le Pen announced he'd vote for his daughter, Marine Le Pen but wished Gollnisch all the best for the election.’

== Results ==
The FN members had until January 8, 2011, to vote. They could only vote by post. .

=== Presidency ===
Popular vote
Marine Le Pen	67.65%
Bruno Gollnish	32.35%
