= Boulevard Voltaire (website) =

French far-right news and opinion website

- Website type: News and opinion website
- Available in: French
- Founders: Robert Ménard, Emmanuelle Ménard, Dominique Jamet
- Editor: Gabrielle Cluzel
- Website: www.bvoltaire.fr
- Launched: October 2012; 13 years ago
- Current status: Active

Boulevard Voltaire is a French news and opinion website launched in October 2012 by the journalists Robert Ménard and Dominique Jamet. It is generally described as belonging to the French far right. The site describes itself as open to all currents of the conservative right.

Its founders have all since left the editorial board. Ménard departed in 2014 after being elected mayor of Béziers, Jamet in 2016, and Emmanuelle Ménard in 2017 after being elected to the National Assembly. Gabrielle Cluzel has been the editor-in-chief since 2017.

== History ==
Robert Ménard and Dominique Jamet launched Boulevard Voltaire in October 2012 as a news and debate platform. According to Jamet, the project aimed to give a platform to opinions not sanctioned by large press groups or political parties. The site was created without capital and relied at the time on around 30 unpaid columnists.

Ménard left the site in 2014 after he was elected mayor of Béziers with the support of the National Front. Jamet, who was the publication director, left in 2016. Ménard's wife, Emmanuelle Ménard, then served as editor. She was elected as a deputy for Hérault in June 2017 with National Front support and was succeeded as editor by Gabrielle Cluzel.

== Editorial line ==
The website's editorial line focuses on immigration, Christianophobia, "anti-white racism", and links between migrants and crime. Some of its contributors openly promote the Great Replacement conspiracy theory. Figures from the far right such as Jean-Yves Le Gallou, Alain Soral and Renaud Camus have appeared on the site.

A 2019 study of the French media space carried out by Sciences Po and the MIT Center for Civic Media for the Institut Montaigne placed Boulevard Voltaire in the "far right" sub-category of what it termed "satellite media", that is, outlets that cite all other media groups extensively but are almost never cited in return. An analysis of 52 million tweets placed the site in the same audience cluster as Fdesouche, Riposte Laïque, Valeurs actuelles, Polémia and RT France.

== Controversies ==
On 18 November 2014 the criminal court in Paris fined Jamet and the anti-Islam activist Christine Tasin for incitement to hatred against Muslims over a text by Tasin published on the site.

From 2017 the activist network Sleeping Giants campaigned to strip French far-right sites of advertising revenue by alerting brands whose advertisements appeared on them. Boulevard Voltaire and Breiz Atao were its first two French targets. Télérama reported in August 2017 that the site had lost close to 500 advertisers. In April 2019 Sleeping Giants stated that 915 advertisers had removed the site from their media plans.

Between 1 February and 24 April 2019, editor Gabrielle Cluzel appeared 43 times as a commentator on the news channels CNews and LCI, an average of once every two days. The media-criticism association Acrimed argued that the two channels were legitimising a far-right website by treating its editor as an ordinary member of the commentariat, noting that presenters neither described the site nor situated it politically for viewers.

== See also ==
- Far-right politics in France
- Fdesouche
- Riposte Laïque
