= Coûteaux =

Coûteaux, Couteaux is a French surname meaning 'knife'. Notable people with the surname include:

- André Couteaux (1925–1985), French author
- Paul-Marie Coûteaux (born 1956), French politician and author
