= National Council of European Resistance =

European far-right political organization

- Conseil national de la résistance européenne
- CNRE logo – a tricoloured cross of Lorraine
- Abbreviation: CNRE
- Named after: National Council of the Resistance
- Formation: 9 November 2017; 8 years ago
- Founders: Renaud Camus; Karim Ouchikh
- Founded at: Colombey-les-Deux-Églises
- Type: Political organization Nonprofit organization
- Registration no.: W751242801
- Legal status: Association Loi de 1901
- Purpose: Defence of European civilization
- Headquarters: Paris, France
- Field: Political advocacy
- Members: 32 Council members (2018)
- President: Renaud Camus
- Vice President: Karim Ouchikh
- Secretary General: vacant
- Key people: List of key members: Renaud Camus; Karim Ouchikh; Václav Klaus; Jean-Yves Le Gallou; Paul-Marie Coûteaux; Janice Atkinson; Christian Vanneste; Eliana Benador; Bernard Lugan; Christian Piquemal
- Affiliations: List of affiliations: Souveraineté, Identité et Libertés; Fidesz; Europe of Nations and Freedom; For Britain; Vlaams Belang
- Website: cnre.eu

The National Council of European Resistance (French: Conseil national de la résistance européenne, officially abbreviated as CNRE) is a France-based pan-European far-right political organization (Note: Officially registered as a nonprofit under the French law of 1901) co-founded by Renaud Camus and Karim Ouchikh on 9 November 2017 by analogy to the National Council of the Resistance. It has links to the Identitarian movement.

The council is intended to bring together qualified French and European personalities who aspire to "work for the defence of European civilization"—to oppose the Great Replacement, immigration to Europe, and, more generally, to defeat replacist totalitarianism, a concept theorized by Renaud Camus.

Membership in the council is strictly enlarged by co-option. Several high-ranking European officials have taken part, such as former President of the Czech Republic Václav Klaus, former members of the European Parliament Jean-Yves Le Gallou and Paul-Marie Coûteaux, former member of the European Parliament Janice Atkinson, former representative to the National Assembly of France Christian Vanneste, Belgian member of parliament Filip Dewinter, or Africanist historian Bernard Lugan.

== Name ==
The name Conseil national de la résistance européenne is a reference to the coordinating body of the French Resistance during the German occupation of France—the National Council of the Resistance. When asked how the CNRE could be both national and European, Renaud Camus replied:

The Council is national in that each and every nation is responsible for defending its independence and protecting its culture. It is European because our civilisational struggle must be fought in concert with and by all Europeans.

— Renaud Camus

== History ==
=== Background ===
Renaud Camus, a French writer and co-founder of the movement, coined in 2010–2011 the concept of "Great Replacement", a theory which supposes that "replacist elites" (Note: French: "élites remplacistes.") are colluding against the White French and Europeans in order to replace them with non-European peoples—specifically Muslim populations from Africa and the Middle East—through mass migration, demographic growth and a drop in the European birth rate; a process he labeled "genocide by substitution." Camus was a candidate in the 2012 French presidential election, but failed to gain enough elected representatives presentations to be able to run for president, and eventually decided to support Marine Le Pen.

=== Creation ===
On 9 November 2017, in a public address in Colombey-les-Deux-Églises—the village where Charles de Gaulle is buried—Renaud Camus announced the foundation of the National Council of European Resistance and asked for a collective European commitment.

All the European nations are invited to lead by our side the fight for the salvation of our common civilization, Celtic, Slavic, Greco-Latin, Judeo-Christian, and free-thinking.

— Renaud Camus

== Membership ==
=== Council ===
According to its official website, members of the CNRE include:

Members of the CNRE, by order of adhesion (November 2020)
Member	Role
Renaud Camus	President of the CNRE, president of the Parti de l’In-nocence
Karim Ouchikh	Vice-president of the CNRE, president of SIEL
Martine Pincemin	Treasurer of the CNRE, secretary of SIEL
Paul-Marie Coûteaux	Former MEP
Sébastien Jallamion	President of ANDELE
Václav Klaus	Former prime minister and president of the Czech Republic
Jean-Yves Le Gallou	Former MEP
Christian Vanneste	Former president of the Rally for France, president of La Droite Libre
Fabien Niezgoda	Former president of the Independent Ecological Movement
Jacques Clostermann	Former national delegate of the Rassemblement Bleu Marine
Rémi Soulié	Literary critic
Marco Santi	President of Démocratie Nationale
Marcel Meyer	Former president of the Parti de l’In-nocence
Nicolas Lacave	Vice-president of the Rassemblement pour l'indépendance et la souveraineté de la France
Aldo Sterone	YouTuber
Robert-Noël Castellani	UNESCO consultant
Filip Dewinter	Member of the Flemish Parliament, spokesman of Vlaams Belang
Christian Piquemal	Former General in the French Army
Antoine Martinez	General in the French Air Force
Richard Roudier	President of the Ligue du Midi
Frank Buhler	Former founding member of the Movement for France
Gérard Pince	Economist
Jean-Michel Darqué	Former Solidarist militant
Bernard Lugan	Historian
Janice Atkinson	Former MEP
Grégory Roose	Former departmental delegate of the Front National in Alpes-de-Haute-Provence
George Clément	President of the Comité Trump France
Jean-Louis Trainar	Webblogger
Gérard Hardy	Founder of the Volontaires pour la France
Bruno Lafourcade	Novelist

=== Public membership ===
Les Partisans du CNRE is a legal association created concurrently with the Council under the French law of 1901. Its purpose is to welcome natural persons and legal entities of French or foreign nationality, who wish to actively support the action of the CNRE, by relaying its ideas, through militant actions or through financial contributions.
