= Antoine Martinez =

French far right activist (born 1948)

Antoine Martinez (born January 17, 1948) is a French far-right activist and former general. He is president of the Volontaires pour la France (VPF) party since 2016.

A retired Air Force brigadier general since 2005, he entered politics in 2015. With politician Yvan Blot, he founded Volontaires pour la France, which brings together mainly former military and police officers and defends a radically anti-Islam, anti-immigration and nationalist line. It gained strength after the November 2015 Paris attacks. More radical militants split off in 2017 to form Action des Forces Opérationnelles.

Antoine Martinez gained media notoriety through his participation in “generals' tribunes”, signed alongside Christian Piquemal and Didier Tauzin, which criticized the management of immigration by François Hollande and then by Emmanuel Macron. Martinez is also a member of the National Council of European Resistance, founded by identitarian Renaud Camus and described as pro-Russian.

== Military career ==
Antoine François Martinez was born in 1948 and spent his childhood in Oran, French Algeria.

A brigadier general in the French Air Force, he joined the Second Section (reservists who have left active service) in 2005. In 2018, he resided in Nice, Alpes-Maritimes.

He is an executive member of the Association des Officiers de Réserve (which is part of the Union Nationale des Officiers de Réserve), an association of retired officers in the Pyrénées-Orientales region, and was re-elected to its presidency in 2013.

== Political activism ==
=== Volontaires pour la France ===
Alongside Yvan Blot, co-founder of the Carrefour de l'Horloge and then National Front MEP in the 1990s, Antoine Martinez co-founded “Volontaires pour la France” in the summer of 2015. Essentially made up of former members of the army and police, the far-right political organization's aim is to “fight” the “Islamization” and “Africanization” of Europe to “defend French identity”, and to combat the so-called international lobbies that would have allegedly “captured” democratic power.

Born on the Internet, the organization organized its first event in October 2015 in the Provence-Alpes-Côte d'Azur region and gained momentum in the wake of the November 2015 Paris attacks. After registering its trademark in November 2015, the organization was incorporated as an association under the French law of 1901 in October 2016 in Ingré (Loiret), by Gérard Hardy (then as a political party between 2017 and 2018). Martinez and Blot took over the presidency. Following the death of Yvan Blot in 2018, Antoine Martinez assumes the presidency alone.

The VPF claim 800 members in 2018, while Mediapart puts the figure at just 50. The party has a list of “Honorary Volunteers”, which testifies to the ethnocultural nature of its nationalism. It includes anti-Islam activists, traditionalist national Catholics and ultraconservatives: Father Guy Pagès, Brother Thierry, Americans Steve King and Rosine Ghawji, General Christian Piquemal, former MP Christian Vanneste and Renaud Camus, propagator of the conspiracy theory of the Great Replacement and cofounder of the National Council of European Resistance, who Antoine Martinez is a member of.

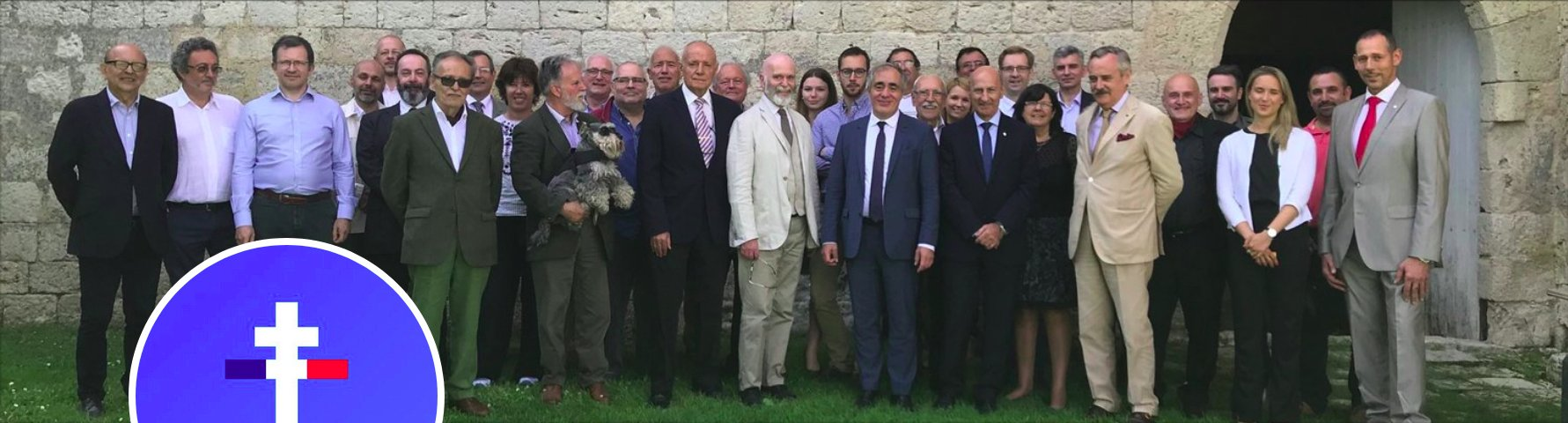
Antoine Martinez (10th from right) at a meeting of the National Council of European Resistance in 2018, alongside Christian Piquemal, Christian Vanneste, Renaud Camus, Damien Rieu, Karim Ouchikh and Richard Roudier, among others.

The Volontaires pour la France cultivate a military idea and claim not to be a militia. On their website, they announce that “Volunteers can train, learn and practice thanks to training days, weekends and seminars organized by the organization's executives and led by specialists in all fields”.

Under investigation by the General Directorate for Internal Security, Volunteers for France formed as an association in 2016. A rift developed between the leaders, who wished to place their activism within a legal framework, and militants who wished to take action. The following year, led by recruiters Guy Sibra (who sat on the board of directors of the VPF) and Dominique Compain, a group of militants split off to found Action des Forces Opérationnelles. The group was dismantled and arrested in 2018, accused of planning an attack against Muslims.

Antoine Martinez presented his candidacy for the 2022 presidential election on July 12, 2020. In his declaration, he describes France as “fractured, disfigured and martyred”, in a “fight” that “can only be sovereignist, identitarian and cultural”, and hopes to “provoke the national awakening essential to the re-establishment of a strong state”, “outside of political parties”. He is supported by General Christian Piquemal.

In the 2021 regional elections in Brittany, the VPF, led by Yves Chauvel and labeled sovereignist, obtained 0.07% of the regional vote.

=== Anti-immigration and anti-Islam media petitions ===
Antoine Martinez came to prominence in 2016 when he signed an open letter to French President François Hollande criticizing the management of the migrant crisis in Calais, alongside Yvan Blot and generals Pierre Coursier and Jean du Verdier. They claim that Calais has become a lawless zone “de facto abandoned by the authorities of the Republic” in the face of the “massive” entry of “illegal migrants”, who are causing Calais residents to suffer “a disastrous existential situation” “in the terror of mafia gangs”, even though they should enjoy the protection of the President, “guarantor of the integrity of the territory”. They call for changes to the Le Touquet and Schengen border treaties. This breach of his duty of reserve earned Martinez threats of sanction from the Ministry of Defence. It was prompted by the controversial participation of Second Platoon General Christian Piquemal in a Pegida France anti-immigration demonstration in Calais, for which he was disbarred from the army. Martinez founded and chaired his support committee.

After calling for demonstrations within the Yellow vests movement on November 17, 2018, he initiated an open letter to President Emmanuel Macron written by General Didier Tauzin. The letter denounces the Global Compact for Migration, known as the “Marrakech Pact”, which establishes a legally non-binding framework for international cooperation, claiming that the pact would instead cause a loss of national sovereignty over migration policies and accuses the President of the Republic of “treason”. It received the signatures of a dozen high-ranking military officers, including Christian Piquemal, as well as former Defence Minister Charles Millon; the tribune was massively relayed by several Yellow vests groups.

In April 2021, Antoine Martinez signed an article with seventeen other retired generals published by the far-right magazine Valeurs actuelles (including Christian Piquemal and several signatories of his 2018 open letter, and a second VPF member, General Roland Dubois). In it, they denounce a “disintegration” of the nation, requiring the immediate “eradication” of “Islamism” and of “the suburban hordes”, failing which “civil war will put an end to this growing chaos” by an “intervention of our active comrades in a perilous mission to protect our civilizational values”. The article, signed mainly by retired officers from the far right and close to conspiracy circles, has caused controversy.

=== Political ideas ===
Antoine Martinez rejects the “radical” or “ultra-right” labels in favor of “patriotic” or “unabashedly right-wing”. He claims to defend France's “cultural heritage”, stemming from “Greco-Roman culture and the Christian religion”, so that the country “regains its greatness and power” and “once again becomes a beacon of humanity”.

His ideas are hostile to immigration and Islam, which he considers “absolutely not” compatible with the French Republic. He sees migrants as a “threat” to the “nation”, referring to “migratory submersion” and declaring that “there are more than two million radicalized Muslims in our country ready to switch to the jihadist signal”. He considers himself to be a “whistleblower” for his public statements on this subject; according to him, the “duty of expression takes precedence over the duty of reserve”, and he accuses the State of respecting neither the Constitution nor republican laws.

In his presidential project for 2022, Antoine Martinez calls for a ban on the hijab in public spaces and the “immediate closure of Muslim Brotherhood-aligned, Salafist, Tabligh, Wahhabi and Turkish mosques”. He would like to see the loss of citizenship and deportation of dual nationals who commit crimes, together with their families, because according to him, “everything is linked”, as well as national preference for welfare and the abolition of multiple citizenship outside European countries. He also calls for a total halt to immigration outside Europe and the deportation of illegal immigrants to their countries of origin.

He claims to identify with the political vision of the Visegrád Group, an Eastern European intergovernmental organization, and in particular with the Hungarian head of government Viktor Orbán, whose “decisions [...] on this gender and LGBT issue” he “fully agrees with. We need to protect our children from these delusional excesses.”

Various sources, including Challenges magazine in an investigation described as “particularly well-documented” and that of journalist Nicolas Quénel, confirmed by sources within the army and army intelligence, place him among the pro-Russian military, under the influence of Kremlin propaganda and admirers of Vladimir Putin.
