= Bernard Lugan =

French historian (born 1946)

- Born: Bernard Jean René Lugan; 10 May 1946 (age 80); Meknes, French protectorate of Morocco
- Education: Paris Nanterre University
- Occupation: African history
- Organization: National Council of European Resistance

Bernard Jean René Lugan (French pronunciation: [bɛʁnaʁ lyɡɑ̃]; born 10 May 1946) is a French historian who specialises in African history. He is a professor at the Institut des hautes études de défense nationale (IHEDN) and the editor of the journal L'Afrique réelle ("Real Africa"). Lugan previously taught at Jean Moulin University Lyon 3 and at the special military school of Saint-Cyr until 2015 when he was dismissed for his positions leaning towards the far right. He served as an expert witness for Hutu defendants involved in the Rwandan genocide at the International Criminal Tribunal for Rwanda. Close to the far-right, Lugan is a self-declared monarchist and right-wing anarchist.

== Early life and education ==
Bernard Lugan was born in Meknes on 10 May 1946. During his student years in the mid-1960s, Lugan began his political activism within the radical right student milieu. At Nanterre University, he became a member of the corporate student association (Corpo Lettres), which was affiliated with the Fédération Nationale des Étudiants de France (FNEF), itself born out of a split from the UNEF during the Algerian War. During the May 1968 events, he was the head of Action Française's security personnel. Lugan earned a PhD in history in 1976 after a thesis on Rwandan economy in the 19th century.

== Academic career ==
Lugan moved to Africa in the early 1970s where he conducted archaeological research in Rwanda. The results were published in Études Rwandaises and Tervuren between 1978 and 1983. From 1972, he taught African history at the National University of Rwanda. In June 1982, Lugan left Rwanda and became an associate professor of African history at Jean Moulin University Lyon 3.

In 1983, Lugan authored another thesis for a state doctorate, Between the servitudes of the hoe and the spells of the cow: the rural world in ancient Rwanda. In 1988, he received the M. et Mme Louis Marin prize from the Académie Française for his book The French People Who Made South Africa. In September 1993, he founded the review L'Afrique Réelle, which has been described as a supporter of "Boers-Afrikaners" in South Africa. Lugan has also been involved with far-right news outlets like Minute, National-Hebdo or Présent, which regard him as a specialist of African history. Until 2006, he hosted a talk show on Radio Courtoisie named the Libre Journal.

Lugan served as a Professor at the military school of Saint-Cyr until 2015, when his class was suspended at the request of the French Defence Ministry. He is now teaching at the Institut des Hautes Études de Défense Nationale (IHEDN).

== International Criminal Tribunal for Rwanda ==
Following the Rwandan genocide of 1994, Lugan served an expert witness at the International Criminal Tribunal for Rwanda. He was cited by several Hutu defendants ultimately convicted for their involvement in the genocide, including Théoneste Bagosora, Tharcisse Renzaho and Emmanuel Ndindabahizi.

Although he does not deny the existence or downplay the figures of the genocide, Lugan controversially claims that the events were not "programmed" by the Hutu leadership, and that president Juvénal Habyarimana was not assassinated by Hutu extremists. In the 1990–2000s, several media and personalities have been condemned for libel for calling Lugan a "genocide denier" or a "supporter of apartheid". At the 2001 World Conference against Racism, Senegalese President Abdoulaye Wade publicly labelled Lugan's work a form of "intellectual racism" and accused him of minimizing the contributions of Black people to the history of Africa in his research.

== Political involvement ==
Lugan is a self-declared monarchist. When testifying at the International Criminal Tribunal for Rwanda, Lugan admitted that he is a right-wing anarchist, adding: "of musketeer leaning". He is in favour of the re-establishment of dueling for libel and public insult, and founded in 1990 with Vladimir Volkoff an association to promote this agenda.

In 2012–2013, Lugan was among the sponsors of TV Libertés, a web TV. In June 2014, he co-founded the Institut Iliade with Jean-Yves Le Gallou and Philippe Conrad, a think tank which describes itself "in the continuity of Dominique Venner's thought and action". The organization held a colloquium with Renaud Camus, Charlotte d'Ornellas and Jean Raspail in April 2016. Lugan is also a member of the National Council of European Resistance, launched in November 2017 and presided by Renaud Camus.

== Bibliography ==
- Le Safari du Kaiser, La Table Ronde, Paris, 1987, 231 p. ISBN 9782710392309
- Huguenots et Français : ils ont fait l'Afrique du Sud, La Table ronde, Paris, 1988, 296 p.
- History of South Africa, Garzanti Publishing, 1989, 1st éd. : Perrin, coll. « Vérités et légendes », Paris, 1986, 272 p.
- Afrique : l'histoire à l'endroit, Perrin, coll. « Vérités et légendes », 1989, 285 p. Rééd. : 1996
- The Last Boer Commando: A French Volunteer in the Anglo-Boer War, 1900-1902, éd. du Rocher, 1989
- Villebois-Mareuil, le La Fayette de l'Afrique du Sud, éd. du Rocher, 1990
- When Africa was German, Jean Picollec, coll. « Documents dossiers », Paris, 1990, 267+16 p. ISBN 2-86477-108-X
- Afrique, bilan de la décolonisation, 1st éd. : Perrin, coll. « Vérités et légendes », Paris, 1991, 304 p. Rééd. : 1996
- La Louisiane française : 1682-1804, Perrin, coll. « Vérités et légendes », Paris, 1994, 273 p. Titre alternatif : Histoire de la Louisiane française : 1682-1804
- Afrique : de la colonisation philanthropique à la recolonisation humanitaire, C. de Bartillat, coll. « Gestes », Étrépilly, 1995, 390 p.
- The French People Who Made South Africa, Bartillat, coll. « Gestes », Étrépilly, 1996, 430 p. ISBN 2-84100-086-9
- Histoire du Rwanda : de la préhistoire à nos jours, Bartillat, Paris, 1997, 606 p.
- La guerre des Boers : 1899-1902, éd. Perrin, Paris, 1998, 364+8 p.
- History of Morocco, éd. Perrin et éd. Critérion, coll. « Pour l'histoire », Paris, 2000, 363 p.
- Atlas historique de l'Afrique des origines à nos jours, Éd. du Rocher, Paris, Monaco, 2001 (2nd ed. 2018), 268 p. ISBN 978-2268096445
- Histoire de l'Égypte, des origines à nos jours, éd. du Rocher, Paris, Monaco, 2002, 290 p. ISBN 978-2268081670
- Douze années de combats judiciaires (1990-2002), Lyon, Édition de l’Afrique réelle, s.d.
- African Legacy; Solutions for a Community in Crisis, Carnot, 224p, 2003, ISBN 1-59209-035-4.
- Rwanda : le génocide, l'Église et la démocratie, éd. du Rocher, Paris et Monaco, 2004, 234 p. ISBN 978-2268050607
- François Mitterrand, l'armée française et le Rwanda, éd. du Rocher, Paris, Monaco, 2005, 288 p. ISBN 978-2268054155
- Rwanda. Contre-enquête sur le génocide, éd. Privat, 2007, ISBN 978-2708968752
- Rwanda : un génocide en questions, Editions du Rocher, 2014, ISBN 978-2-268-07579-2
- Osons dire la vérité à l'Afrique, Monaco-Paris, France, Éditions du Rocher, 2015, 224 p. ISBN 978-2-268-07740-6
- Histoire de l'Afrique du Nord (Egypte, Libye, Tunisie, Algérie, Maroc) : Des Origines à nos jours, Éditions du Rocher, 736 p., 2016, ISBN 978-226808-167-0
- Rwanda. Contre-enquête sur le génocide, éd. Privat, 2007.
- Les Guerres du Sahel : des origines à nos jours, L'Afrique réelle, 2019
- Dix ans d'expertises devant le Tribunal pénal international pour le Rwanda (TPIR), L'Afrique réelle, 2020
- Esclavage : l'histoire à l'endroit, L'Afrique réelle, 2020
- Pour répondre aux « décoloniaux », aux islamo-gauchistes et aux terroristes de la repentance, Éditions Bernard Lugan, 264 p., 2021
- Colonisation, l'histoire à l'endroit : Comment la France est devenue la colonie de ses colonies, L'Afrique réelle, 240 p., 2022, (ISBN 978-2-492-47709-6)
- Histoire du Sahel, Éditions du Rocher, 2023, 224 pages, (ISBN 978-2268108582)
- Histoire des Berbères, Paris et Monaco, Éditions du Rocher, 2024, 240 p. (ISBN 978-2268110165)
- Histoire des Algéries : des origines à nos jours, 2025, 304p, Ellipses (ISBN 978-2340099586)
- Quand les Africains colonisaient l'Afrique, Paris, Éditions du Rocher, 2026, 240 p. (ISBN 978-2-268-11277-0)
