= TV Libertés =

French far-right web TV

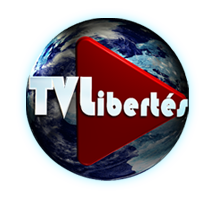
- Headquarters: Le Kremlin-Bicêtre

Programming
- Language: French

History
- Launched: January 2014

Links
- Website: www.tvlibertes.com

TV Libertés, or TVL (English: "TV Liberties"), is a French far-right Web TV launched in January 2014. The group is led by Philippe Milliau and Martial Bild, a former Front National leader. TV Libertés seeks to compete with mainstream cable TV. Alain de Benoist and Gilbert Collard, among others, have hosted talk shows on the channel.

== History ==
=== Background ===
The project was initiated as "Notre antenne" by Philippe Millau (former GRECE and Bloc Identitaire) and Gilles Arnaud (former Front National). In 2013, the founders called for donations, hoping to raise around 1.5 million euros. Numerous far-right figures responded by sponsoring the project, among them Jean-Yves Le Gallou, Yvan Blot, Robert Ménard, Philippe Conrad, Paul-Marie Coûteaux, Renaud Camus, Bruno Mégret, Pierre Descaves, Michel Marmin, Roger Holeindre, Jean-Michel Dubernard, Bernard Lugan, and Jean Raspail. TV Libertés was officially launched on YouTube in January 2014.

=== Development ===
TV Libertés has promoted pro-Russian views regarding international relations. In September 2014 it was the only French TV channel allowed to cover a meeting of Sergey Naryshkin held at the Russian embassy in Paris. During the informal parliamentary election held in the Donetsk People's Republic and the Luhansk People's Republic, TV Libertés was allowed to cover the work of the French "election monitor", Jean-Luc Shaffhauser.

Since 2017, it broadcasts a video talk show, Le Plus d'Élements, hosted by Olivier François in collaboration with the Nouvelle Droite magazine Éléments.

In June 2018, the YouTube channel was shut down due to "infringement to copyright", which led to critical reactions from Front National members, including its leader Marine Le Pen. The organization started to publish videos again on YouTube in February 2019.

== Organization ==
TV Libertés is directed by Philippe Milliau, the president of the channel, and Martial Bild, who serves as its editor-in-chief. The group also owns a radio station named "Radio Libertés".

== Guests ==
The aim of the channel is to bridge far-right and mainstream right-wing figures. Several FN politicians have been interviewed, including Thierry Mariani, Marion Maréchal, Nicolas Bay, Louis Aliot, and Bruno Gollnisch. Various figures of the French right have also been invited, such as Jean-Marie Le Pen, Philippe de Villiers, Nicolas Dupont-Aignan, Christine Boutin, or Ivan Rioufol.
