= Charlotte d'Ornellas =

French journalist and columnist (born 1986)

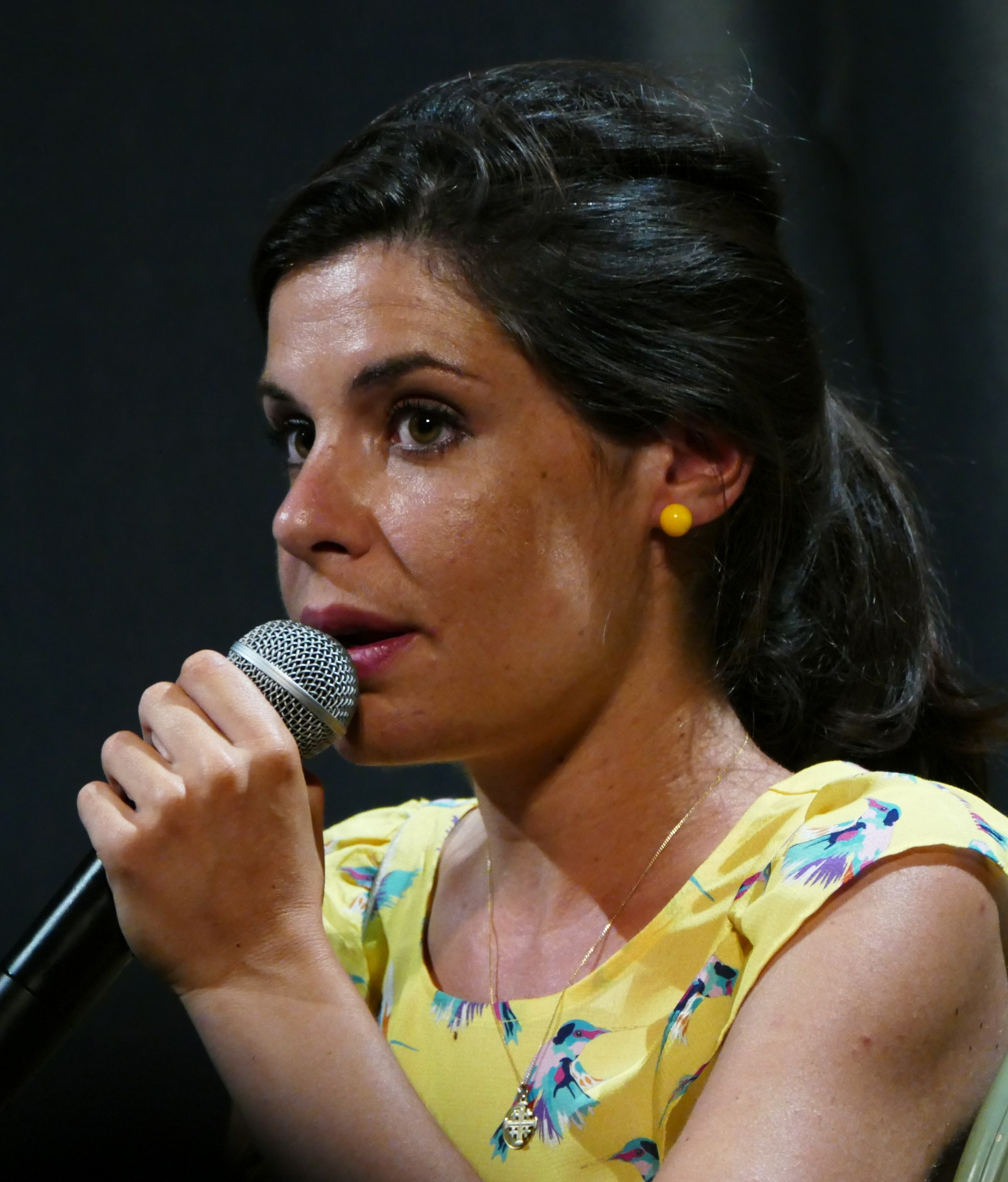
- Charlotte d'Ornellas in 2017
- Born: 1986 (age 39–40); Orléans, France
- Occupations: Journalist; Columnist
- Family: Pierre d'Ornellas (uncle)

Charlotte d'Ornellas (born 1986) is a French conservative journalist and columnist.

== Biography ==
Coming from a practising Catholic family from Orléans, where she was born, d'Ornellas is related to the Archbishop of Rennes, Pierre d'Ornellas, who was the private secretary to Cardinal Jean-Marie Lustiger, former bishop of Orleans. At the age of 16, she was nominated to be Joan of Arc at the Fêtes johanniques d'Orléans in 2002.

In 2004, she entered the Institute of Comparative Philosophy in Paris where she obtained a degree in philosophy and psychology. In 2008, she left for a year in Sydney, Australia, to improve her English. Towards the end of this visit, the International Media Center recruited her to participate in the translation of Australian press releases to the French press and official speeches on the occasion of World Youth Day 2008. Until then, her goal was to teach philosophy.

When she returned in 2008, she decided to study journalism and graduated from IFJ-FACO in 2010. In 2009, Charlotte d'Ornellas completed her end-of-studies internship at L'Orient-Le Jour, in Beirut, Lebanon.

Back in France in 2009, she worked for La Nouvelle République du Centre-Ouest, a regional daily newspaper based in Tours. She is employed as a trainee in the "Society and World" service of the weekly magazine Valeurs actuelles in 2009–2010, then in "Tous les goûts sont dans la culture" on Direct 8 in 2010. In addition, she makes, from January 2009 at October 2012, interviews for current values and Christian family. From July 2011, she worked on the realization and the presentation of a weekly newspaper for the webTV of the CFTC trade union and the writing of her weekly Confederal Letter.

An independent journalist, she works mainly on the news site Boulevard Voltaire, founded in 2012 by Robert Ménard, at Valeurs Actuelles and the Catholic news site Aleteia. Her articles also appear regularly in the national-Catholic daily Present. In addition, she regularly appears on Radio Courtoisie and is a columnist ("sociétaire") in the program "Bistro Libertés" animated by Martial Bild on TV-Libertés. In 2016, she founded with Damien Rieu, former spokesperson of Génération Identitaire, the magazine France, a quarterly magazine, distributed free online, of which she is editor-in-chief. The first issue was published in March 2016. In September 2017, she joined the editorial board of the magazine L'Incorrect, newly founded by Charles Beigbeder.
