= Male Companion =

1964 film by Philippe de Broca

- French theatrical release poster
- French: Un monsieur de compagnie
- Directed by: Philippe de Broca
- Screenplay by: Philippe de Broca
- Dialogue by: Philippe de Broca; Henri Lanoë
- Based on: Gentleman in Waiting by André Couteaux
- Produced by: Julien Derode
- Starring: Jean-Pierre Cassel; Irina Demick; Catherine Deneuve; Annie Girardot; Valérie Lagrange; Sandra Milo; Adolfo Celi; Dalio; André Luguet; Jean-Pierre Marielle; Jean-Claude Brialy
- Cinematography: Raoul Coutard
- Edited by: Françoise Javet
- Music by: Georges Delerue
- Production companies: PECF; Les Films du Siècle; Ultra Film
- Distributed by: 20th Century Fox
- Release dates: 4 November 1964 (France); 11 November 1964 (Italy)
- Running time: 105 minutes
- Countries: France; Italy
- Language: French
- Box office: $3.9 million

Male Companion (French: Un monsieur de compagnie) is a 1964 comedy film written and directed by Philippe de Broca, based on the 1961 novel Gentleman in Waiting by André Couteaux. The film stars Jean-Pierre Cassel.

== Plot ==
Antoine was raised into the easy life by his wealthy grandfather. Following the death of his grandfather, the money has gone and Antoine falls under the influence of various "easy" people.

== Cast ==
- Jean-Pierre Cassel as Antoine Mirliflor
- Irina Demick as Nicole
- Catherine Deneuve as Isabelle
- Annie Girardot as Clara
- Valérie Lagrange as Louisette
- Sandra Milo as Maria
- Adolfo Celi as Benvenuto
- Dalio as Socratès
- André Luguet as the grandfather
- Jean-Pierre Marielle as Balthazar
- Irène Chabrier as Ernestine
- Renée Passeur as the boss
- Rosy Varte as Isabelle's mother
- Sacha Briquet as the authorised representative
- Jacques Dynam as Isabelle's father
- Christian Lude as the notary
- Jean-Claude Brialy as the prince
- Mino Doro as Professor Gaetano (uncredited)
- Rosemary Dexter as a student (uncredited)
- Memmo Carotenuto as the policeman in Rome (uncredited)
- Giustino Durano as the baker (uncredited)
- Geneviève Fontanel as Socratès's friend (uncredited)

== Reception ==
According to Fox records, the film needed to earn $1.4 million in rentals to break even and made $780,000, meaning it made a loss.
