= No-harm Party =

No-harm Party Parti de l'in-nocence
- Abbreviation: PI
- Founder: Renaud Camus
- Founded: November 29, 2002
- Ideology: Racialism
- Political position: Big tent to far-right

Website
- www.in-nocence.org

The No-harm Party (French: Parti de l'in-nocence, PI) is a French political party described as big tent or far-right. It was founded by Renaud Camus, novelist and creator of the Great Replacement conspiracy theory in 2002.

== History ==
The party was founded on November 29, 2002 and its declaration appeared on the Journal officiel de la République française.

For the release of his book Abécédaire de l'in-nocence, he declares himself as a candidate to the 2012 presidential election but failed to get the necessary endorsements and calls his adherents to vote for Marine Le Pen.
