= Christine Tasin =

French writer and activist (born 1955)

- Born: 24 January 1955 (age 71)
- Occupations: Writer, activist
- Website: resistancerepublicaine.com

Christine Tasin (born 24 January 1955) is a French anti-Islam writer, activist and founder of the Republican Resistance. She has been convicted several times for inciting hatred against Muslims.

== Biography ==
Tasin speaking at a rally in 2015

Tasin is an atheist and comes from a politically leftist background, having been a member of the Socialist Party (PS) and the Citizen and Republican Movement (MRC). She has been married twice, and has three children from her first marriage. Her attention to Islam was started with the Islamic scarf controversy in 1989. She has collaborated with Riposte Laïque, founded in 2007, and is in a relationship with its founder Pierre Cassen. As a counter-jihad activist, she founded the Republican Resistance in 2010, which organises social gatherings and demonstrations together with Riposte Laïque. In 2010 she notably helped organise a "wine and pork aperitif" event in a heavily Muslim neighbourhood in Paris. She has later participated in Pegida demonstrations in Germany, and in the Sovereignty, Identity and Freedoms (SIEL) political party together with Renaud Camus among others.

=== Legal issues ===
Tasin has been sentenced several times for inciting hatred against Muslims, to 3,000 euros in 2014 for remarks in front of a mobile slaughterhouse installed for the ritual sacrifice of Eid al-Adha in October 2013, to 1,000 euros in 2015 for writings on the website Boulevard Voltaire in May 2013, and to 1,500 euros in 2017 for a speech at a SIEL demonstration following the 2016 Magnanville stabbing.

She claims that her convictions are unjustified since French law does not prohibit blasphemy, as she claims to only attack Islam and not Muslims, and states to be an anti-racist activist. She won an appeal of one of her convictions in 2014, during which her legal costs were covered by the American Middle East Forum. During a trial in 2015 she stated "Yes, I'm Islamophobic, so what? I am proud of the hatred of Islam. Islam is a shit".

== Publications ==
- Assises internationales sur l'islamisation de nos pays - 18 décembre 2010 (with Pierre Cassen), 2010 ISBN 978-2953604221
- La faute du bobo Jocelyn (with Pierre Cassen), 2011 ISBN 978-2953604238
- Apero Saucisson Pinard (with Pierre Cassen and Fabrice Robert), 2012 ISBN 9782888921486
- Qu'est-ce qu'elle vous a fait la république?, 2013 ISBN 978-2954637907
- Les assassins obéissent au Coran (with René d'Armor), 2016 ISBN 978-2954637914
- L'islam à la conquête de l'école, 2017 ISBN 978-2954637945
- Assassins Obey The Quran: Fort Hood, San Bernadino, Orlando (with René d'Armor), 2017 ISBN 978-2954637921
