= Action des Forces Opérationnelles =

Inactive French far-right accelerationist group

Action des Forces Opérationnelles (AFO) was a French islamophobic, white nationalist and militant accelerationist armed group founded in August 2017 by Guy Sibra and Dominique Compain and dismantled in June 2018. It is suspected by French justice of planning terrorist attacks targeting Muslim persons.

== History ==
In a post-November 2015 Paris attacks context, Guy Sibra, a seller of decommissioned military equipment, former head brigadier of the Compagnies Républicaines de Sécurité and member of Antoine Martinez and Yvan Blot's Volontaires pour la France (VPF), believed that the VPF were too legalistic, did not act enough and were no longer sufficient to act against "Islamization". Divergences erupted between supporters of direct action and other members during the national convention of the VPF in May 2017.

As a result, Guy Sibra and Dominique Compain founded Action des Forces Opérationnelles with around twenty people in August 2017 in Barbizon (Seine-et-Marne). AFO was initially the armed branch of the VPF. Eventually, the number of members would grow to around fifty. AFP split from the VPF in October 2017, (or would have been excluded according to the VPF) and became off-limits to VPF members.

In 2018, members of Action des Forces Opérationnelles led an intimidation operation against the Maghrebi neighbors of a daughter of one of AFO's members. During the yellow vests protests, multiple Facebook pages contributing to the movement were tied to the AFO.

== Planned attacks ==
The AFO planned to assassinate Salafi imams and personalities such as Islamologist Tariq Ramadan and rapper Médine. They had also planned to poison halal food in supermarkets, the storm of a mosque in Clichy (Hauts-de-Seine), assaults of veiled women and of Muslim former prisoners, and to throw explosives into the vehicles of Muslim families. For historian and political scientist Stéphane François, "it was about revenge for the 2015 attacks, but not just that: it was also about fighting Islam and Muslims".

== Organization ==
AFO members were encouraged to adopt a pseudonym and to use encrypted messaging.

Adepts of survivalism, AFO members organized fallback zones in which they stuck up on food and basic necessities. They set up various warning codes to assess the disaster situation and take the necessary measures accordingly. They also organized survivalism courses during which were taught the use of firearms and crossbows, techniques for thwarting police surveillance, the manufacture of napalm and explosives, military combat techniques and legal training for police custody.

=== Structure ===
AFO was structured into three circles, each named after a color. Members of the "white" circle provided logistical support to the organization, those of the "grey" circle trained recruits and supported the group's actions, and those of the "black" circle had to take action. The members of this last circle, made up of around ten people, were clandestine and other AFO members did not know their identity. With Service d'Action Civique as a model, AFO was structured in local cells, under the control of regional cells which in turn reported to the national structure. The AFO's Île-de-France cell was notably active.

=== Recruitments ===
Members were recruited through the Internet, on websites Guerredefrance.fr and Réveil patriote, as well as among shooting sports clubs and within Volontaires pour la France. In 2018, AFO was looking to recruit members from the police, the military and the hunting community.

=== Organizational structure ===
The group included many ex-military personnel, reservists and police officers. According to historian Nicolas Lebourg, a large proportion of the members were of old age and were wealthy. According to political scientist Jean-Yves Camus, "its members work according to the principle "soldier one day, soldier forever!" Years, even decades after leaving uniform, they imagine themselves still invested with a sacred mission, which would be to save France..."

== Legal case ==
The cell was spotted by the General Directorate for Internal Security (Direction générale de la sécurité interieure, DGSI) in February 2018. In June 2018, following the group's infiltration by a DGSI agent and the discovery of grenade-throwing trainings in the forest, ten AFO members were arrested. Dozens of firearms and thousands of ammunition were found during searches, including components used to manufacture TATP-type explosives. In July 2018, two other members were arrested. However, in the absence of sufficient charges, most members were released and placed under judicial supervision.

In June 2019, another AFO member, who was a diplomat of the French Embassy in Salvador, was indicted for membership of the group. In October 2019, another person was indicted in the case.

In May 2023, the Parquet National Antiterroriste (Pnat) requested a trial for 15 AFO members suspected of terrorist criminal association between 2017 and 2018, and of another AFO member for weapons and explosives offenses. This makes it the most important case of violent right-wing extremism brought before the French courts.

== Ideology ==
The AFO is islamophobic and sees itself as a force of resistance to what it perceives as the "Islamic peril". It is thus explicitly opposed to Muslims. AFO is classified to the far right of the political spectrum. With its desire to construct "white" communities, AFO is also white nationalist, although historians Nicolas Lebourg and Marlène Laruelle note that the AFO does not mobilize this ideology's references, instead proclaiming itself Gaullist. It is also classified as identitarian.

Its members are afraid of "Great Replacement", which they envision both in its Islamophobic dimension and in its antisemitic conspiracist version. They reckon that the 2015 attacks in France were a continuation of the Algerian War and believe in the imminence of an ethnic civil war, estimating that a civilization conflict has been underway since the September 11 attacks. Pnat considers it belongs to the accelerationist political tendency, while Nicolas Lebourg also describes it as "radicalized populist".

The organization considers "supporters of the Islamic system", "sub-Saharan Africans", "leftists" and "droits-de-l'hommistes" (literally: "human rightsists") as enemies. According to political scientist Jean-Yves Camus, they see migrants as a fifth column of Islam.
