= Sovereignty, Identity and Freedoms =

Sovereignty, Identity and Freedoms Souveraineté, identité et libertés
- Abbreviation: SIEL
- President: Karim Ouchikh
- Founder: Paul-Marie Coûteaux
- Founded: 2011
- Membership (2016): 2,000
- Ideology: Sovereigntism; Identitarianism
- Political position: Far-right
- National Assembly: 0 / 577
- Senate: 0 / 348
- European Parliament: 0 / 74

Sovereignty, Identity and Freedoms (French: Souveraineté, identité et libertés, SIEL) is a French political party led by Karim Ouchikh. Originally described as right-wing sovereigntist, it later moved towards Identitarianism. The party had 2,000 members in 2016.

The party was founded in 2011 by eurosceptic Paul-Marie Coûteaux in the run-up to the 2012 elections. The party was formerly the only other party that was part of the Rassemblement bleu Marine coalition of Marine Le Pen, which it left in 2016. The party counts among its members Renaud Camus, creator of the Great Replacement conspiracy theory, as well as anti-Islam activists Pierre Cassen and Christine Tasin. The party advocates remigration of immigrants.

== See also ==
- History of far-right movements in France
