= Pierre Cassen =

French writer and activist

- Born: 24 January 1953 (age 73)
- Occupations: Writer, activist
- Website: pierrecassen.ripostelaique.com

Pierre Cassen (born 24 January 1953) is a French writer and the founder of the anti-Islam news portal Riposte Laïque.

== Biography ==
Cassen is described as an old Trotskyist and former member of the Revolutionary Communist League (LCR), and was a typographer and a former trade unionist for the General Confederation of Labour (CGT). He has said that his aim with Riposte Laïque, founded in 2007, is to create a new web-based journal as a forum for the defence of secularism, particularly against the threat from Islam. Although Cassen still identifies as a leftist and says the journal has a staff from a variety of political backgrounds, it is often portrayed as far-right. Cassen participated in the international counter-jihad conference in Brussels in 2012. In 2014, he was invited by Swiss People's Party parliamentarian Oskar Freysinger to give a talk titled "Islam: A danger for our democracy?". He was part of an initiative to launch Pegida France alongside French writer Renaud Camus, Swiss politician Jean-Luc Addor, Pierre Renversez of the Belgian "No to Islam" and Melanie Dittmer of the German Pegida in 2015. He has been a close associate of Florian Philippot, president of The Patriots party, while supporting Éric Zemmour in the 2022 French presidential election.

He is in a relationship with Christine Tasin, whom he met at the first editorial conference of Riposte Laïque. Both are activists and have been fined for hate speech against Muslims. They have arranged demonstrations together with hundreds of protesters against "Islamisation", Tasin as leader of the closely associated group Republican Resistance.

== Publications ==
- “Touche pas au plomb !” mémoire des derniers typographes de la presse parisienne (with Isabelle Repiton), 2008, ISBN 978-2841097357
- Assises internationales sur l'islamisation de nos pays (with Christine Tasin), 2011, ISBN 978-2953604221
- La faute du bobo Jocelyn (with Christine Tasin), 2011, ISBN 978-2953604238
- Apéro saucisson-pinard: coulisses et enjeux d'un rassemblement qui a secoué la France (with Christine Tasin and Fabrice Robert), 2012, ISBN 978-2888921486
- Le guignol de l'Élysée, 2014, ISBN 978-2953604290
- Et la gauche devint la putain de l'Islam, 2018, ISBN 979-1092938166
- 2022 Zemmour aura le dernier mot (with Jacques Guillemain), 2021, ISBN 979-1092938227
- Transgression: Voyages du camp du « bien » vers le camp du « mal » (with Bernard Germain), 2023, ISBN 978-2367980997
