= Jean-Luc Addor =

Swiss lawyer and politician

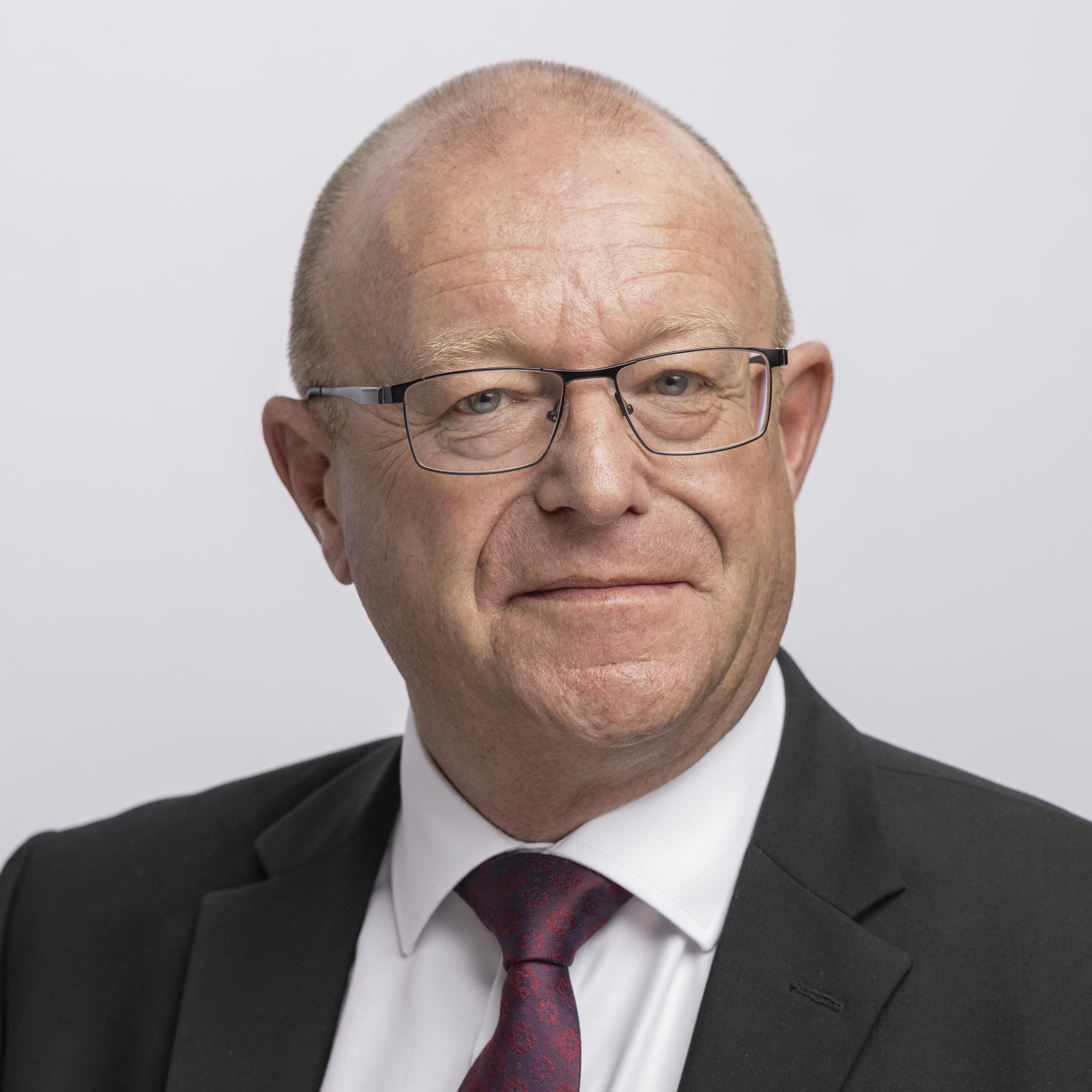
- Addor in 2023

Member of the National Council
- Incumbent
- Assumed office 30 November 2015
- Constituency: Valais

Personal details
- Born: 22 April 1964 (age 61) Lausanne, Switzerland
- Party: Democratic Union of the Centre

Jean-Luc Addor (born 22 April 1964) is a Swiss-Italian lawyer and politician of the Democratic Union of the Centre (UDC) elected to the National Council in 2015 from canton of Valais. He is known for his critical stance on Islam. He was convicted for racism and incitement to violence in 2017.

== Early life and education ==
Jean-Luc Addor was born in 1964 Lausanne with roots to Savièse, in the canton of Valais, and Sainte-Croix, in the canton of Vaud. He holds Swiss and Italian citizenship. He studied for his law degree at the University of Lausanne where he finished in 1986 and was called to bar in 1991. He began his judicial career as a clerk at the Court of Entremont before being appointed investigative judge for central Valais in 1992.

== Political career ==
His political career began in 2005, when he was elected to the Valais Grand Council and was re-elected in 2009 and 2013. He served as the head of UDC group in the Grand Council. He became a member of the Municipal Council of Savièse in 2009 and served concurrently as Grand Council member until 2015 when he left both councils following his election to the National Council. In 2015 he was part of an initiative to launch Pegida France alongside Pierre Cassen, Renaud Camus and Melanie Dittmer of the German Pegida. At the National Council, he was appointed to the Political Institution Commission (CIP) in his first term and appointed to Security Policy Commission after his re-election in 2019. His legislative interest focuses on immigration and army. In 2017, he voted to ban use of niqab (full face covering) worn by Muslim women. Same year, he supported an immigration law seeking to introduce stringent conditions for third generation immigrants especially those with Muslim backgrounds to obtain Swiss citizenship. He was a member of referendum committee that opposed gay marriage in 2021. He also opposed the COVID certificate legislation that year.

He is the president of ProTell, a gun-rights advocacy group.

== Racism conviction ==
After a shooting attack in front of a mosque in Saint-Gall in 2014, Addor wrote on his Facebook and Twitter handles “On en redemande!” (let's have more). He was charged with incitement to violence by the state and defended his comment as a form of irony. He was convicted of racial discrimination and incitement to violence in 2017. His appeal against the judgement of the lower court failed as the highest court affirmed his conviction with a fine of $19,600.
