= Karim Ouchikh =

French politician

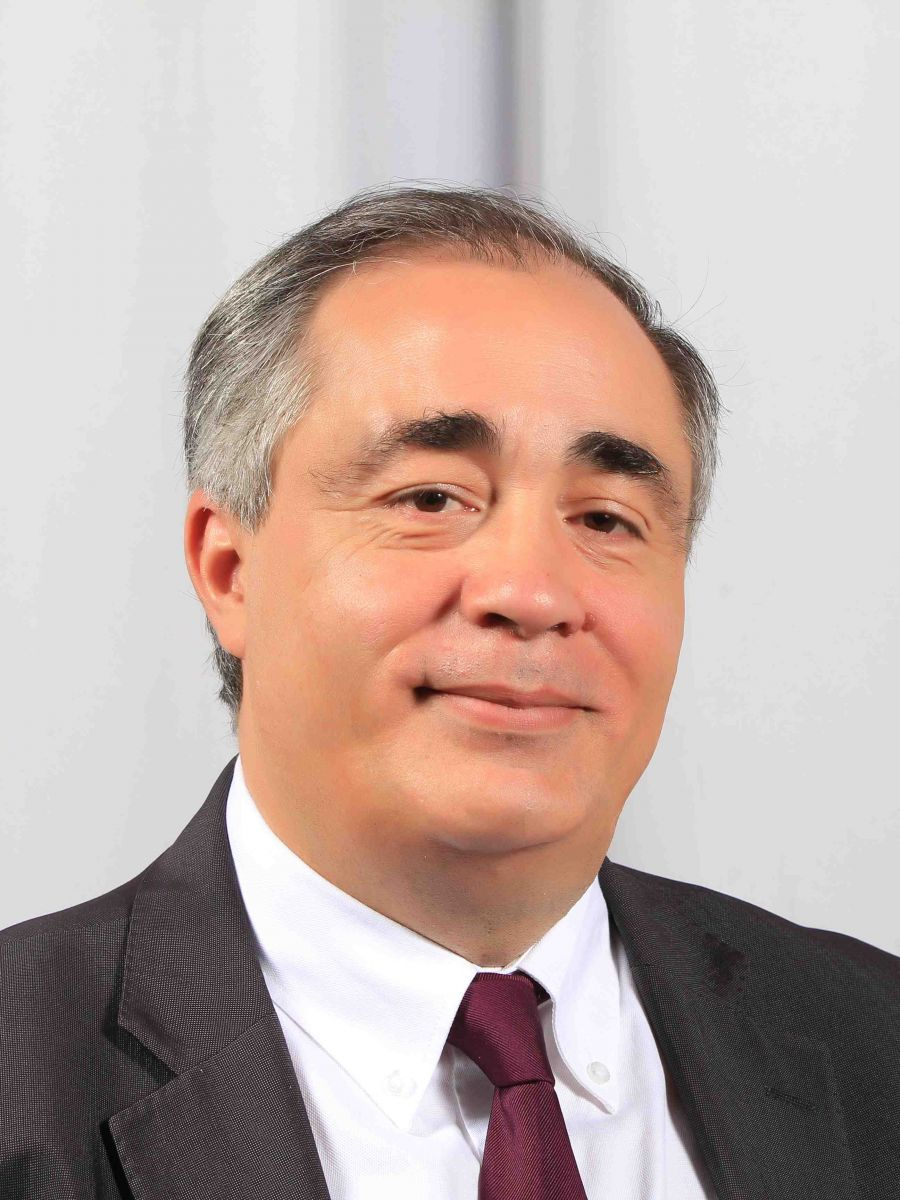
- Ouchikh in 2015

Vice President of the National Council of European Resistance
- Incumbent
- Assumed office 2017
- President: Renaud Camus

Personal details
- Born: 13 March 1965 (age 61) Saint-Maurice, France
- Party: Sovereignty, Identity and Freedoms (2011–present)
- Other political affiliations: Socialist Party (1995–2005); Rassemblement for the Independence and Sovereignty of France (2008–2011)
- Profession: Lawyer

Karim Ouchikh (born 13 March 1965) is a French politician. He is the current vice-president of the National Council of European Resistance, a far-right pan-European political group.

Elected vice-president of the Rally for the Independence and Sovereignty of France (RIF) in 2008, he participated in 2011 in the foundation of Sovereignty, Identity and Freedoms (SIEL), of which he has been the president since 2014. Ouchikh is a prominent Roman Catholic convert from Islam in France.

== Biography ==
=== Origins ===
Karim Ouchikh was born into a modest family of Algerian Berber origin that had settled in France in the 1960s. His father was a miller and his mother a housekeeper. He grew up on a housing estate in the suburbs of Gonesse.

In 1990, he registered in the Bar Association and was one of the lawyers defending the victims of the Concorde accident in Gonesse in 2000.

=== First steps on the left ===
In 1995, Ouchikh joined the Socialist Party and became a member of the municipal government of deputy mayor Jean-Pierre Blazy. However, Ouchikh disagreed with the left on European and social questions, and he left the SP in the mid-2000s, after sustained at the 2005 congress the motion for a left alternative.

=== Evolution to the right ===
In 2008, Ouchikh joined the Rassemblement for the Independence and Sovereignty of France (RIF), of which he became vice-president, and participated in the creation of the party Sovereignty, Identity and Freedoms in 2011. After the resignation of Paul-Marie Coûteaux in 2014, he was elected acting president of the SIEL. Finally, on 25 October, a new Congress elected him president. He is a director of the Rassemblement bleu Marine and a cultural advisor to the president of Front National.

Regarding the presidential election of 2017, Ouchikh "supports the candidacy of Marine Le Pen while watching with kindness Renaud Camus", and also supported Jean-Frédéric Poisson, president of the Christian Democratic Party, in the Republican presidential primary.

However, denouncing "the hegemonic will of Florian Philippot", the SIEL ended its alliance with the FN in the Rassemblement bleu Marine in November 2016.

He is also a councillor and agglomeration of Gonesse and a regional councillor of Île-de-France.

The administrative court of Cergy-Pontoise invalidated his municipal campaign accounts on 27 October 2014 for late justification of certain invoices. The State Council invalidated the decision in December 2016, allowing the reimbursement of his campaign expenses.

In 2017, Ouchikh was a candidate in the ninth district of Val-d'Oise. He finished 13th with 0.68% of the votes.

In 2019, he ran with Renaud Camus for the European parliament elections: "we shall not leave Europe, we shall make Africa leave Europe," as they wrote to define their agenda.

=== Religious beliefs ===
A member of a poor Muslim family, Ouchikh converted to Catholicism during the pontificate of Pope John Paul II, after being touched by the faith of the participants in World Youth Day in 1997. Baptized by Father Philippe Dorizon, he received confirmation from Mgr Jean-Yves Riocreux. He claims to have acquired during his catechumen "an indispensable spiritual teaching" but also to have discovered "a Christian civilization of which [he] did not suspect until very recently the infinite wealth of".

In September 2016, he founded the SOS Churches of France association, intended to fight for the defense of the Christian heritage of France.
