= Martial Bild =

French politician and journalist (born 1961)

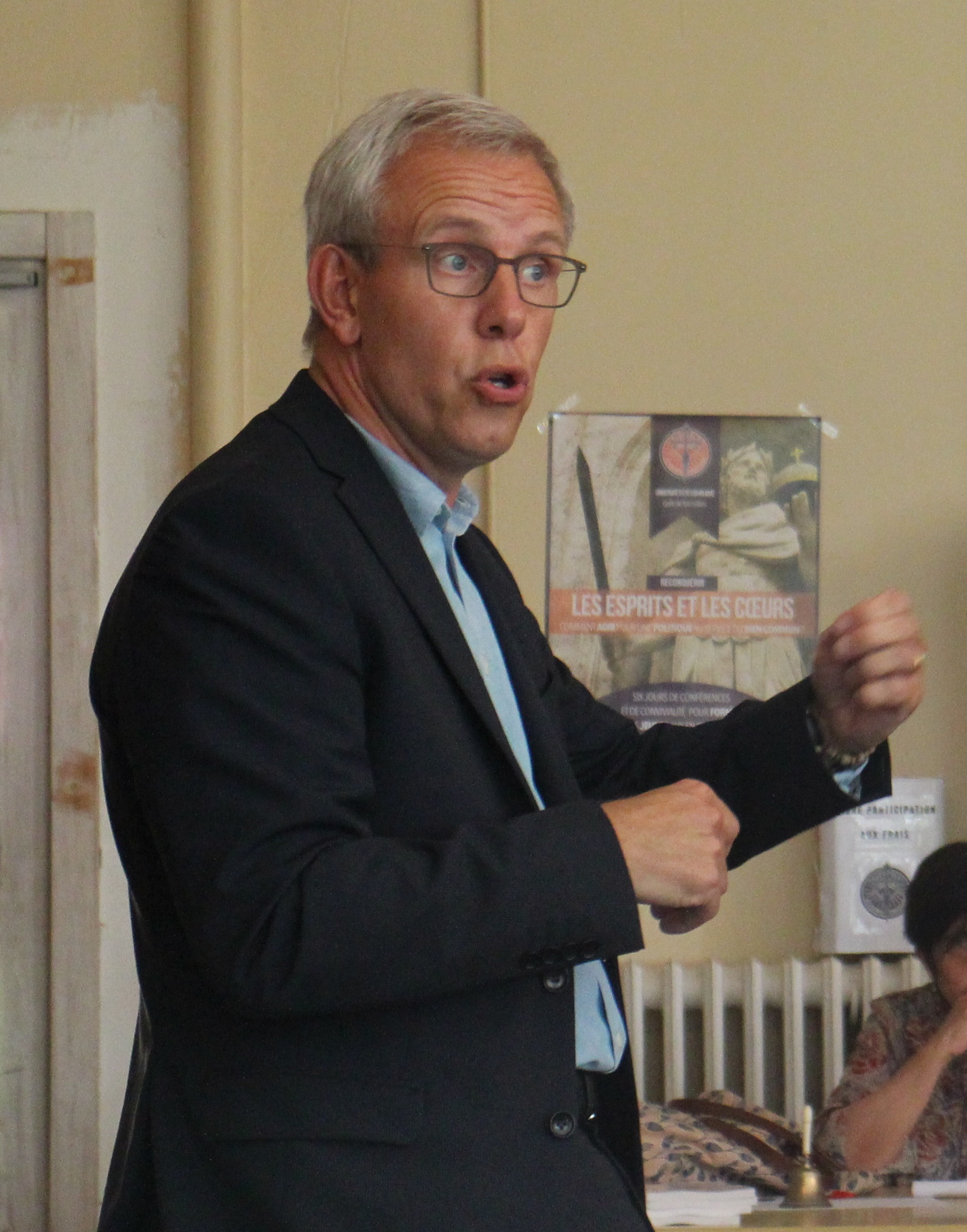
- Martial Bild in 2017

Member of the Regional council of Île-de-France
- In office 1992–2010
- President: Michel Giraud; Jean-Paul Huchon

Personal details
- Born: 12 November 1961 (age 64) Paris, France
- Party: PFN (1979–1981); National Front (1980–2008); PDF (2009–)
- Education: Lycée Carnot
- Alma mater: Panthéon-Sorbonne University; Institut Catholique de Paris
- Occupation: Journalist

Martial Bild (born 12 November 1961) is a French journalist and politician. A leading member of the National Front until 2008, he co-founded the Party of France in 2009, and the web television TV Libertés in 2014.

== Biography ==
Born in 1961, Martial Bild was member of the Party of New Forces between 1979 and 1981, and joined the National Front (FN) in 1980. He studied history at Tolbiac university but dropped out, then obtained a DEUG in history at the Institut catholique de Paris.

In 1986 Bild became the president of the Front National de la Jeunesse and was elected to the FN political bureau. In 1992, he was elected as a FN regional counselor for Île-de-France.

In 2000, Bild was the secretary of the FN federation of Paris. In January 2009, following the election of Marine Le Pen as the new head of the FN and after he had supported her rival Bruno Gollnisch, he announced his departure from the party to co-found with Carl Lang the Party of France. In 2014, he co-founded the YouTube channel TV Libertés.

== Views ==
He considers real equality "at the origin of ideologies dismissing democracy, and the source of misery and the Terror." On nationalism, he says that it is "not dangerous—there is not sentiment of hatred. On the contrary the rallying of peoples is good, emphasising the equality of men, and has nothing to do with hating other people. Rather, the nation is fundamental and natural." He belongs to the "national-catholic" wing of the far-right and is opposed to French laws on abortion.
