= André Couteaux =

French writer and scenarist

- Born: 1925; Ankara
- Died: 1985 (aged 59–60); Paris, France
- Occupation: Novelist
- Writing career
- Language: French

André Couteaux (1925 – 1985) was a French writer and a scenarist.

== Biography ==
He was married to Béatrice de Cambronne, the daughter of Claude de Cambronne, with whom he had a son, Stanislas Couteaux. He was born in Ankara. He is the father of politician Paul-Marie Couteaux. He lived in Damville for more than ten years.

== Books ==
- Un monsieur de compagnie, 1961,
  - English translation: Couteaux, André. Gentleman in Waiting. Boston: Houghton Mifflin, 1963. OCLC 1285441 (in over 100 libraries)
  - Dutch translation: Couteaux, André, and G.L.A. Neijenhuis. Een heer van gezelschap. Baarn: De Boekerij, 1970. OCLC 64603306
  - German translation Couteaux, André. Man muss nur zu leben wissen: Roman. Reinbek b. Hamburg: Rowohlt, 1971. OCLC 73676787
- L'Enfant à femmes, 1966
  - English translation, Couteaux, André. My Father's Keeper. Boston: Houghton Mifflin, 1968. OCLC 442977 (in over 140 libraries)
  - Dutch translation: Couteaux, André, and G.L.A. Neijenhuis. Vrouw gezocht voor vader en zoon. Briljant boeken. Amsterdam [etc.]: Boekerij, 1982.
  - German translation: Couteaux, André, and Elisabeth Stader. Frau für Vater und Sohn gesucht. [Hamburg]: Rowohlt, 1970.
  - Finnish translation: Couteaux, Andre, and Irmeli Sallamo. Miten isästä jälleen tuli onnellinen mies. Hki: Kirjayhtymä, 1970. OCLC 57854204
  - Spanish translation: Couteaux, André. El niño mujeriego. Barcelona: Plaza & Janes, 1968.
- Un homme, aujourd'hui, 1969
- Don Juan est mort, 1972
- La Guibre, Paris: J. Dullis, 1974. OCLC 3052128
- Le zigzagli. Julliard, 1973.

== Scenarii ==
- 1964 : Un monsieur de compagnie by Philippe de Broca
- 1969 : My Uncle Benjamin by Édouard Molinaro
