= Dominique Jamet =

French journalist and writer (born 1936)

Dominique Jamet (né Benjamin Jamet; born 16 February 1936, in Poitiers) is a French journalist, writer, and politician, best known for serving as the editor-in-chief of Le Quotidien de Paris from 1979 to 1987, serving as the president of Bibliothèque nationale de France from 1989 to 1994, and serving as the vice-president of Debout la France from 2013 to 2017. He is the uncle of politician France Jamet. He was invested with the Legion of Honour in 1995, the Ordre des Arts et des Lettres in 2008, and the Ordre des Palmes académiques in 2009.
