= Counter-jihad in France =

The counter-jihad movement in France consists of various organisations and individuals such as Riposte Laïque and Republican Resistance, led by Pierre Cassen and Christine Tasin respectively, Observatory on Islamisation, and other groups such as those founded by Alain Wagner. The movement has cooperated with the Bloc Identitaire, Daniel Pipes and the Middle East Forum, Stop Islamisation of Europe, and has organised events such as the "Apéro Géant: saucisson et pinard", a happy hour gathering of wine and deli meat cold cuts whose ingredients include pork.

== Riposte Laïque ==
Riposte Laïque ("Secular Retaliation") was founded by Pierre Cassen in 2007. Cassen has said his aim was to create a new web-based journal as a forum for the defence of secularism, particularly against the threat from Islam. Although the journal has a staff from a variety of political backgrounds, it is often portrayed as far-right. In 2023, the Global Project Against Hate and Extremism (GPAHE) released a report in which it classified Riposte Laïque as an "anti-muslim" and "conspiracy" group. It is very active publishing articles, videos on YouTube, and has a strong presence on social media. The group has faced an "overwhelming" number of lawsuits.

The group's most important event was the "Conference Against the Islamisation of our Countries" in 2010, which featured 24 international speakers, including Oskar Freysinger, Pascal Hilout, René Marchand, Tommy Robinson, Carl Pincemin, Christian Vanneste, Timo Vermeulen and Anne Zelensky.

== Republican Resistance ==
Christine Tasin speaking at a rally in 2015

The Republican Resistance (French: Résistance Républicaine) was founded in 2010 by Christine Tasin. She had previously collaborated with Riposte Laïque, and is in a relationship with its founder Pierre Cassen. In contrast to Riposte Laïque, the group functions more as a grassroots movement, although it also has an online presence. Tasin has been sentenced for inciting hatred against Muslims, and when she appealed her verdict, which she won, her legal costs were covered by the Middle East Forum.

== Observatory on Islamisation ==
The Observatory on Islamisation (French: Observatoire de l'Islamisation) is a counter-jihad website founded by Joachim Véliocas (born 1981) in 2007. He is an independent researcher who in 2006 published the first comprehensive study on the "Islamisation of France" in L'islamisation de la France, which analyzed Muslim associations and all the Islamist tendencies developing in France. In 2010 he published his second book, Ces Maires qui courtisent l'islamisme, which deals with the relations between politicians and Islamist associations, in particular the public funding that the latter obtain through electoral clientelism. He has later published three more books, respectively about radical mosques, the Muslim Brotherhood, and the church in the face of Islam. He has participated in Identitarian movement events.

== Alain Wagner ==
Jean-Michel Clément, better known as Alain Wagner, is a French counter-jihad activist who has been linked to several counter-jihad groups, including as the founder of L’Alliance FFL ("Alliance to Stop Sharia") and Vérité, Valeurs et Démocratie ("Truth, Values and Democracy") and as leader of Union de Défense des Citoyens et Contribuables ("Union of Defence of Citizens and Taxpayers").

Wagner became leader of the International Civil Liberties Alliance in 2012, making him "one of the most important figures in the European counter-jihadist scene". Before that, he was involved with the European Freedom Initiative group. He has attended several meetings and conferences of the Organization for Security and Cooperation in Europe (OSCE). He has also participated in rallies in support of Tommy Robinson, and international counter-jihad conferences. He held a speech at the international counter-jihad demonstration in Aarhus, Denmark in 2012. He has cooperated with both Riposte Laïque and Republican Resistance.
