= Janice Atkinson =

British politician

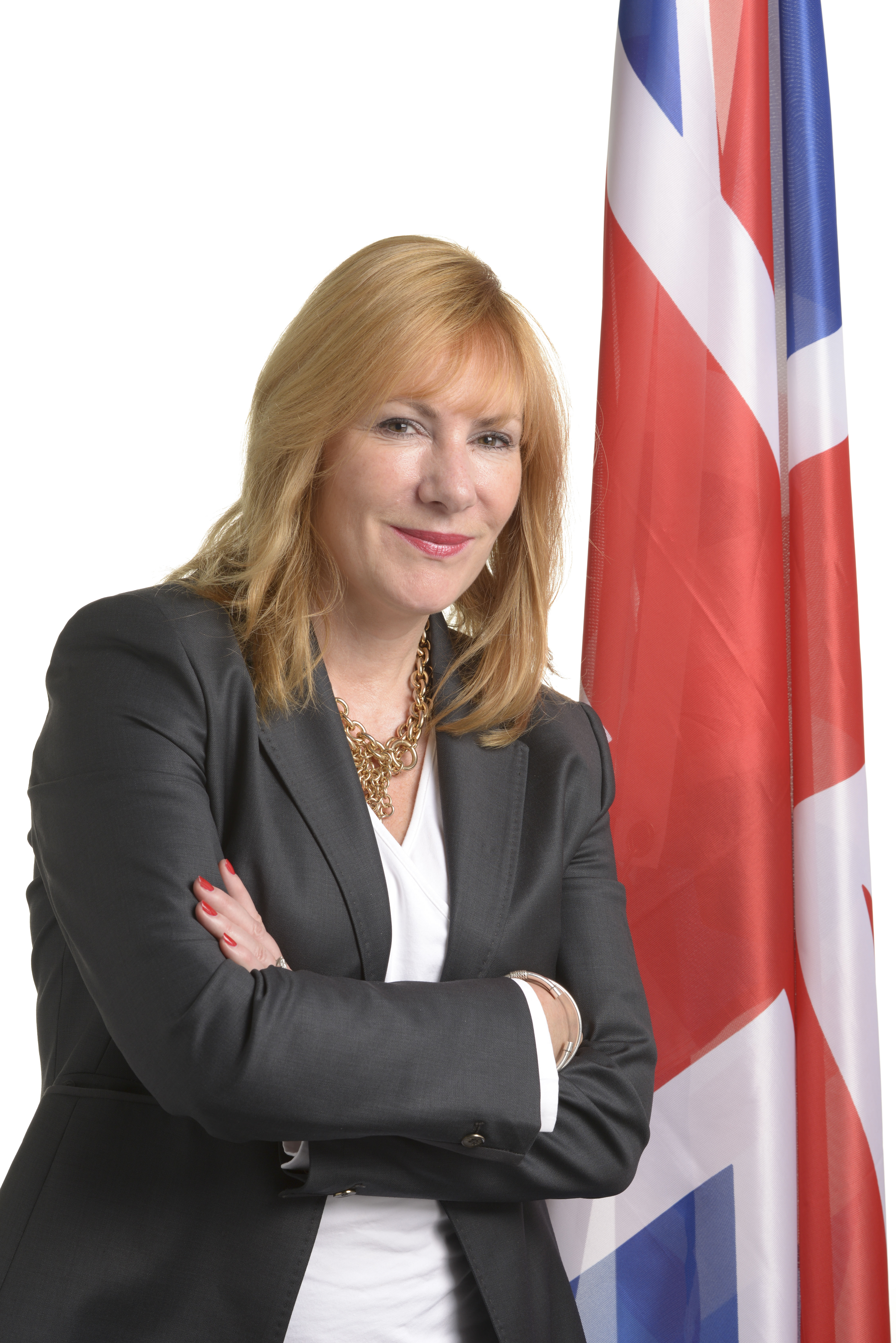

Member of the European Parliament for South East England
- In office 1 July 2014 – 1 July 2019
- Preceded by: Marta Andreasen

Personal details
- Born: 31 August 1962 (age 64) London, England
- Party: Independent (2015–present)
- Other political affiliations: National Council of European Resistance; UK Independence Party (2011–2015); Conservative Party (circa 1980 (‘’claimed’’) – 2011) (active 2005–2011)
- Spouse(s): Steve Small (div.), Simon
- Children: 2
- Website: janiceatkinson.co.uk European Parliament biography

Janice Ann Atkinson (born 31 August 1962) is a British former politician who was a Member of the European Parliament for the South East England region. She formerly represented the UK Independence Party (UKIP) and later sat as an independent: she was elected in 2014, second on the list for the region behind Nigel Farage. In March 2015, she was expelled from UKIP for "bringing the party into disrepute" after her chief of staff was recorded trying to fraudulently inflate her expenses.

== Political career ==
Atkinson is a former member of the Conservative Party and ran a marketing business for two decades prior to becoming an MEP. As Janice Small, she was a press officer for the Conservatives in the south-east during the 2005 general election and in the 2010 general election, she was the Conservative candidate for Batley and Spen, finishing second, 4,406 votes behind Labour incumbent Mike Wood. She was also director of Conservative Action for Electoral Reform.

Atkinson joined UKIP in 2011, citing David Cameron's failure to produce a referendum on European Union membership. As Janice Atkinson-Small she wrote a column for the Daily Mail.

She was selected as the UKIP candidate for Folkestone and Hythe for the 2015 general election, before being expelled from the party and withdrawn as its candidate due to a 'serious financial irregularity'.

On 16 June 2015, it was announced that Atkinson had joined the newly formed far-right group in the European Parliament, Europe of Nations and Freedom (ENF).

Atkinson is an associate of the American Legislative Exchange Council (ALEC).

Atkinson campaigned for Brexit. She also asked Home Secretary Sajid Javid to make it mandatory for the Union Jack to be displayed at ports and airports; Javid refused the request.

Atkinson did not stand in the 2019 European Parliament elections.

== Political views ==
Atkinson's political publications include: Migrant Crime Wave: The EU Cover Up Revealed, Beyond Brussels: Brexit and The New European Patriotism and What Women Want versus The gender, transgender and cultural wars of the West.

In the aftermath of the Manchester Arena bombing in May 2017, Atkinson called for the reintroduction of the death penalty for those convicted of terrorist crimes.

On 1 March 2018 Atkinson was one of three UK MEPs who voted against a motion to encourage national parliaments to ban "gay conversion therapies".

In August 2018 Atkinson called on Home Secretary Sajid Javid to fly the Union Jack at ports and airports; the request was refused.

== Controversies ==
During the 2014 campaign it emerged that despite Atkinson's claims – and status as a champion of state selective education – her alma mater, Blackheath Bluecoat School, is not and has never been a grammar school.

It was also reported that, before she joined UKIP, Atkinson was dropped from the 2011 alternative vote campaign following a meeting with undecided Conservatives in which she mentioned "her support for elements of" the British National Party's platform. A few days later Atkinson swore at anti-racism campaigners. The incident followed her call for 'abusive' anti-UKIP protestors to be arrested by the police. A photo capturing the moment was widely reported and went viral on social media. Atkinson, who has described towns in Kent as 'no-go areas' as a result of Eastern European immigration, has defended her position, claiming she marched as part of the Anti-Nazi League in her youth.

In August 2014 she issued an apology after being recorded by a BBC News crew referring to the Thai (or Thai-born) wife of a constituent, who were both UKIP supporters, as "a ting-tong from somewhere", a term used in Thailand for people with mental health problems. The woman and her husband threatened to withdraw from UKIP membership but changed their mind following a personal apology from UKIP leader Nigel Farage. Interviewed on camera later at their home, the woman and her husband said that Atkinson hadn't apologised to them and was belligerent when speaking to them on the phone; the husband remarked that "She was quite forthright in pointing out what a lovely lady she is." Whilst speaking of Atkinson, Farage said "99% of UKIP members aren't like that and don't hold those views". Atkinson apologised and explained in an interview shortly after that she never meant any malice and the unintended comment was taken out of context.

In December 2014 it was revealed that Atkinson, whose annual salary as an MEP was around £79,000 per year, owed more than £2,000 in unpaid child support. Her ex-husband claimed this had "caused major hardship for her son and for her family". Atkinson was singled out for criticism as she had previously attacked "feckless families" who have more children than they can afford.

=== Expenses fraud and expulsion from UKIP ===
On 19 March 2015 Atkinson was suspended from the party following "allegations of a serious financial nature". The Sun published a secret recording in which Atkinson's chief of staff, Christine Hewitt, spoke to a staff member at a restaurant in Margate and asked them for a fraudulent invoice, inflating the bill to over three times the cost of the £950 meal. On the recording Hewitt was heard to say "we overcharge them slightly, because that's the way we repatriate it". The following day the police were reported to be investigating.

On 23 March Atkinson was expelled from UKIP for "bringing the party into disrepute". No legal action was taken against Atkinson, but Hewitt pled guilty to fraud and was given a suspended sentence. Atkinson was cleared of all allegations by the Kent Police and no further action was taken against her.

== Personal life ==
Atkinson was previously married to Steve Small, with whom she had two sons. Small, who was granted custody of the children following their divorce, criticised Atkinson in 2014 for falling behind on her child support payments. She was taken to court twice by the Child Support Agency to force her to pay what she owed.

Her current husband, Simon, is a banker. In March 2019, she revealed that she had been diagnosed with cancer of the tonsils.
