= Oskar Freysinger =

Swiss politician (born 1960)

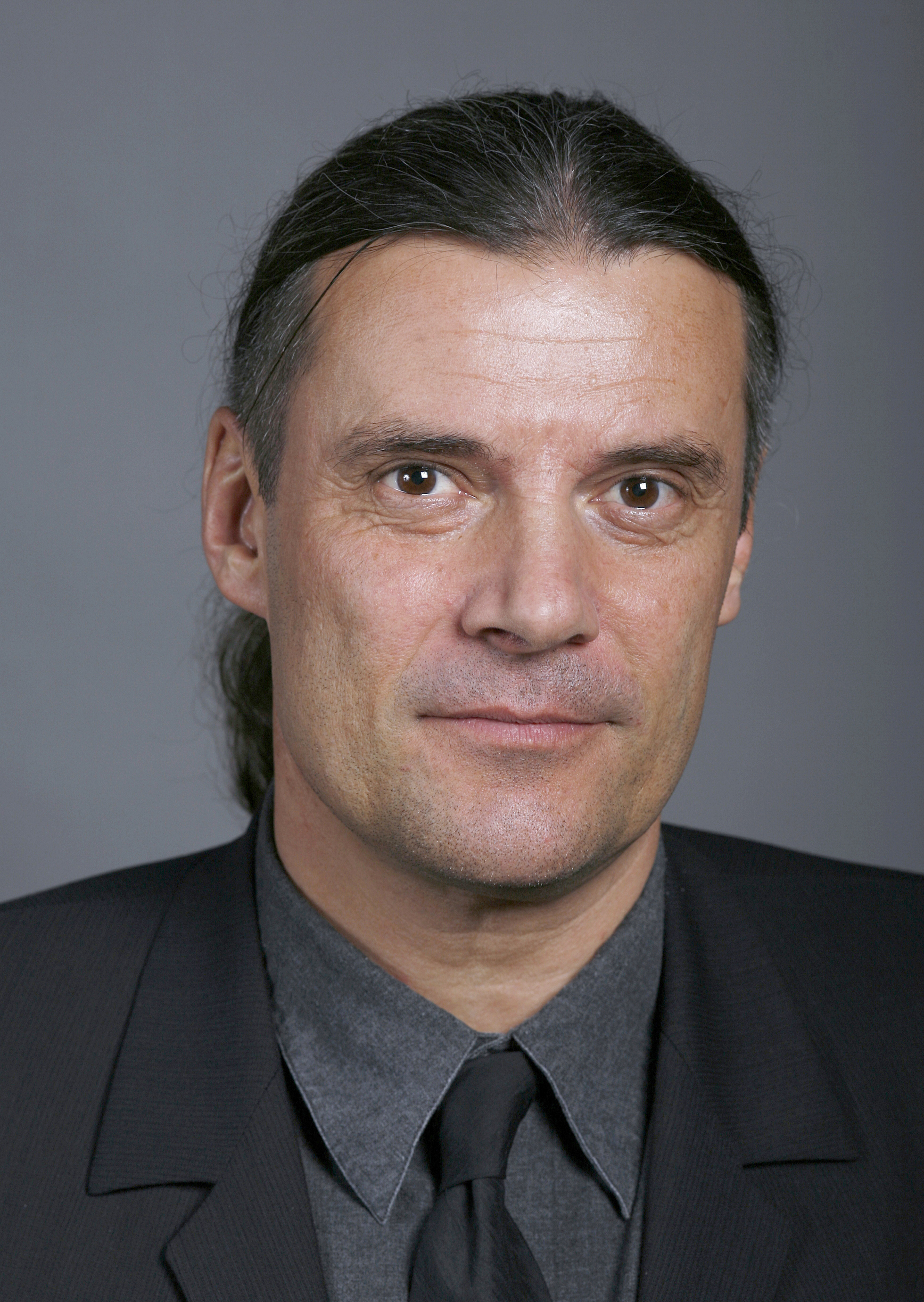
- Freysinger at the 2011 Geneva Salon du Livre

Member of the National Council of Switzerland Parliament for Valais
- In office 1 December 2003 – 29 November 2015

Personal details
- Born: 12 June 1960 (age 66) Sierre, Switzerland
- Party: Swiss People's Party
- Spouse: Ghislaine Héritier
- Children: 3
- Education: University of Fribourg
- Occupation: Author; politician; teacher

Military service
- Rank: Appointé

Oskar Freysinger (born 12 June 1960) is a Swiss author and former politician for the Swiss People's Party, who served as a member of the National Council of Switzerland from 2003 to 2015 and as

== Background ==
Freysinger was born in Sierre. He studied at a German-speaking school in Sion, and later studied German literature and philosophy, and French literature, obtaining a teaching degree in 1985. He studied at the University of Fribourg. He has taught at the Lycée-Collège de la Planta since 1987. He is married to Ghislaine Héritier and has three children.

== Political career ==
From 1997 and 2001, Freysinger was a communal counselor at Savièse for the Christian Democratic People's Party of Switzerland. He co-founded the Valaisan branch of the Swiss People's Party (SVP), which he headed from 1999 to 2002. He became a member of the cantonal parliament of Valais from 2001 to 2003, and of the National Council of Switzerland from 2003 until 2015.

His main proposals include the revocation of article 261 bis; hold naturalisation by popular vote; expulsion of foreigners convicted of crimes; and strict regulation of drugs. He has been considered "a leading anti-Muslim and anti-Islamic figure on the European scene".

Freysinger played a crucial role in the 2009 Swiss minaret referendum to ban Islamic mosque minarets, and he participated in a counter-jihad conference in Paris in 2010. He has also been on the board of advisors of the counter-jihad organisation Stop Islamization of Nations (SION). He sees Islam as essentially a political religion and therefore subject to secular law.

In March 2013, Freysinger was elected to the State Council of Valais, the cantonal executive where he led the department of education and Security until 2017 when he lost reelection, becoming the first State Councillor losing reelection in Valais in 80 years

Also in 2013, apart from becoming vice-president of the SVP, Freysinger was involved in a scandal concerning him keeping a German Reich war flag in his basement.

After not seeking reelection to the National Council in 2015 and losing reelection to the Valais State Council in 2017, Freysinger made a quiet exit from the spotlight, writing to a journalist: "I no longer exist".

Behind the scenes, Freysinger continued in politics, continuing to serve as vice-president of the SVP until 2018 and coordinating his party's campaign in the french-speaking part of Switzerland for the 2019 federal elections.

In 2021, an interview with Freysinger was blocked from Facebook due to it containing conspiracy-theories concerning COVID-19 and vaccines.

== Bibliography ==
- Brüchige Welten. Kurzgeschichten, Parabeln, Satiren. Rotten, Visp 2004, ISBN 3-907624-60-2
- Outre-pensées. Matze, Sion 2005, ISBN 2-940375-00-3
- Die Schachspirale. Roman. Matze, Sion 2006, ISBN 2-940375-02-X
- Le nez dans le soleil. Monologue. Matze, Sion 2009, ISBN 978-2-940375-07-3
- Under Pseudonym Janus: Canines: antipolar. Xenia éditions, Sion 2010, ISBN 978-2-88892-103-5
- Antifa. Petit manuel antifasciste. Tatamis, Paris 2011, ISBN 978-2-917617-14-4
- Löwenzahn oder Der alte Mann an der Suone. Weltbild, Olten 2012, ISBN 978-3-03812-442-9
- Wabers Schwarm. Weltbild, Olten 2012, ISBN 978-3-03812-470-2
- Bergfried. Brinkhaus, Horw 2017, ISBN 978-3-906900-11-7
- Die dunkle Seite des Lichts. Brinkhaus, Horw 2018, ISBN 978-3-906900-12-4
- Rote Asche. Roman. Brinkhaus, Horw 2018, ISBN 978-3-906900-20-9
- Übung allein macht keinen Meister. Brinkhaus, Horw 2019, ISBN 9783906900209
- Nachtwehen. Ein Briefroman Brinkhaus, Horw 2019, ISBN 978-3-906900-23-0
- Waterman: A Sandy Tale. Wipf and Stock 2022, ISBN 9781666731781
- Svalbard. Roman Brinkhaus, Horw 2023, ISBN 978-3-906900-31-5
