= Paul-Marie Coûteaux =

French politician

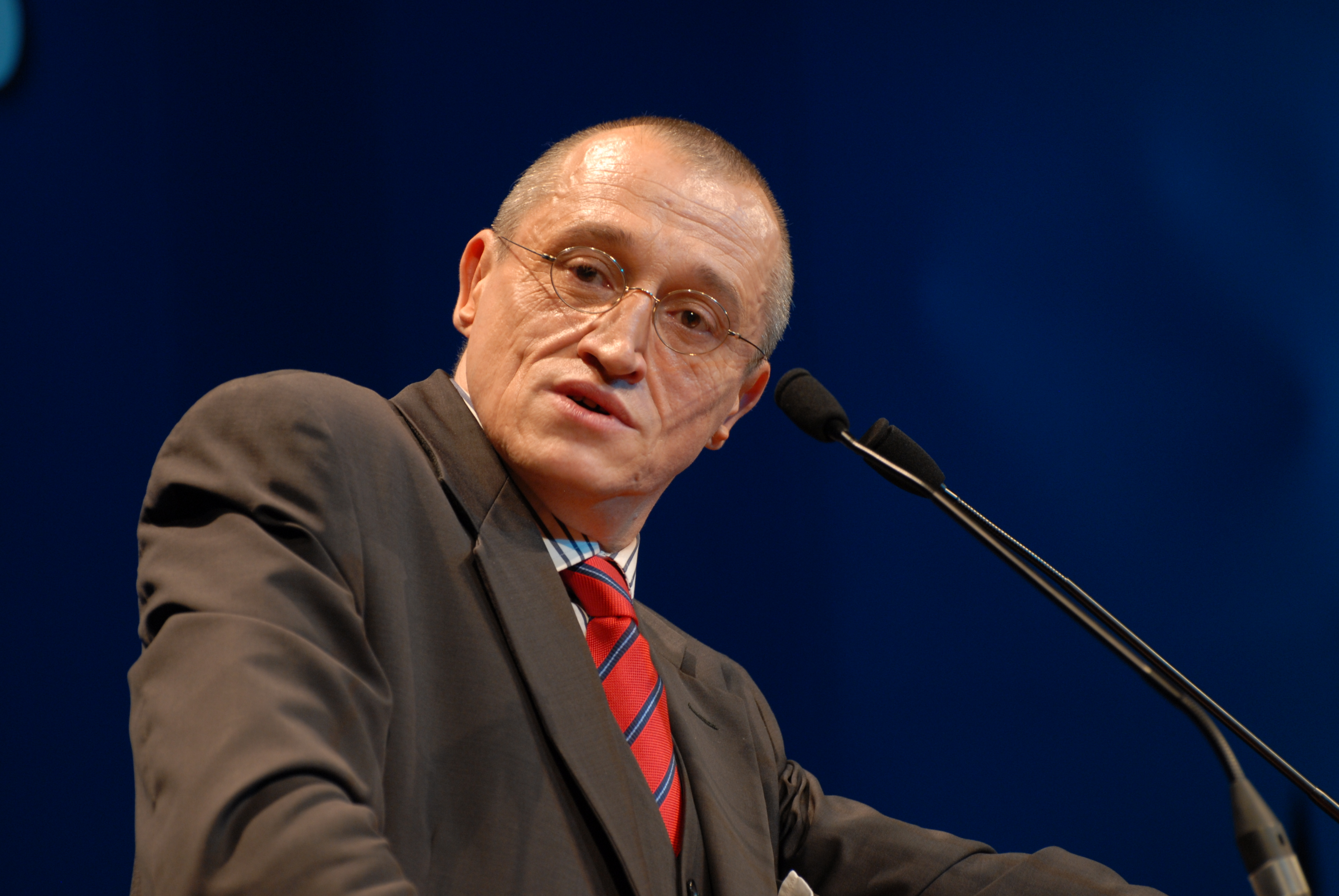
- Paul-Marie Coûteaux in Toulouse in April 2007

Member of the European Parliament for Île-de-France
- In office 1999–2009

Paul-Marie Coûteaux (born 31 July 1956, in Paris) is a French politician and author. He served as a Member of the European Parliament from 1999 to 2009 for the Movement for France, and a member of Via since 2018

== Early life ==
Paul-Marie Coûteaux was born on 31 July 1956. He graduated from the École nationale d'administration. In a Gay nightclub, Coûteaux discovered Gaullism.

== Family ==
Descending from Mathieu Coûteaux, bailiff and receiver of Claude Lamoral II, Prince of Ligne House of Ligne and the barony of Belœil, he is the son of writer and scenarist André Couteaux and the brother of Stanislas Coûteaux, founder with Géraldine Becq de Fouquières, of the real estate agency, Book-A-Flat.

== Career ==
Coûteaux was an assistant to Michel Jobert from 1981 to 1983, Philippe de Saint Robert from 1984 to 1987, Jean-Pierre Chevènement from 1988 to 1991, Boutros Boutros-Ghali from 1991 to 1993, Philippe Séguin to the French National Assembly from 1993 to 1996.

Coûteaux served as a Member of the European Parliament (MEP) for Île-de-France from 1999 to 2009. He was a member of the Mouvement pour la France, and a member of the Bureau of the Independence and Democracy. He served on the European Parliament's Committee on Foreign Affairs.

He founded the Sovereignty, Identity and Freedoms (SIEL) party in 2011 in the run-up to the 2012 elections.

Coûteaux joined Reconquête in 2022.

== Works ==
- Clovis, une histoire de France, Lattès, 1996 ISBN 978-2709616799
- L'Europe vers la guerre, Michalon, 1997 ISBN 978-2841860791
- Traité de savoir disparaître à l'usage d'une vieille génération, Michalon, 1998 ISBN 978-2841860814
- La Puissance et la Honte : trois lettres françaises, Michalon, 1999 ISBN 978-2841861071
- De Gaulle philosophe : le génie de la France, tome 1, Lattès, 2002 ISBN 978-2709620673
- Un petit séjour en France, Bartillat, 2003 ISBN 978-2841002986
- Ne laissons pas mourir la France (avec Nicolas Dupont-Aignan), Albin Michel, 2004 ISBN 978-2226142177
- Être et parler français, Perrin, 2006 ISBN 978-2262023362
- De Gaulle philosophe : la colère du peuple, tome 2, Lattès, 2010 ISBN 9782709626835
- De Gaulle, espérer contre tout : lettre ouverte à Régis Debray, Xenia, 2010 ISBN 978-2888921080
