= 2024–2025 German protests against right-wing extremism =

Protests in response to the 2023 Potsdam meeting

2024-2025 German Protests against Rightwing Extremism
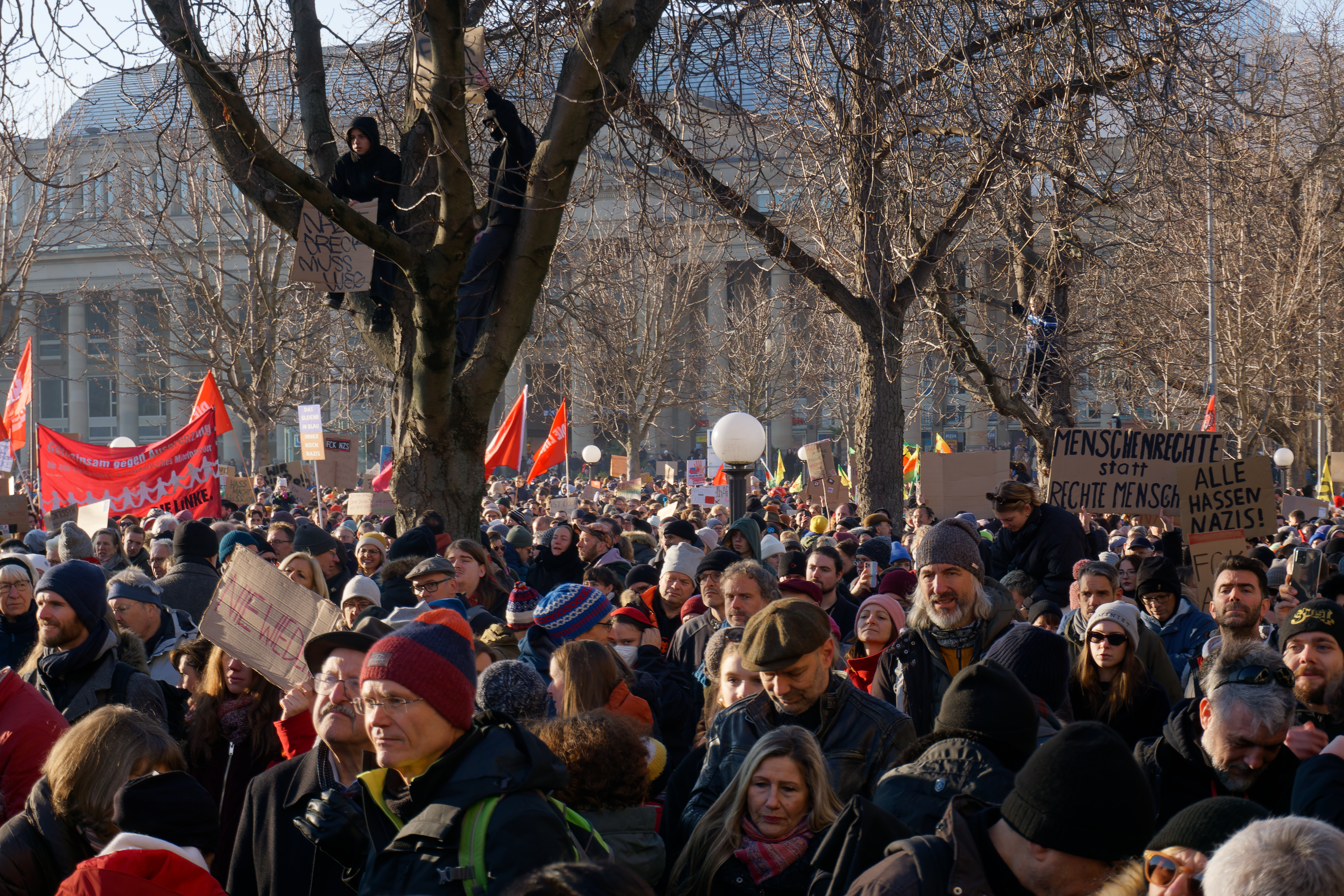
- Protests in Stuttgart, 20 January 2024
- Date: 13 January 2024 – present (2 years, 10 months and 3 days)
- Location: Germany
- Caused by: 2023 Potsdam far-right meeting
- Goals: Investigation or banning of the Alternative for Germany
- Methods: Political demonstration, nonviolent resistance
- Status: Protests ended by mid-2024; new wave of protests began in early 2025

In early 2024, widespread protests against the far-right Alternative for Germany (AfD) party took place in Germany, after a report by investigative journalist group Correctiv revealed the presence of in-office party members at the meeting of rightwing extremists at Potsdam in 2023, centered on "remigration" proposals to organize mass deportations of foreign-born Germans, including those with German citizenship. Protesters have "sought", as declared by the organizers, to defend the German democracy from the AfD, with many protesters calling for the party to be investigated by the Federal Office for the Protection of the Constitution, or banned altogether. This wave of protests became the largest civil society protest movement of the postwar period. A second protest wave erupted in early 2025, shortly before the federal election held on 23 February, after Friedrich Merz and the CDU pushed through a proposal to tighten immigration policy with the AfD. This sparked outrage and demand for the Brandmauer to be upheld.

== Background ==
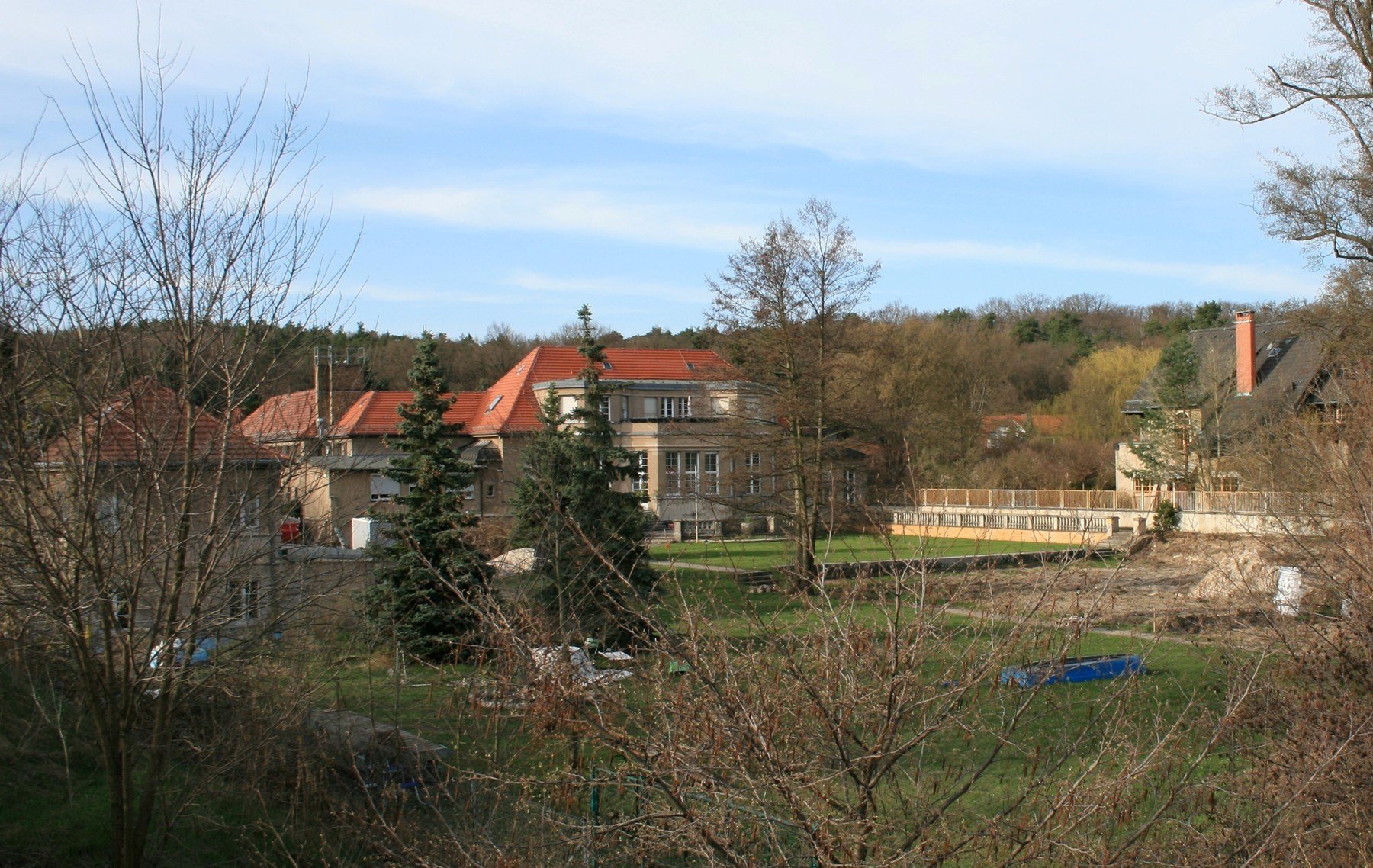
Adlon mansion, where AfD politicians and two CDU politicians met with followers of the Identitarian movement

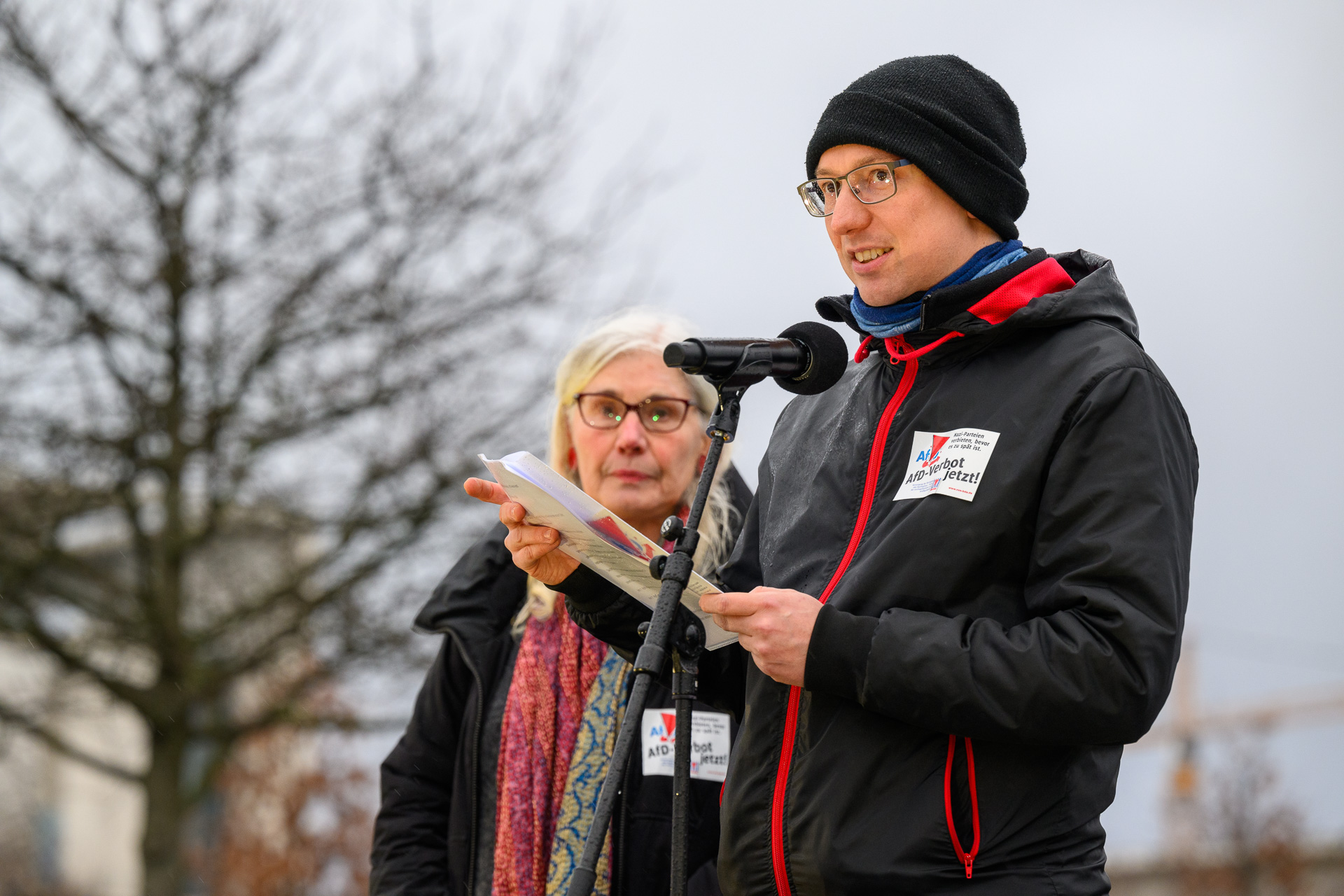
VVN-BdA chairpersons Cornelia Kerth and Florian Gutsche at the demonstration "Hand in hand against fascism" in Berlin on 3 February 2024

The Alternative for Germany (AfD) was established in 2013 as a right-wing eurosceptic party. It began gaining political power following the 2015 European migrant crisis, in which around one million migrants fleeing military conflicts during the Arab Winter were resettled in Germany. The AfD first entered the Bundestag in the 2017 German federal election, becoming the third-largest party behind the Christian Democrats (CDU/CSU) and Social Democratic Party (SPD). After a drop in the 2021 federal election, the AfD began to regain popularity after the Russian invasion of Ukraine in 2022, finding new appeal as the defender of the economically precarious class which struggled with the global energy crisis and cost inflation caused by the invasion. Political analysts saw the AfD as benefiting both from dissent within the ruling traffic light coalition about how to carry out the transformation of the country into a competitive digitized economy, and from attempts by the opposition party CDU/CSU to regain voters from the AfD themselves through adopting in particular a tougher stance on migration. By July 2023, the AfD was polling as the second-most popular political party in Germany at 20%, behind only the CDU. The same year, it also elected two officials for the first time in its history.

On 10 January 2024, investigative journalist group Correctiv published information revealing that members of the AfD had met Identitarian movement activists in the city of Potsdam, where plans to "remigrate" foreign-born Germans, including non-citizens as well as those with German citizenship, were proposed. The report gained massive traction in Germany, with critical comparisons being made to the 1940 Madagascar Plan to deport four million Jews; comparisons to the 1942 Wannsee Conference, at which the Final Solution was organized, were also circulating. The mentioning of the Wannsee Conference in the Correctiv report was criticized even though the report had not explicitly compared the two events. Minister of the Interior Nancy Faeser said that the Correctiv revelations had evoked memories of the conference, but that she did not want to equate the two events.

Many people and groups have called for the party to be banned, including historians and activist groups that date back to the aftermath of World War Two. Jens-Christian Wagner, head of the Buchenwald and Mittelbau-Dora Memorial Foundation in Thuringia said, "It cannot be that liberal democracy allows a party to participate in elections and finances its campaign that seeks to abolish liberal democracy". The VVN-BdA quoted Erich Kästner, "The events of 1933 to 1945 should have been fought by 1928 at the latest. Later, it was too late. We must not wait until the fight for freedom is called treason. We must not wait until the snowball has become an avalanche. We must crush the rolling snowball..." in a January 2024 call for a ban. Federal chairman of the VVN-BdA, Florian Gutsche, said "The revelation of the deportation plans has brought the AfD's inhumane ideology into the spotlight of public debate. However, these plans are not new. Its platform already clearly shows that it is a völkisch-nationalist party. Through party funding, the AfD has been providing state support to Nazis for years".

AfD leader Alice Weidel defended the party, saying that she had removed those involved in the meeting, and lambasted Correctiv journalists as "left-wing activists using Stasi methods". Two members of the conservative Values Union, a faction of the CDU, also attended the event, and following the backlash, the group's leader Hans-Georg Maaßen announced the movement was severing its ties with the CDU. The Values Union announced on 20 January that it would establish itself as a political party.

== Protests in 2024 ==
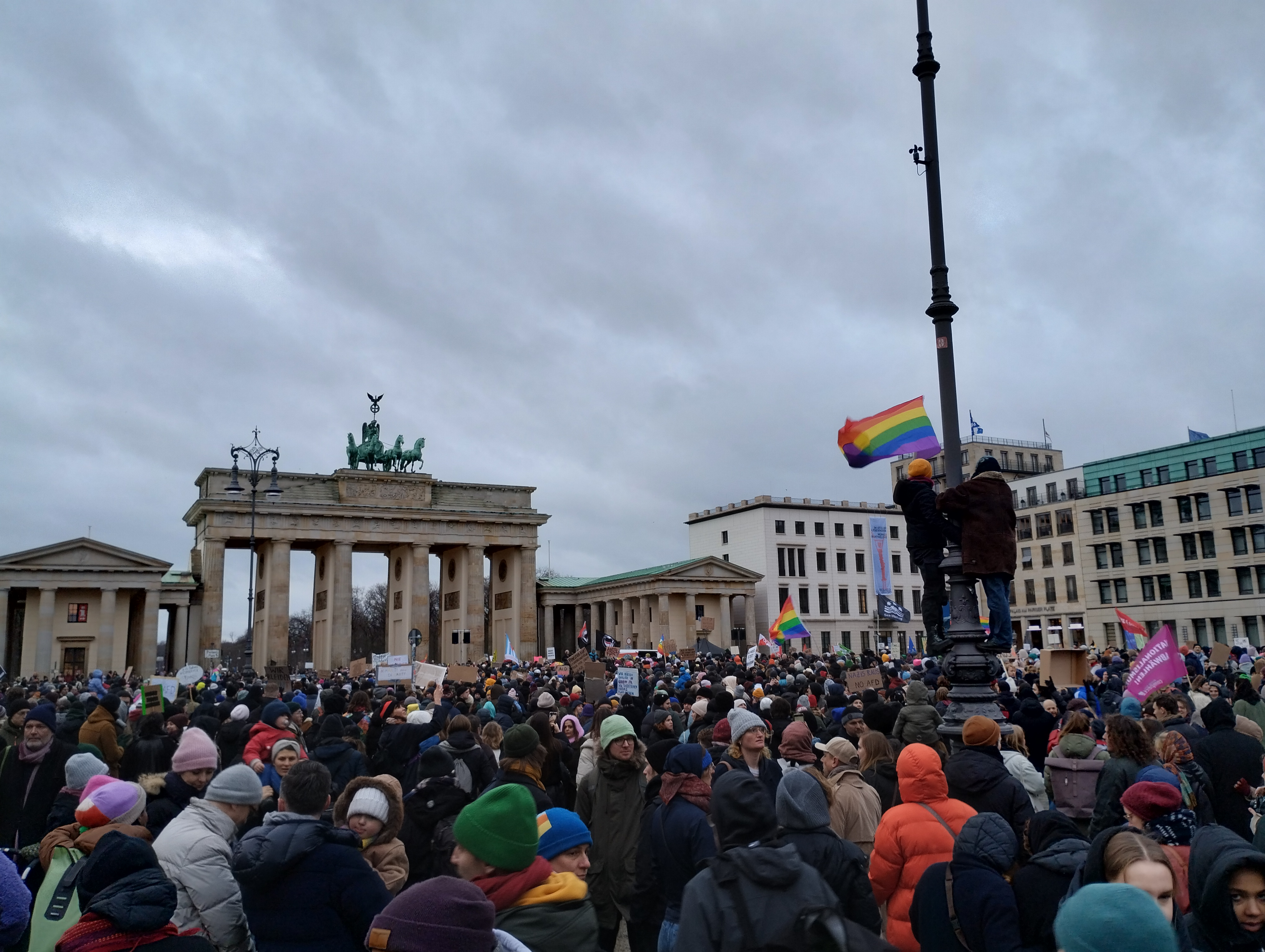
Protests in Berlin, 14 January 2024

After several smaller-scale protests, in the evening of 12 January 2024 around 2,000 protested against the AfD at its Hamburg headquarters. The next day, a rally in Duisburg against an AfD new year's reception attracted around 2,400 protesters according to police, far more than anticipated by organizers at the time of registering the rally with authorities, which was before the Correctiv revelations. Also on 13 January, around 650 protesters in Düsseldorf demanded the investigation of the AfD to examine the possibility of its prohibition. On 14 January, thousands protested in Potsdam and at Brandenburg Gate in Berlin. Among those present at the protests in Potsdam on 14 January were chancellor Olaf Scholz and Minister for Foreign Affairs Annalena Baerbock, both members of the Bundestag from the city. Interviewed by Deutsche Presse-Agentur, Baerbock said that the protesters were "for democracy and against old and new fascism," while Potsdam mayor Mike Schubert said that the remigration plans "are reminiscent of the darkest chapter of German history."

Protests continued to draw larger crowds throughout the week, including a protest in Cologne, in which around 30,000 people participated. Non-AfD politicians from across Germany's political spectrum expressed support for the protests, with Scholz writing on Twitter that "We won't allow anyone to distinguish the 'we' in our country based on whether someone has an immigration history or not," pro-business Free Democratic Party politician Christian Dürr directly comparing the AfD to the Nazi Party, Vice Chancellor Robert Habeck from the Green Party describing the protests as "impressive" for democracy, and CDU leader Friedrich Merz expressing that it was "very encouraging that thousands of people are demonstrating peacefully against right-wing extremism."

Various churches throughout Germany called on people to protest the AfD, as did coaches of the Bundesliga. Josef Schuster, President of the Central Council of Jews in Germany, described the protests as restoring Jews' faith in German democracy after it having been damaged following antisemitism during the Gaza war. The AfD was also condemned by several businesses, including Siemens, Evonik Industries, Infineon Technologies, and Düsseldorf Airport.

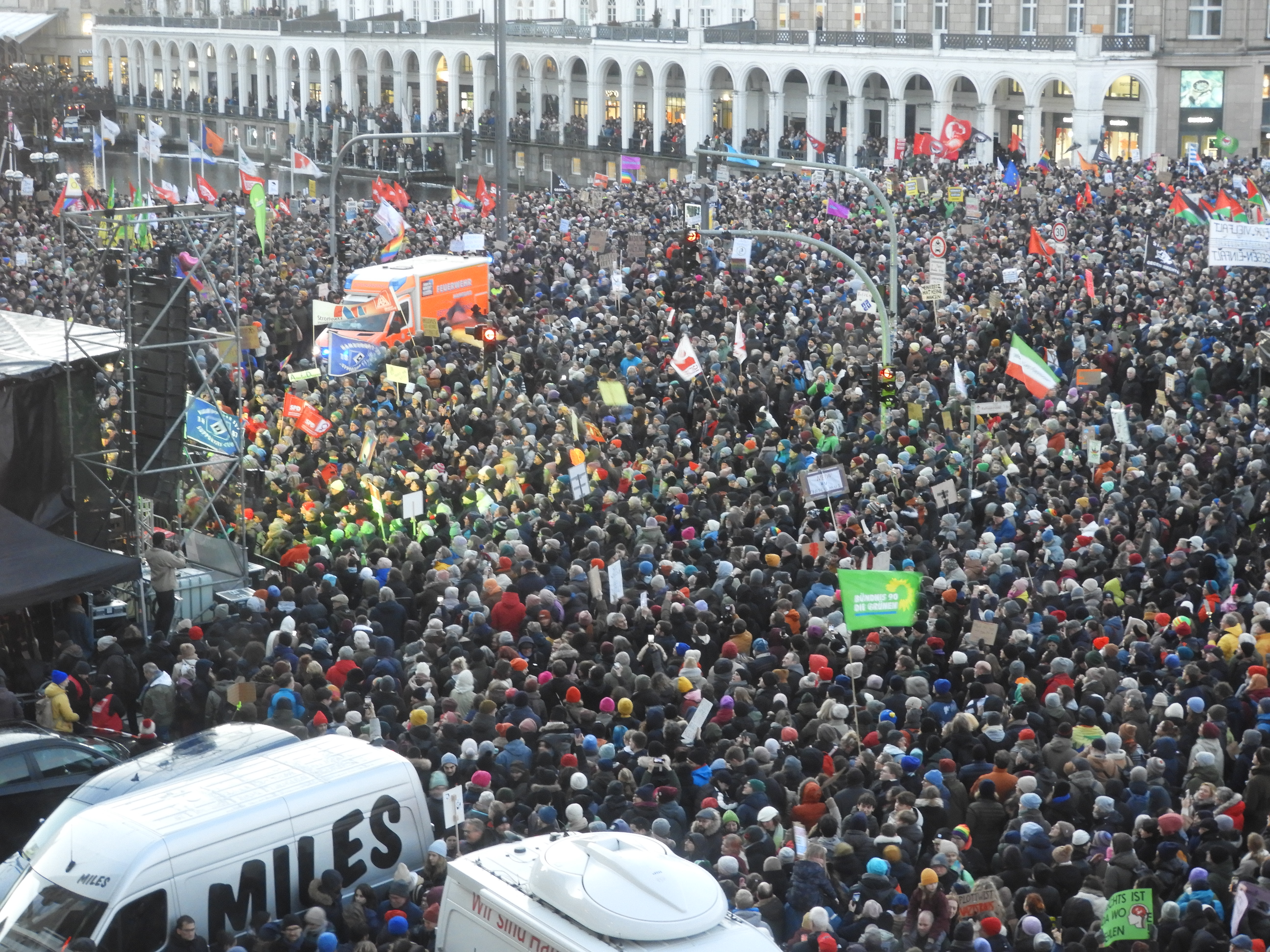
Protests in Hamburg, 19 January 2024

The size of the protests exceeded expectations by both police and the organizers; initial estimates of 50,000–80,000 people protesting in Hamburg on 19 January were increased in February 2024 by the city's interior authority to 180,000, after recalculation. Hamburg's mayor, Peter Tschentscher, spoke against the AfD at the protest, saying "We are the majority and we are strong, because we are united and we are determined not to let our country and our democracy be destroyed for a second time after 1945."

Between 19 and 21 January, protests reached a size of 1.4 million people, according to organizers Campact and Fridays for Future. A planned march in Munich was cancelled for safety concerns, as 100,000 people, four times the registered amount, had arrived for the protest, according to local police. Members of the German government urged protests to continue, with Scholz urging as many people as possible to come out for democracy.

The protest in Berlin on 3 February, attendance estimates of which ranged from 150,000 to 300,000 participants, was organized by a collective which included about 1,700 organizations from civil society, sports, and culture, as well as trade unions. The collective, which had formed before the Correctiv revelations, voiced its intent to continue the rallies for the longer term.

As part of the protests, various proposals to ban the AfD have been advocated, including from 25 members of the Bundestag from the SPD. Among those calling for the AfD to be banned is Saskia Esken, co-leader of the SPD. These proposals have been pushed back upon by others, notably Habeck and Merz, who have expressed concerns about the potential risks such a move could pose if unsuccessful. Some of Habeck's comments, however, have been publicly interpreted as expressing support for a ban as protests escalated, saying that the AfD intended to replace German democracy with a system similar to Russia under Vladimir Putin. Others, such as constitutional scholar Horst Meier, have argued that a ban, while possible, would be ill-advised as a result of the AfD's popularity. The AfD would be only the third such party banned nationally, after the Socialist Reich Party and the Communist Party of Germany, both of which were banned during the 1950s, though its branches in the states of Saxony, Saxony-Anhalt, and Thuringia have been declared as extremist. Minister of Interior Faeser has expressed support for a ban on the party, but only as a last resort.

Demonstrations with at least 25,000 participants
Date	Location	Participants
14 Jan	Berlin	25,000
16 Jan	Cologne	up to 30,000
19 Jan	Hamburg	180,000
20 Jan	Frankfurt am Main	40,000
20 Jan	Hannover	35,000
20 Jan	Dortmund	30,000
21 Jan	Munich	100,000–250,000
21 Jan	Berlin	over 100,000
21 Jan	Cologne	70,000
21 Jan	Leipzig	60,000–70,000
21 Jan	Bremen	40,000-45,000
21 Jan	Dresden	25,000–40,000
21 Jan	Freiburg im Breisgau	25,000
27 Jan	Düsseldorf	100,000
27 Jan	Osnabrück	25,000
28 Jan	Hamburg	60,000–100,000
30 Jan	Bielefeld	25,000
3 Feb	Berlin	150,000–300,000
3 Feb	Freiburg im Breisgau	over 30,000
3 Feb	Dresden	30,000
3 Feb	Augsburg	25,000
3 Feb	Nuremberg	25,000
11 Feb	Munich	75,000–100,000
16 Feb	Münster	30,000
25 Feb	Hamburg	60,000

=== List of protests ===
The following extendable table lists protests with at least 5,000 participants that occurred since 11 January 2024 following the report published by Correctiv. It also lists smaller protests that occurred on or before 19 January, on which day a protest in Hamburg attracted around 180,000 participants. The total number of protests from mid-January until April 2024 was counted by taz to be over 1,800, with around four million people attending in total.

List of demonstrations of at least 5000 participants (up to 17 March 2024)
Date	Location	Participants	Reported by
11 Jan	Berlin	several hundred	Die Zeit
11 Jan	Darmstadt	over 500	Frankfurter Rundschau
11 Jan	Potsdam	60	Tagesspiegel
12 Jan	Berlin	350	Tagesspiegel
12 Jan	Hamburg	2,000	Die Zeit, Norddeutscher Rundfunk
12 Jan	Mannheim	c.250	Südwestrundfunk
13 Jan	Duisburg	ca. 2,400	Die Zeit, Rheinische Post
13 Jan	Düsseldorf	650	Die Zeit, Rheinische Post
13 Jan	Landau	250–500	Die Rheinpfalz
14 Jan	Augsburg	700	Bayerischer Rundfunk
14 Jan	Berlin	25,000	Der Spiegel
14 Jan	Dresden	2,000	Dresdner Neueste Nachrichten
14 Jan	Kiel	7,000	Norddeutscher Rundfunk
14 Jan	Potsdam	ca. 10,000	Der Spiegel
14 Jan	Saarbrücken	5,000	Saarländischer Rundfunk
14 Jan	Stendal	100	Volksstimme
15 Jan	Essen	6,700	Der Spiegel
15 Jan	Leipzig	6,000–7,000	Der Spiegel
15 Jan	Rostock	2,500	Der Spiegel
15 Jan	Tübingen	1,500	Südwestrundfunk
16 Jan	Cologne	up to 30,000	Kölner Stadt-Anzeiger
16 Jan	Hannover	8,500	Norddeutscher Rundfunk
16 Jan	Peine	500	Norddeutscher Rundfunk
16 Jan	Schwerin	1,600	Die Zeit
16 Jan	Würzburg	2,000	Bayerischer Rundfunk
17 Jan	Bergen auf Rügen	300	Ostsee-Zeitung
17 Jan	Berlin	3,500	Tagesschau
17 Jan	Freiburg im Breisgau	6,000–10,000	Tagesschau
17 Jan	Salzwedel	120	Volksstimme
18 Jan	Castrop-Rauxel	1,500	Ruhr Nachrichten
18 Jan	Gera	250	Mitteldeutscher Rundfunk
18 Jan	Mainz	5,000	Südwestrundfunk
19 Jan	Bielefeld	4,000	Radio Bielefeld
19 Jan	Bochum	13,000	Westdeutscher Rundfunk Köln
19 Jan	Dahlenburg	500	Campact
19 Jan	Detmold	400	Westdeutscher Rundfunk Köln
19 Jan	Erlangen	4,000	Bayerischer Rundfunk
19 Jan	Gummersbach	400	Westdeutscher Rundfunk Köln
19 Jan	Hamburg	180,000	Norddeutscher Rundfunk
19 Jan	Iserlohn	400	Iserlohner Kreisanzeiger und Zeitung
19 Jan	Jena	3,300	Mitteldeutscher Rundfunk
19 Jan	Jülich	700	Westdeutscher Rundfunk Köln
19 Jan	Kiel	4,000	Norddeutscher Rundfunk
19 Jan	Lüdenscheid	500	Westdeutscher Rundfunk Köln
19 Jan	Minden	4,000	Westdeutscher Rundfunk Köln
19 Jan	Münster	20,000	Westfälischer Anzeiger
19 Jan	Nettetal	1,000	Westdeutscher Rundfunk Köln
19 Jan	Rosenheim	over 500	Oberbayerisches Volksblatt
19 Jan	Stralsund	1,200–2,000	Die Zeit
19 Jan	Wuppertal	4,000	Wuppertaler Rundschau
20 Jan	Aachen	10,000	Tagesschau
20 Jan	Bamberg	6,000	Bayerischer Rundfunk
20 Jan	Braunschweig	15,000	Braunschweiger Zeitung
20 Jan	Dortmund	30,000	Der Spiegel, Tagesschau
20 Jan	Erfurt	9,000	Tagesschau
20 Jan	Frankfurt am Main	40,000	Hessenschau, Der Spiegel, Tagesschau
20 Jan	Freiburg im Breisgau	5,000	Tagesschau
20 Jan	Gießen	12,000	Tagesschau
20 Jan	Halle (Saale)	16,000	Die Zeit, Tagesschau
20 Jan	Hannover	35,000	Der Spiegel, Tagesschau
20 Jan	Heidelberg	18,000	Rhein-Neckar-Zeitung
20 Jan	Karlsruhe	20,000	Die Zeit, Tagesschau
20 Jan	Kassel	12,000–15,000	Tagesschau, Hessische/Niedersächsische Allgemeine
20 Jan	Koblenz	5,000	Der Spiegel, Tagesschau
20 Jan	Lingen	10,000	Neue Osnabrücker Zeitung
20 Jan	Lüneburg	5,000	Der Spiegel
20 Jan	Nürnberg	15,000	Tagesschau
20 Jan	Offenburg	5,000	Campact
20 Jan	Oldenburg	5,000	Campact
20 Jan	Recklinghausen	12,000	Tagesschau
20 Jan	Stuttgart	20,000	Der Spiegel
20 Jan	Ulm	8,000–10,000	Tagesschau
20 Jan	Wuppertal	10,000	Westdeutsche Zeitung
21 Jan	Berlin	over 100,000	Die Zeit
21 Jan	Bonn	30,000	Tagesschau
21 Jan	Bremen	40,000–45,000	Die Zeit
21 Jan	Chemnitz	12,000	Tagesschau
21 Jan	Cologne	70,000	Tagesschau
21 Jan	Cottbus	3,500–5,000	Tagesschau
21 Jan	Dresden	25,000–40,000	Mitteldeutscher Rundfunk
21 Jan	Flensburg	10,000	Norddeutscher Rundfunk
21 Jan	Freiburg im Breisgau	25,000	Badische Zeitung
21 Jan	Göttingen	12,000	RND
21 Jan	Herrenberg	6,000	Kreiszeitung Böblinger Bote
21 Jan	Kleve	5,000	Tagesschau
21 Jan	Leipzig	60,000–70,000	Mitteldeutscher Rundfunk, RND
21 Jan	Mülheim an der Ruhr	7,000	Tagesschau
21 Jan	Munich	100,000–250,000	Tagesschau
21 Jan	Regensburg	13,000	Bayerischer Rundfunk
21 Jan	Saarbrücken	13,000	Tagesschau
21 Jan	Stuttgart	8,000	Stuttgarter Zeitung
22 Jan	Hamm	5,500	wa.de
22 Jan	Paderborn	5,000	Westdeutscher Rundfunk Köln
23 Jan	Heilbronn	8,000–15,000	Tagesschau
24 Jan	Konstanz	14,000–20,000	Südkurier
24 Jan	Landshut	7,000	Passauer Neue Presse
24 Jan	Oberhausen	5,000	Rheinische Post
25 Jan	Hagen	5,000	Westfalenpost
25 Jan	Mönchengladbach	5,000–7,000	Rheinische Post
25 Jan	Rostock	6,500	Norddeutscher Rundfunk
25 Jan	Siegen	5,000	Rheinische Post
25 Jan	Wiesbaden	15,000	Hessenschau
26 Jan	Dorsten	5,000	
26 Jan	Fürth	6,000	Bayerischer Rundfunk
26 Jan	Nordhorn	6,000	Ems Vechte Welle
26 Jan	Reutlingen	5,000	Südwestrundfunk
26 Jan	Saarbrücken	7,500	Südwestrundfunk
27 Jan	Aachen	20,000	Tagesschau
27 Jan	Bocholt	9,000	BBV, Borkener Zeitung
27 Jan	Borken	4,500–5,000	BBV, Borkener Zeitung
27 Jan	Dinslaken	5,000	BBV, Borkener Zeitung
27 Jan	Düren	5,000	
27 Jan	Elmshorn	up to 6,000	Schleswig-Holsteinischer Zeitungsverlag
27 Jan	Gelsenkirchen	6,500	
27 Jan	Eschweiler	5,000	Aachener Zeitung
27 Jan	Hildesheim	7,500	
27 Jan	Hof (Saale)	6,000	
27 Jan	Husum	5,000	Schleswig-Holsteinischer Zeitungsverlag
27 Jan	Ingolstadt	6,000	Die Zeit
27 Jan	Kaiserslautern	6,000	Der Spiegel
27 Jan	Kiel	11,500	Schleswig-Holsteinischer Zeitungsverlag
27 Jan	Lübeck	8,000	Schleswig-Holsteinischer Zeitungsverlag
27 Jan	Mannheim	20,000	Rhein-Neckar-Zeitung
27 Jan	Marburg	16,000	Hessenschau
27 Jan	Marl	6,000	
27 Jan	Moers	8,000	
27 Jan	Passau	6,000	Passauer Neue Presse
27 Jan	Ravensburg	9,000	
27 Jan	Regensburg	2,000–5,000	Mittelbayerische Zeitung
27 Jan	Schwabach	5,000	Tagesschau
27 Jan	Schweinfurt	6,500	Die Zeit
27 Jan	Schwerte	5,000	Ruhr Nachrichten
27 Jan	Solingen	5,000	Solinger Tageblatt
27 Jan	Düsseldorf	100,000	Der Spiegel
28 Jan	Bremerhaven	7,000	buten un binnen
28 Jan	Dormagen	5,000	
28 Jan	Esslingen	8,000	
28 Jan	Hamburg	60,000–100,000	Die Zeit
28 Jan	Ibbenbüren	7,000	Westfälische Nachrichten
28 Jan	Ludwigsburg	7,000	
28 Jan	Osnabrück	25,000	Der Spiegel
28 Jan	Trier	10,000	Südwestrundfunk
30 Jan	Bielefeld	25,000	taz
30 Jan	Fulda	8,500–10,000	Fuldaer Zeitung
30 Jan	Rheine	7,000	Münsterländische Volkszeitung
3 Feb	Aalen	7,000	Schwäbische Zeitung
3 Feb	Ahaus	6,000	Westfälische Nachrichten
3 Feb	Augsburg	25,000	Bayerischer Rundfunk
3 Feb	Berlin	150,000–300,000	The Guardian
3 Feb	Dresden	30,000	Mitteldeutscher Rundfunk
3 Feb	Freiburg im Breisgau	over 30,000	Badische Zeitung
3 Feb	Nuremberg	25,000	Der Tagesspiegel
4 Feb	Amberg	5,000	Der neue Tag
4 Feb	Bremen	16,500	Weser-Kurier
4 Feb	Emsdetten	5,000	Emsdettener Volkszeitung
4 Feb	Lübeck	5,000–9,000	Norddeutscher Rundfunk
4 Feb	Wesel	5,000	Neue Ruhr Zeitung
5 Feb	Frankfurt am Main	19,000–25,000	Frankfurter Rundschau
10 Feb	Hameln	over 5,000	Deister- und Weserzeitung
10 Feb	Rostock	3,200–5,000	Tagesschau
11 Feb	Dresden	5,000	Mitteldeutscher Rundfunk
11 Feb	Munich	75,000–100,000	Der Spiegel
13 Feb	Dresden	13,000	Mitteldeutscher Rundfunk
16 Feb	Münster	30,000	Die Zeit
17 Feb	Hanau	5,000	Die Zeit
17 Feb	Magdeburg	3,000–6,000	Mitteldeutscher Rundfunk
17 Feb	Recklinghausen	5,000	Recklinghäuser Zeitung
18 Feb	Donauwörth	5,000	Augsburger Allgemeine
18 Feb	Essen	15,000	RND
18 Feb	Saarbrücken	7,000	Saarländischer Rundfunk
18 Feb	Wolfsburg	7,000	Braunschweiger Zeitung
24 Feb	Stuttgart	8,000	Die Zeit
24 Feb	Willich	2,500–5,000	Rheinische Post
25 Feb	Dresden	20,000	Mitteldeutscher Rundfunk
25 Feb	Hamburg	60,000	Deutsche Welle
25 Feb	Lübeck	5,000	Lübecker Nachrichten
25 Feb	Oldenburg	7,000	Nordwest-Zeitung
25 Feb	Paderborn	5,000	Westfalen-Blatt, Mindener Tageblatt
2 Mar	Duisburg	15,000	Süddeutsche Zeitung
3 Mar	Augsburg	6,500	Bayerischer Rundfunk
3 Mar	Bochum/Herne	5,000	Westdeutsche Allgemeine Zeitung
3 Mar	Würzburg	10,000	Süddeutsche Zeitung
17 Mar	Bremen	5,000	Weser-Kurier

=== Analysis of 2024 protests ===
By the last week of January 2024, the protests had become the biggest in Germany since the protests against the Iraq War in 2003. Soon after, according to some researchers, they had become the biggest in the history of the Federal Republic of Germany.

In early February 2024, sociologist Dieter Rucht said that the speed with which the protests had erupted had generally not been foreseen.

In late January 2024, Tareq Sydiq, a researcher at the Center for Conflict Studies at the University of Marburg said that the protests refuted a common narrative of far-right groups, insofar as they did not originate solely from groups in the left spectrum in major cities. He further stated that the effects of even small protests in rural areas should not be underestimated, pointing to the stronger influence that personal acquaintances had as compared to following protests through media.

The protests in early 2024 saw a much lower participation from the CDU/CSU Christian democrats than from parties further to the left in the political spectrum.

Some observers assessed that it was unclear whether the first wave of protests had triggered changes beyond a somewhat greater awareness of politics and society of connections between the AfD and right-wing extremists. At the end of 2024, the AfD polled only slightly lower than before the protests.

== Protests in 2025 ==
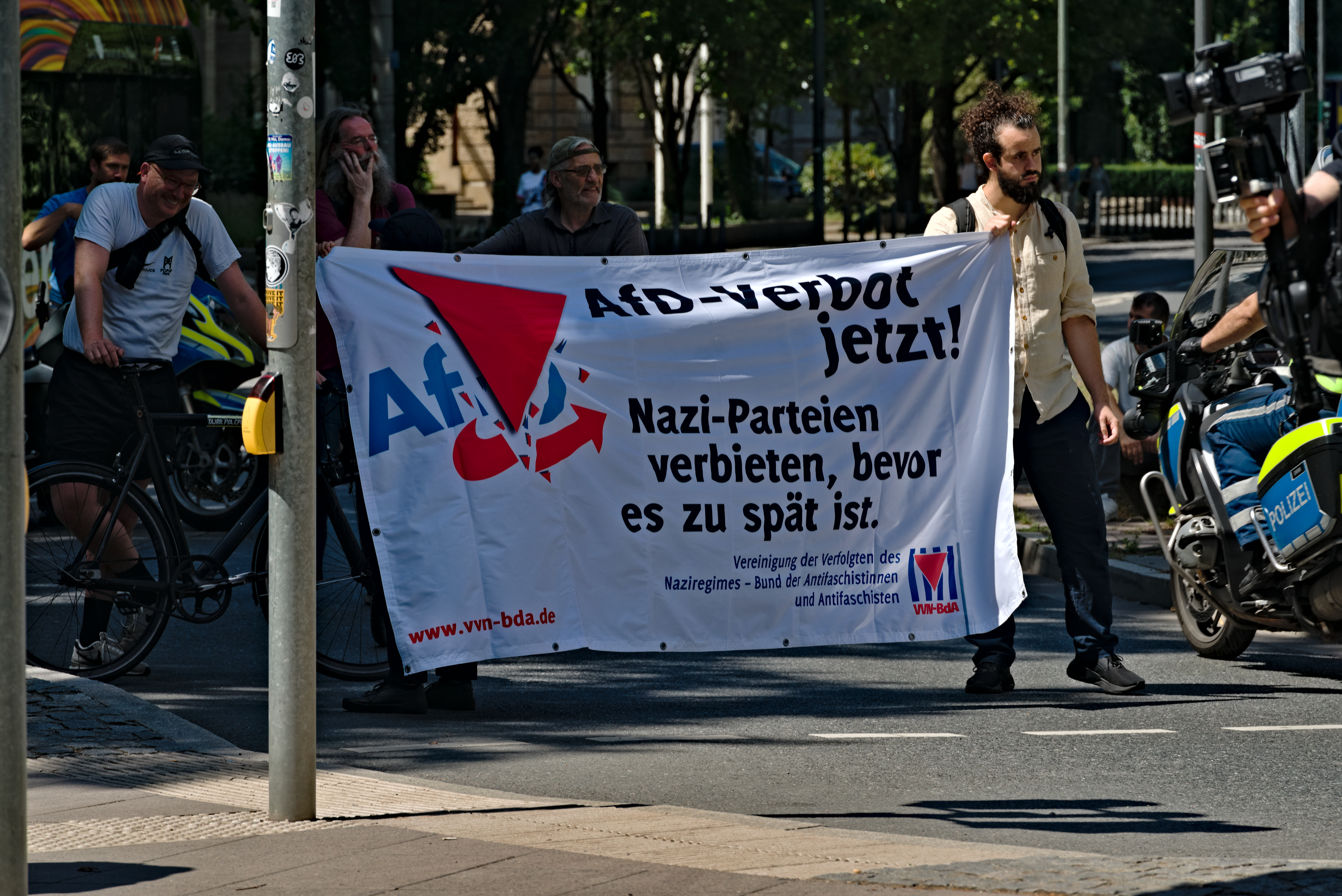
Association of Persecutees of the Nazi Regime – Federation of Antifascists (VVN-BdA) protest banner at a protest against Alternative for Germany in Frankfurt in 2025. Translation: "Ban the AfD now! Ban Nazi parties, before it's too late".

A wave of anti-AfD protests in January and February 2025 was compared by observers to the protests of 2024. The new wave of protests, which came shortly before the federal election held on 23 February, was partly in response to a non-binding resolution to restrict immigration which the CDU/CSU had pushed through parliament with the help of the AfD on 29 January 2025. The name Brandmauer-Demos, incorporating a previously used term for blocking the AfD from any influence on parliamentary decisions, was used by some media for the rallies of this wave. On the day before the election, Merz made defiant statements regarding the protests.

Demonstrations with at least 25,000 participants
Date	Location	Participants
1 Feb 2025	Hamburg	65,000–80,000
1 Feb 2025	Stuttgart	44,000
2 Feb 2025	Berlin	at least 160,000
8 Feb 2025	Munich	250,000–320,000
16 Feb 2025	Berlin	30,000–38,000

The Bundestag resolution of 29 January was seen by observers as having created a tense mood that expressed itself not only through peaceful demonstrations, but also in widespread vandalism of CDU election placards, as well as occasional attacks on helpers. In Hamburg, police gave advice to CDU on how to maintain safety at election campaign stands, stopping short of advising them to be cancelled. The party decided to cancel some campaign stands anyway. Sociologist Simon Teune identified what he called a "cascade of protests and counterprotests" that saw each side picking what made it look favourable; he called the criticism by CDU/CSU members of the violence a means of distraction from the fact that "almost a million" had demonstrated against the circumstances of the Bundestag resolution. A large majority of people did not condone threats or physical violence. He further said that spray-painting of local CDU branches and occupations of local offices would affect other parties too and were within the common scope of protests.

Felix Anderl, a researcher at the Center for Conflict Studies at the University of Marburg, stated in an interview in early February that in addition to the wish of people for certain things not to change so close to elections, the strategy of CDU leader Friedrich Merz was adding urgency for the protesters.

After the federal election, the CDU filed a catalogue of 551 parliamentary questions regarding 17 civil society groups, to inquire about the amount of funding that these groups had received from the government, and whether there were indications of misuse of funds. Groups mentioned included Campact, Correctiv, Greenpeace, and Omas gegen Rechts. The filing was described in media as having been motivated by the rallies in response to the 29 January resolution. The CDU said that it had begun drafting it before the election. The filing met with sharp criticism from the addressed NGOs, and also prompted criticism from the social democrats, who were at the time preparing to enter talks with the CDU/CSU about a new grand coalition.

In the wake of the decision by the Federal Office for the Protection of the Constitution (BfV) in early May 2025 that the AfD was a "confirmed right-wing extremist" party, which was challenged in court by the party and resulted in a "standstill commitment" on the side of the BfV until a ruling, a protest in Berlin on 11 May 2025 calling for a ban of the party attracted 4,000 protesters according to police, and 7,500 according to the organizers. Rallies were also scheduled in over 60 other German cites.

== See also ==
- Far-right politics in Germany (1945–present)
- Alternative for Germany
- 2023 Potsdam far-right meeting
- Remigration, plan by members of the far right and Identitarian movements for the forced return of non-ethnically European immigrants to their respective countries of ethnic origin
- Madagascar Plan, plan for the mass deportation of the Jewish population proposed by the Nazi Party in the 1930s, compared with the Potsdam Plan
- 2024 French protests against the National Rally, similar protests against right-wing extremism in France
- 2022 German coup d'état plot, far-right monarchist plot which involved AfD party members
