= COVID-19 protests in Germany =

Protests against the COVID-19 lockdowns in Germany

COVID-19 anti-lockdown protests in Germany
- Part of protests over responses to the COVID-19 pandemic
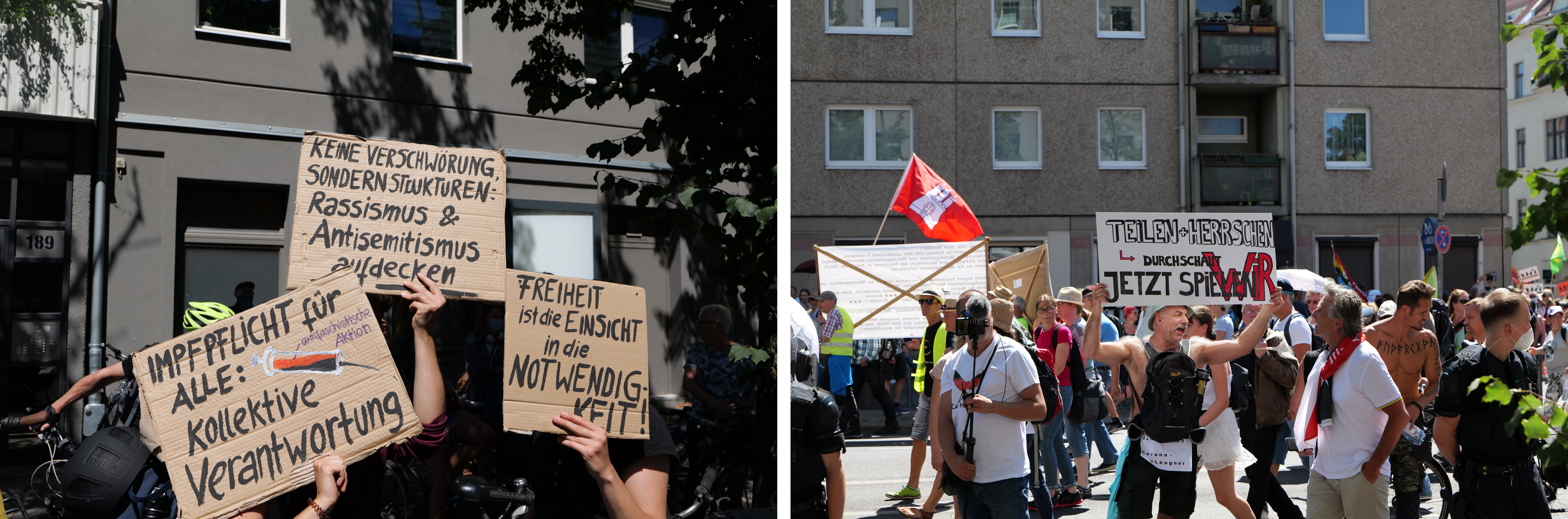
- Collage showing protest by coronavirus-conspiracy theory believers and right-wing extremists (right) and counter-protesters (left) in Berlin, 1 August 2020
- Date: 4 April 2020 – 1 October 2022
- Location: Berlin and several other cities
- Caused by: Opposition to the government measures against the COVID-19 pandemic in Germany
- Goals: Ending COVID-19 restrictions in Germany
- Methods: Protests; Defying social distancing; Motorcades (from January 2021)
- Status: Concluded

Arrests
- Arrested: 1850+

Since April 2020, when Germany's Federal Constitutional Court ruled that the governmental lockdown imposed in March to counter the COVID-19 pandemic did not allow blanket bans on rallies, numerous protests have been held in Germany against anti-pandemic regulations. The protests attracted a mix of people from varied backgrounds, including supporters of populist ideas who felt called to defend against what they saw as an arrogant central government; supporters of various conspiracy theories; and sometimes far right-wing groups. Anti-vaxxers generally also formed a major part of the protesters. Some protesters held strongly negative views towards public media, who they believed to report in an unfair manner; repeatedly, journalists covering the rallies were subjected to harassment and physical attacks. Such attacks were the main reason why Germany slipped from eleventh to 13th place in the Press Freedom Index of Reporters Without Borders, according to a report published on 20 April 2021.

Since about mid-2020, the main organizer of the protests has been a group called Querdenken (lit. 'lateral thinking'), which was initially based in Stuttgart but soon started to organize rallies also in Berlin and other cities. During the second lockdown starting in November 2020, radical conspiracy theorists increased their influence in the movement. The Federal Office for the Protection of the Constitution began to observe parts of the Querdenken movement countrywide in April 2021 for their questioning of the legitimacy of the state. The display of antisemitic tropes was common at rallies, which drew strong condemnation.

Local authorities repeatedly sought to ban rallies. Court challenges to the bans began to be upheld more often in late 2020 as the pandemic situation worsened, and as courts expressed their lack of faith in the ability of organisers to maintain physical distancing and other safety measures. Protests were frequently accompanied by counterprotests, which often resulted in tense situations as police tried to keep the groups apart.

== Background ==
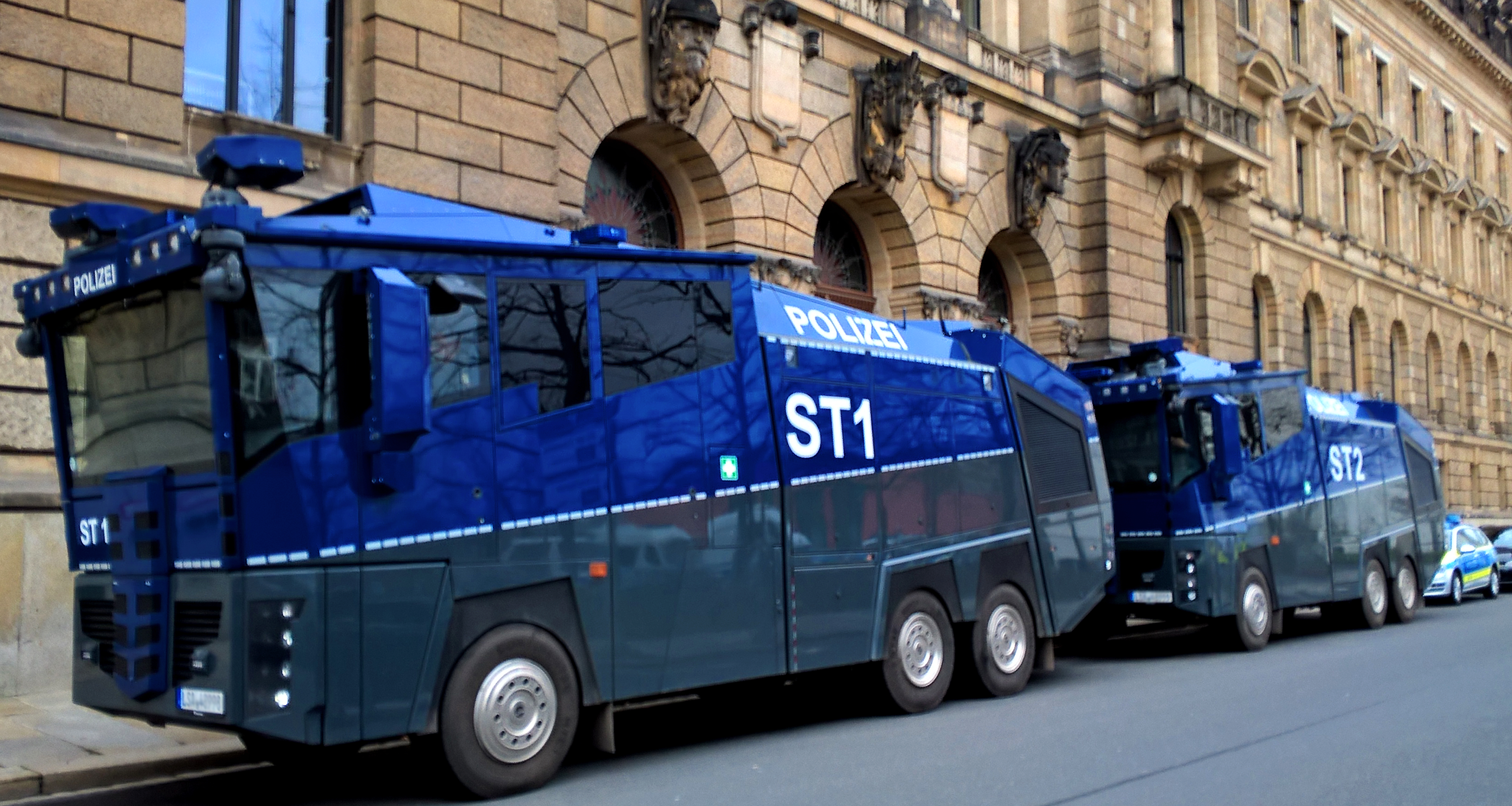
Two Saxony-Anhalt Bereitschaftspolizei Wasserwerfer 10000 water cannons in front of Dresden's central police station, 17 April 2021

From 22 March 2020, Germany entered a first lockdown in order to bring the COVID-19 pandemic under control. It was eventually extended, with some differences among federal states, until June 2020. The lockdown regulations included, besides a physical distancing requirement of 1.5 metres in public – to which a requirement to wear a nose and mouth covering in stores and on public transport was added in late April –, initially also a prohibition for restaurateurs to provide in-house dining; also, service providers in close-contact professions, such as hair-dressers, cosmetic, massage and tattoo studios, were required to close.

=== Early protests ===
The first protest of what became known as Hygienedemos (hygiene demonstrations) took place on 28 March in Berlin, and soon spread to other cities in Germany. At the 28 March rally no speeches were given, with its motto, "Defend basic rights – say no to dictatorship" also reflecting demands repeated at later weekly Hygienedemos. Observers noted that participants were from very disparate groups, some even holding conflicting views; they further noted that while the protesters were united in rejecting the anti-pandemic measures by the government – in which they saw violations of basic rights enshrined in the German constitution, such as the freedom of trade in view of the prohibitions mentioned above –, they lacked a common notion how they wanted society to be reshaped. During May, attendance at the Hygienedemos generally decreased sharply. This was attributed by observers to a combination of several factors: the relaxation of the lockdown that had been imposed in March; a high level of satisfaction in the general population about the government's handling of the crisis; the impact of counter-protests; and the recognition by the general population that the protests had shown to be utilized by the right-wing Alternative for Germany (AfD) and violent or extreme right-wing individuals sprouting conspiracy theories, including vegan chef Attila Hildmann. The German non-government organization platform Campact warned its members against attending the Hygienedemos.

=== Emergence of Querdenken (Lateral Thinking) movement ===
From mid 2020, the main organizer of protests has been a group called Querdenken ("lateral thinking"), which was initially based in Stuttgart but soon became a nationwide movement; individual Querdenken groups often appended the phone area code of their cities (such as Querdenken 711 for Stuttgart). Media soon began to use the term Querdenker to describe more generally any person opposing anti-pandemic measures, even though other groups were also organizing protests.

The Querdenken rallies saw a varied mixture of participants. While protests became smaller after those of summer 2020, violence became more frequent. There were increasing concerns that the rallies were becoming a platform for far-right, and even extremist, views, and that protesters were embracing conspiracy theories, notably those of the QAnon movement originating in the United States. Querdenken founder Michael Ballweg was reported to have said the motto of QAnon into the microphone at a rally in August 2020. However, according to a study published by the Federal Agency for Civic Education in January 2021, only a small number of protesters was integrating governmental pandemic policies into the theories of QAnon or the extreme-right Reichsbürger movement, which likewise was present at several rallies.

In a number of instances, local authorities banned rallies as they deemed coronavirus protection plans submitted by the organizers as insufficient. Several rallies only went ahead after a partial or whole overturn of such bans via court appeals. Prohibitions began to be upheld more often from late 2020, such as for a rally that had been planned in the northern city of Bremen for 5 December, as on two rallies planned for 12 December in Frankfurt and Dresden.

After a hiatus over the New Year, Querdenken founder Michael Ballweg announced on 27 January 2021 a resumption of protests through motorcades. The first such protest, drawing several hundred participants and extending over several kilometers, took place in Stuttgart the same day. Over the next fortnight, several motorcades took place in Munich. Smaller motorcades in Mannheim on 6 February were dissolved by police.

=== Ebbing of protests in 2021 ===
In June 2021, as Germany had overcome the third wave of the COVID-19 pandemic – with daily case numbers having decreased substantially from the peak while vaccination rates were increasing – , observers considered that, while Querdenken had not run its course, it was finding it more difficult to mobilize protesters. Josef Holnburger, politologist at the think tank Center für Monitoring, Analyse und Strategie, said that while the protests of 2020 had resulted in an increase in the number of subscribers to Telegram channels of the movement, that number had essentially leveled out since November 2020, which he ascribed to a string of unsuccessful protests. However, he expressed concern that the content discussed in those channels was at times becoming more radical. He said that the movement had already become active in other areas where it aimed to undermine trust in government institutions and their representatives, including Climate change denial and allegations of rigging in the 2021 German federal election scheduled for September. While he deemed it likely that these two topics would be there to stay for considerable time, they were unlikely to be as effective in mobilization of protesters as the COVID-19 pandemic.

=== Renewed rise during fourth and fifth waves of the pandemic ===
In late 2021, vaccine mandates became a subject of wide debate in Germany, as the vaccination rate had remained below government targets and daily case numbers in the fourth wave of the pandemic increased rapidly. The debate gave new momentum to the protests, which now focused on radical opposition against a mandate.

The new wave of protests originated in the state of Saxony, which in some areas had infection rates which were among the highest in Germany, widely traced to a relatively low vaccination rate. Emergency regulations that took effect in the state on 22 November 2021 limited public rallies to a maximum of ten people and prohibited marches. In response, particularly in small and medium-sized cities, protesters gathered for what they labelled as "strolls". The atmosphere at the strolls and other protests, for which calls were spread via Telegram by the right-wing extremist group "Free Saxons", was often tense. Police in Chemnitz confirmed in early December that strolls do not count as demonstrations, provided that physical distancing is observed. The ten-person limit was criticized by AfD parliamentary leader Jörg Urban as having disturbed the peace in the state, through pitting participants and police "automatically" against each other; he called for a "restitution of the freedom of assembly". The protest form of strolls was copied by protesters in other German states. In order to counter the circumvention of assembly regulations through the strolls, interior minister of Bavaria Joachim Herrmann suggested in early January 2022 that local authorities issue generally applicable restrictions on locale, time, or number of participants, making violations at strolls potentially subject to heavy fines on participants.

On 3 December 2021, around 30 people gathered in front of the private home of state health minister Petra Köpping in Grimma, some carrying flame torches. Police, the public prosecutor's office and state security were investigating the incident, which the Saxon state government labeled as "trespassing with the aim of intimidating responsible people." The gathering, for which the "Free Saxons" claimed responsibility, drew sharp criticism by several politicians from across the country, with Winfried Kretschmann saying, "These are methods invented by the SA." Newly appointed interior minister Nancy Faeser called the incident an "attempt at intimidation" and vowed to take strong action against any future torch rallies of Querdenken protesters or COVID-19 deniers.

In January 2022, figures from Querdenken shared a story by the German edition of The Epoch Times that amplified accusations by German activist Steffen Löhnitz that the Austrian government had deliberately inflated infection numbers to justify a lockdown, and reported his claims of "massive fraud" against the populations of Austria and Germany as fact.

=== Death threats and foiled plots against politicians ===
For his anti-pandemic policies, premier of Saxony Michael Kretschmer was the target of right-wing death threats spread on Telegram. An investigation by state police and prosecutors against a concrete threat of a plot against Kretschmer and other state politicians was reported in December 2021. On 15 December, around 140 police officers searched the homes of six suspects, five males and one female, in Dresden and a property in Heidenau, seizing weaponry including crossbows, as well as mobile phones, computers and electronic storage devices.

In April 2022, police foiled a plot by a right-wing extremist group that, in order to achieve its aim of creating a "war-like" situation to topple the German government, had intended to kidnap health minister Karl Lauterbach, besides planting bombs in energy infrastructure.

== Police response ==
Repeatedly, police officers were attacked by protesters. Police was criticized on several occasions for its de-escalation strategy which allowed pandemic regulations to be violated, and for its actions against counterprotesters. Some observers noted that police faced difficulties in devising containment strategies due to the unusual mixture of protesters, which on several occasions included families with children and retirees.

From late 2021, a pattern emerged whereby protests, inspired in part by the antecedents in Saxony, were labelled by protesters as "strolls". Subsequent police action against these protests was regularly labelled by protesters as excessive police violence. Observers saw this as a deliberate tactic of the movement.

Oliver Malchow, chief of police union GdP, said in late December 2021 that the numerous protests were "putting a huge strain" on the police force, which was "running at full capacity all the time right now". He expressed concern over the psychological consequences on the force.

== Protests ==
The list of protests below is not exhaustive. By the end of 2021, countless protests had been held across the country.

=== April/May 2020 ===
==== Berlin ====
At the protest of 25 April, 1,000 protesters were gathered at the Volksbühne theatre. A slogan shouted by the people was: "I want my life back". Protest signs read: "Protect constitutional rights", "Freedom isn't everything, but without freedom, everything is nothing", "Daddy, what is a kiss?". Physical distance requirements were violated by a part of the protesters. The police arrested 100 people, a spokesman said that "during coronavirus times and according to containment regulations, we are obliged to prevent a gathering". Protesters handed out a newspaper questioning the need for lockdown measures and claiming the coronavirus is an attempt to seize power by spreading fear, this newspaper quoted 127 medical doctors questioning the need for strict lockdowns.

Two rallies against COVID-19 policies took place in Berlin on 9 May. At a rally in front of the Reichstag building, where conspiracy theorists had been speaking according to observations by a press photographer, police arrested about 30 protesters. The purpose of the arrests had mainly been to check identities after the minimum distance requirement had not been met multiple times, and as calls by police on protesters to observe the 50-person limit for the location were not heeded. At a rally on Alexanderplatz, 86 protesters were detained.

==== Stuttgart ====
Also on 25 April, in Stuttgart a protest was organized by the group Querdenken 711, which drew between 350 and 500 people. Initially, this gathering was banned, and it could only go through after the Federal Constitutional Court gave its permission. This group Querdenken 711 considers the German corona restrictions to be disproportionate, and since May they demand in their manifesto that all measures that they deemed to be violations of the German Constitution by the German corona measures be repealed.

During May, weekly Querdenken protests in Stuttgart had participants numbering in the thousands but saw a steep drop towards the end of the month. Rallies in Berlin and other cities also considerably decreased in size.

==== Other cities ====
A rally in Munich on 9 May drew more than 3,000 demonstrators, who demanded the lifting of the coronavirus related restrictions. While many participants did not heed the instructions by police to maintain the physical distancing requirement, police refrained from dispersing the protesters "on the grounds of proportionality", as there was no violence. Thousands of others joined protests in Stuttgart and other German cities.

=== 1 August 2020, Berlin ===
On Saturday, 1 August, Querdenken 711 organized a demonstration in the capital Berlin. The master of ceremonies told the crowd to maintain some physical distance so as not to give the authorities a "pretext" to break up the event, but police reported that most demonstrators did not adhere to social distancing rules.

The police at first stated there had been 20,000 protesters. That number caused commotion, the organizers estimated there might have been 800,000 or more people. This number was dismissed by media fact-checkers as improbable. The police later reconsidered their counting, and on Friday, 28 August, raised it to 30,000 demonstrators.

=== 29 August 2020, Berlin ===
On Saturday 29 August, two demonstrations were organized by Querdenken 711 in Berlin. Leading politicians of the far-right Alternative for Germany (AfD), including Tino Chrupalla and Björn Höcke, called for participation at the demonstrations, as did far-right political activist Götz Kubitschek. According to information obtained by RND, party co-leader Jörg Meuthen had issued an internal warning to his party against advertising the rally, due to the expected presence of adherents of far-right views and conspiracy theorists; several AfD members of the Bundestag (federal parliament) who had previously supported Meuthen in party-internal conflicts still joined the rally.

In total 38,000 people gathered according to official police statements, from Germany and other European countries. A previous ban by the authorities on the protests had been nullified by the courts, on condition of ensuring through announcements and orderlies that the minimum physical distance requirement would be met; no nose and mouth cover requirement was made.

In the morning, 18,000 people had gathered in the city centre, planning to march from Unter den Linden to the Brandenburger Tor and Großer Stern. But as most demonstrators refused to keep the dictated 1½ meters distance or wear a nose and mouth covering that the police had mandated after the physical distance breaches, the police dispersed this demonstration after a few hours.

In the afternoon, 30,000 people gathered at Straße des 17. Juni and Großer Stern for a demonstration with several orators. Among those addressing the crowd were the American lawyer and activist Robert F. Kennedy Jr., nephew of assassinated US President John F. Kennedy and son of the assassinated US presidential hopeful Robert F. Kennedy. Referring to the famed Ich bin ein Berliner speech that his uncle had given in the city in 1963, he told the crowd that "today Berlin is again the front against totalitarianism", warning of a surveillance state.

Mainstream media reporting on this protest, in Germany as well as other European countries and the United States, laid more emphasis on what was called a "storming" of the Reichstag building (Parliament building) by a group of people associated with "far-right" or even "nazis" than on the concerns of most demonstrators over worldwide corona policies. In total, police made 316 arrests, among them vegan chef and conspiracy theorist Attila Hildmann. A substantial number of members of the extreme-right Reichsbürger movement was present at the rallies.

=== 12 September 2020, Munich ===
Permissions for a demonstration by Querdenken 089 – the Munich section of the Querdenken movement – were not finalized until the early morning, when a higher court overturned an earlier prohibition on the condition that anti-pandemic regulations were properly observed. However, the parade through the city was called off after organizers were unable to enforce the requirement on protesters to wear a nose and mouth covering, and the requirement on minimum physical distance. Also, at about 3,000, the number of protesters was much higher than the 500 which had been approved by authorities. The subsequent main rally on the Theresienwiese was attended by about 10,000 protesters according to police estimates, few of whom were wearing a mask. A counterdemonstration on Goetheplatz was organized by an alliance of almost 50 organizations under the motto "solidarity instead of right-wing conspiracy mania".

=== 20 September 2020, Düsseldorf ===
A protest against COVID-19 related government restrictions took place on 20 September in North Rhine-Westphalia (NRW) state capital Düsseldorf. Participants were required to maintain the physical distancing requirement of 1.5 metres as per NRW pandemic bylaws, but were not required to wear masks. Several counterdemonstrations were held in the city on the same day.

=== 3–4 October 2020, Konstanz ===
Protests organized by Querdenken took place in Konstanz over two days. For the protests on 3 October, police estimated an attendance of 11,000 to 12,000 participants. Protesters who did not heed the nose and mouth cover requirement during an outdoor church service clashed with police who had been deployed to ensure that this requirement was met. For 4 October, organizers had called for a human chain of protesters around Lake Constance, but abandoned this plan as there were only 2,000 participants according to police. On the same day, counterprotests close to the Swiss border drew about 1,000 participants. Police used tear gas once to keep the two sides apart.

=== 7 November 2020, Leipzig ===
A rally in Leipzig organized by Querdenken attracted at least 20,000 participants. Initially, police had intended the protest route to avoid the Augustusplatz in the inner city. This was overturned by the supreme administrative court of Saxony, whose decision had been based on a prospective estimate of approximately 16,000 participants, considering this to not exceed the capacity of the locality and neighbouring side streets under the physical distancing rules. Police tried to prevent the crowd – of which about 90 per cent did not heed the requirement to wear a nose and mouth covering, as police estimated – from proceeding to the inner city, but eventually allowed it through. Demonstrators sporadically clashed with police, and some attacked journalists. In response to the events, Saxony announced a tightening of pandemic related restrictions to come into force on 13 November, limiting the number of participants at rallies to a maximum of 1,000, subject to exceptions.

Government spokesperson Steffen Seibert later said that "extremists, troublemakers and people prepared to use violence" had been present at the demonstration.

=== 18 November 2020, Berlin ===
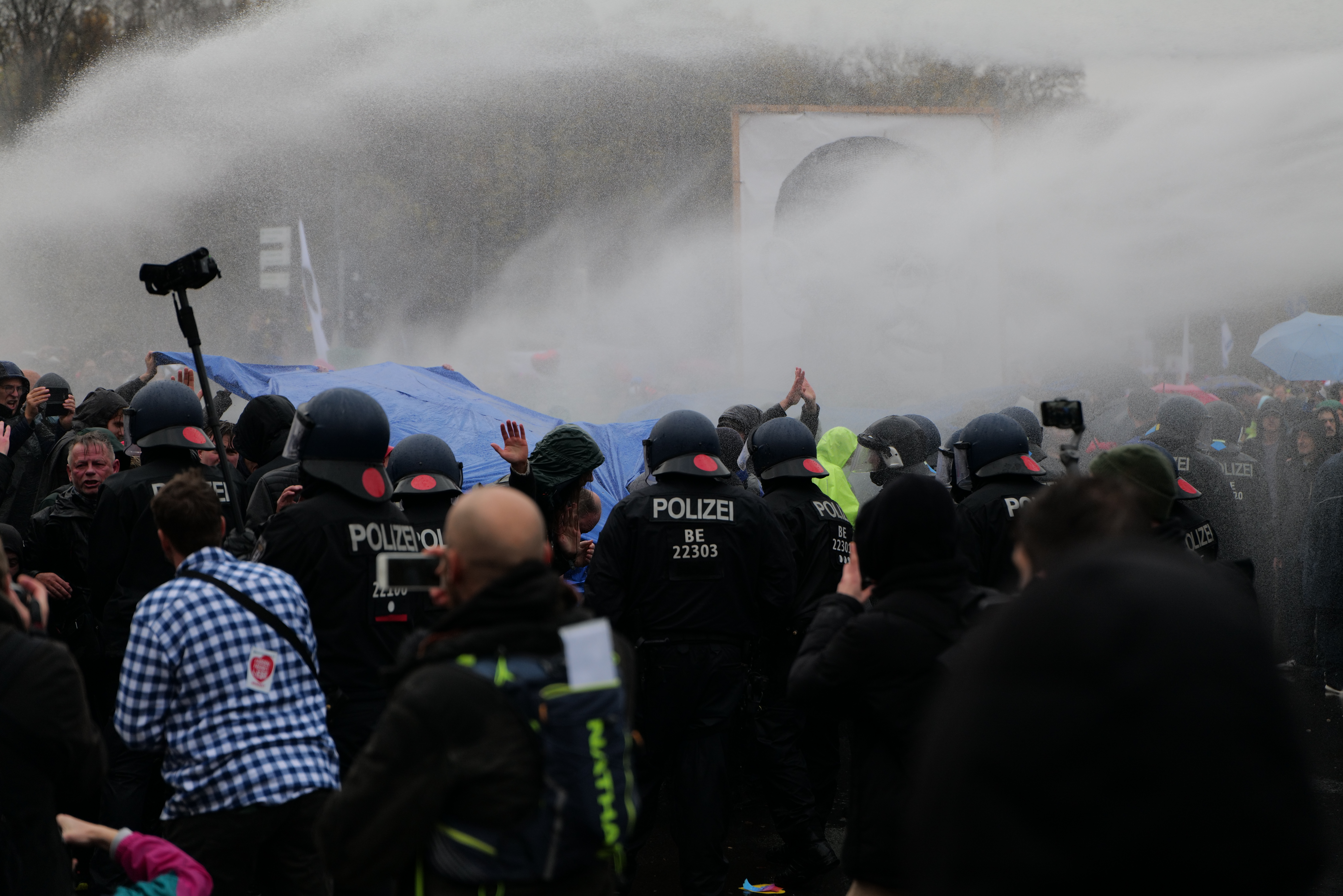
Police dispersing the protesters in Berlin on 18 November with water cannon, as the pandemic prevention requirements were not observed

A protest particularly against the inclusion of current coronavirus restrictions into the Infection Protection Law took place in Berlin. Tensions ran high as protesters attempted to reach the Reichstag parliament building, in which the Bundestag was in session to discuss the law. The protesters were stopped by police in riot gear, and used water cannon to disperse protesters. Almost 80 police were injured in clashes. Police made 365 arrests. The number of protesters at the rally was estimated to be over 10,000. Police used water cannon to disperse the protesters; this was the first time they had come to be used in the city since 2013. In an interview the following day, the Berlin police director stated that the water cannon had deliberately been directed above the protesters (as seen in the photo) as police had intended to make the protesters feel uncomfortable in the cold weather and induce them to leave, also given that their proximity to the water cannon and the presence of children in the crowd had ruled out tougher action.

On the same day, in highly unusual scenes, verbally aggressive individuals entered the Bundestag and were eventually removed by police. The Tagesspiegel reported that there had been four individuals entering, on invitation by AfD politicians Petr Bystron, Udo Hemmelgarn, and Hansjörg Müller. The actions by the four individuals were criticized severely by observers, who considered their verbal attacks during their actions as proof that they had not intended to have any meaningful discourse with the politicians they encountered and filmed. The parliamentary advisory committee commenced an investigation of the incident. A parliamentary speaker said on 14 January 2021 that two participants had been banned from the Reichstag, with the still pending cases expected to result in fines.

=== 21 November 2020, Leipzig ===
Several protests and counter-protests took place in Leipzig. The group Mitteldeutschland bewegt sich registered a rally on the Kurt-Masur-Platz. As the number of protesters reached 500 – twice as many as had been registered with authorities –, police considered the capacity of the location to be reached and stopped further protesters from entering. The protest was later cancelled because the applicant was unable to produce a valid medical certificate to justify his refusal to wear a nose and mouth covering. Several hundred protesters then moved through the inner city heading for the Rathaus (Town Hall), but were stopped and encircled by police, who strove to separate protesters and counter-protesters, which was regarded in the evening as largely successful. Police refused to issue permits for spontaneous demonstrations. According to reports, a spontaneous demonstration of about 200 protesters organized by Antifa moved through the city centre. Leipzig mayor Burkhard Jung praised the contrast to the chaotic scenes at the Querdenken rally from two weeks earlier.

=== 29 November 2020, Frankfurt an der Oder ===
Some 1,000 Querdenker protesters rallied in Frankfurt an der Oder, including about 150 from the city of Slubice across the border to Poland. Most of the protesters did not heed physical distancing requirements, nor did they wear nose and mouth coverings, in defiance of repeated urging by the several hundred police attending. Querdenken founder Michael Ballweg said in his speech that the movement had no place for extremism, violence, antisemitism, and inhuman ideas; several known extremists took part in the march, however. About 150 counter-protesters marched through the inner city of Frankfurt an der Oder.

=== 5 December 2020, Bremen ===
For 5 December, Querdenken 421 called for a "nationwide festival for peace and freedom" with a planned 20,000 participants in Bremen. After a ban by the municipality and two rejected applications for interim legal protection at the administrative court Bremen and higher administrative court of the Free Hanseatic City of Bremen (OVG Bremen), the group went to the Bundesverfassungsgericht (BVerfG, federal constitutional court) and continued to mobilize for the demonstration. The BVerfG accepted the municipality's justification that with the expected high number of participants, minimum distances could not be maintained. Despite the ban, demonstrators arrived. The Bremen authorities made clear in advance that they would not allow gatherings. Several smaller prohibited demonstrations were dispersed. In total, 800 complaints were filed, and 900 dismissals of protesters were enforced. Interior Senator Ulrich Mäurer (SPD) said that Bremen had "set a signal also for other cities [...] that one has to fight back". This "madness" (Mäurer) would have cost the taxpayer around 750,000 euros, he said.

=== 6 December 2020, Düsseldorf ===
Around 1,500 participants of the Querdenken movement went to a demonstration in the city center of Düsseldorf. Amongst them several right wing groups attended. Massive police presence, such as a mounted division, a helicopter and water guns, made it possible to keep violence and riots to a minimum. In November there already was a demonstration with about 500 people, due to the new program and different speakers, such as Michael Ballweg (founder of the movement), the number rose to 1,500 participants from all over Germany.

Counterdemonstrations were held at the same time, with people from Church, trade unions and the cultural scene. Their reason for demonstrating mainly was that the Querdenken movement, in their view, had not sufficiently distanced itself from right-wing groups.

=== 12 December 2020 - Frankfurt am Main, Dresden, Erfurt ===
In spite of legal bans on large demonstrations in Frankfurt am Main, Dresden and Erfurt on Saturday, 12 December 2020, unspecified numbers of protesters turned up anyway in Frankfurt and Dresden, clashing with police forces and with counterprotesters, while in Erfurt, 500 corona protesters also clashed with police.

=== 13 March 2021, several German cities ===
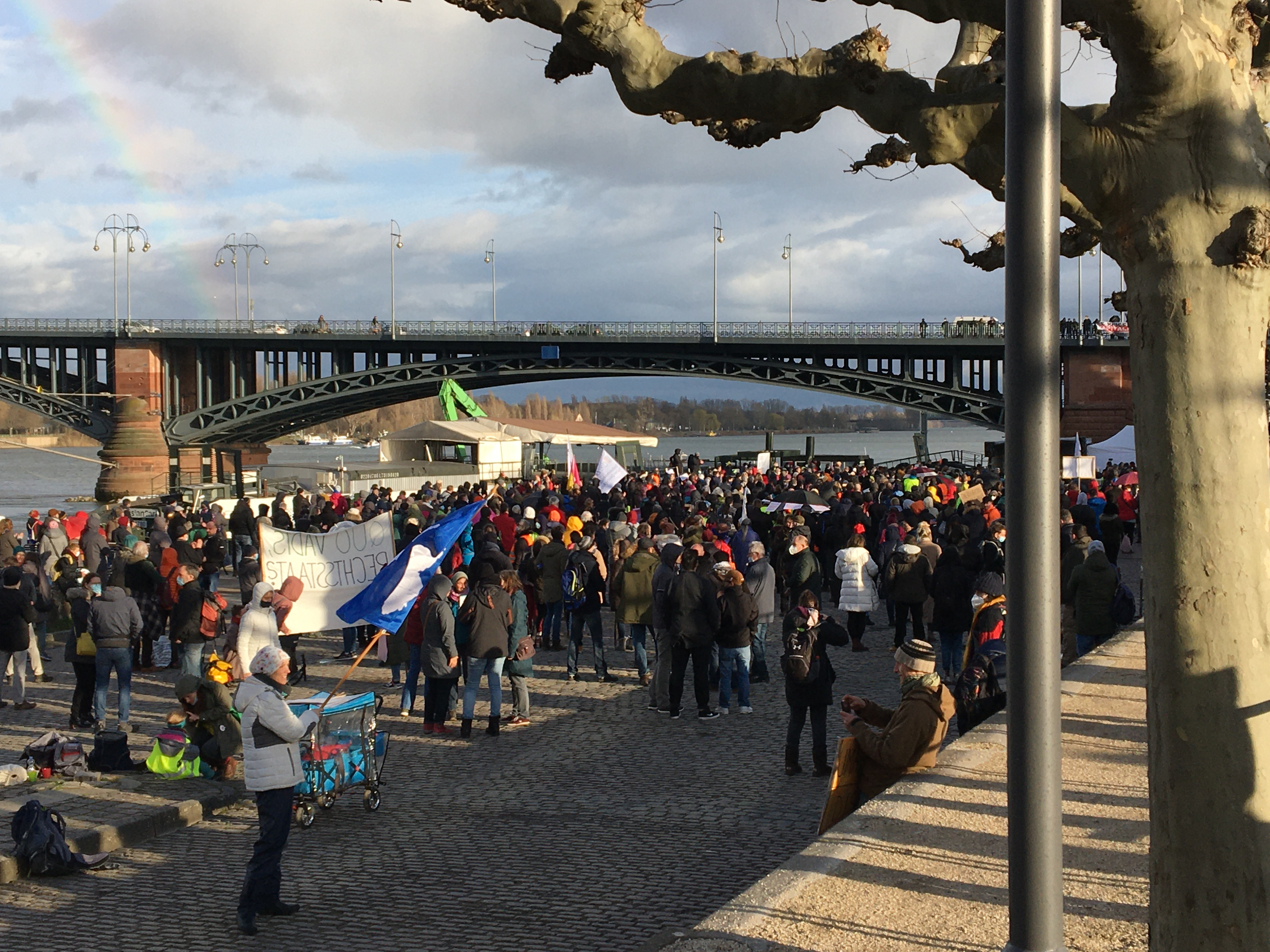
Protest in Mainz in front of the Theodor Heuss Bridge on 13 March 2021

Protests, with many participants being from the Querdenken movement, took place in Berlin, Dresden, Düsseldorf, Hannover, Munich, Stuttgart, and other cities. The Higher Administrative Court had banned the Querdenken demonstration in Dresden, on the grounds of the risk of infection for participants, police and passers-by – organizers had projected about 3,000 to 5,000 participants, far above the maximum of 1,000 set by coronavirus regulations in the state. In spite of the ban, at the Congress Center near the state parliament, over 1,000 demonstrators gathered according to police estimates. There were reports of a tense mood as hundreds of demonstrators began to march, with many flouting the mask and physical distance requirements. The march changed its course several times as a reaction to police closing off streets; cries "The pandemic is over" were heard. Six water cannons were positioned to protect a nearby COVID-19 vaccination center. In addition, several hundred protesters rallied in the inner city. They were stopped by police and subjected to identity checks. Altogether, the day in Dresden ended with twelve injured police and three arrests for attacks on police.

State Minister for Economy and Second Deputy Martin Dulig spoke on Twitter of "shocking images" of the attacks. State parliamentarian de:Kerstin Köditz of the Left Party criticized what she saw as the inability of the Ministry of the Interior and the police to implement the ban, and announced that her party would request a special meeting of the state committee on internal affairs.

A demonstration at the Munich state parliament was broken up by police for having exceeded, with about 2,500 protesters attending, the permitted number of 500 protesters.

=== 20 March 2021, Kassel ===
Organizers under the name of "Freie Bürger Kassel – Grundrechte und Demokratie" ("Free Citizens Kassel – Basic Rights and Democracy") had registered the rally in Kassel for the day, giving a number of up to 17,500 expected participants; the Querdenken movement acted as co-organizers. A Higher Administrative Court had overturned a prohibition by local authorities but only allowed two rallies, capped at 5,000 and 1,000 participants, to be held at adjacent locations outside the city centre, and mandated physical distancing rules and the wearing of nose-and-mouth covers. An illegal demonstration with over 20,000 participants marched through the city center, with many protesters not maintaining physical distancing nor heeding the mask requirement. Several police and journalists were attacked; police used batons and pepper spray but largely held back, apparently to prevent the situation from escalating. There were also scuffles with counterprotesters, which led to the use of water cannon by police away from the main protest site. Police stated that it had made 15 arrests. State parliamentarian de:Günter Rudolph of the Social Democrats criticized the police strategy as "absolutely incomprehensible retreat of the state".

A social media uproar ensued from video footage showing police removing a roadblock by counterprotesters on bicycles; police stated that they would investigate the event.

=== 3 April 2021, Stuttgart ===
Before the rally, the Health Ministry of Baden-Württemberg had told Stuttgart authorities that the state's coronavirus regulations could be used in several ways to prohibit the large Querdenken demonstration that was anticipated; his counterpart, however, did not see these options as viable. By the early afternoon, the initial police estimate of 2,500 participants at the main rally on the Cannstatter Wasen was exceeded, later reaching over 10,000. Here and at other, smaller rallies elsewhere in the city, coronavirus regulations on nose and mouth covering and physical distancing were largely ignored by protesters, but police mostly did not enforce the rules as protests largely remained peaceful. A police spokesman later said that the decision had been part of the strategy to prevent the march towards the Wasen from passing instead through the inner city. A counter-demonstration attempted to prevent the march to the Wasen, but were dispersed by police after having rejected the offer of an alternative location. ARD Newsroom chief editor de:Marcus Bornheim condemned an attack on a team of journalists. There were also reports of stones being thrown; police was to examine related footage.

=== 11 April 2021, Frankfurt am Main ===
On Sunday, 11 April 2021, in Frankfurt am Main, the Querdenken movement held a largely peaceful demonstration with around 500 people, expressing their scepticism towards vaccinations, PCR tests, corona measures, and the media supposedly insufficiently representing their critical stances and too seldom reporting on the psychological effects of the corona measures extending up to suicides of minors.

=== 21 April 2021, Berlin ===
Critics of pandemic related policies had registered several rallies in the city. On the day, the Bundestag discussed and passed a toughening of the Infection Protection Act. The ban on a Querdenken rally was upheld by the administrative court, which argued that on the basis of rallies held since October 2020, participants would likely violate the law. The protest had been widely advertised on social media. Police numbered approximately 2,200 from several states, which was seen by observers as contributing to a tense atmosphere at the start.

A rally on Straße des 17. Juni, near the government precinct, attracted over 8,000 (or, according to other sources, around 8,000) participants from throughout the country. Due to multiple violations of the physical distancing and nose and mouth covering requirements, police ordered the dispersal of the rally at around noontime. A large number of non-compliant protesters were pushed by police into the Tiergarten area, with several clashes and arrests occurring in the process. A group of about 1,500 to 2,000 protesters later marched to Bellevue Palace; in the late afternoon, this protest was also dissolved by police due to lack of observance of the nose and mouth covering requirement. A spontaneous demonstration that formed at the location was again dissolved by police after having broken through a police cordon. In total, police made around 250 arrests. Participants at the rally included AfD politicians and Bundestag members Stephan Brandner and Hansjörg Müller, former AfD politician Andreas Kalbitz, and new right journalist and activist Jürgen Elsässer.

=== 1 August 2021, Berlin ===
Prior to the day, the courts had upheld a police ban on numerous protests in the city against pandemic measures, including a major protest planned by Querdenken. In its decision, the court stated that Querdenken had a pattern of aiming to attract public attention by violating in particular the social distance requirement and the mask requirement. In spite of the ban, around 5,000 protesters, according to police estimates, took part in marches. Police had deployed about 2,000 officers in riot gear. Some protesters in the Charlottenburg district ignored roadblocks and clashed with police. Water cannon was used to disperse protesters. In total, almost 600 people were arrested, with about 350 further people being briefly detained for identity checking. The following day it transpired that a protester had died in hospital due to a heart attack. According to a preliminary report, his sudden collapse during temporary detention after breaking through a police cordon had not been related to the police action. Over 60 police officers were injured, some of them seriously. United Nations Special Rapporteur Nils Melzer, who had been contacted with multiple videos allegedly showing excessive police violence, said on 5 August that he would ask the German federal government to make a statement regarding the incidents. Also on 5 August, the police force announced that it had started an own investigation into the accusations.

=== 28–29 August 2021, Berlin ===
Authorities announced the previous day that they had banned 13 demonstrations, including several by Querdenken. One of the four appeals lodged at the local administrative court was successful, with the judges saying that no negative experiences had been made with that particular group. The date was considered sensitive for being the first anniversary of major protests in which some protesters had occupied the front of the Reichstag parliament building.

Nevertheless, in anticipation of major illegal protests, a total of 4,200 police officers were on standby. More than 2,000 riot police were walking alongside protesters to prevent them from reaching the tightly sealed government precinct and the Straße des 17. Juni.

A protest of several thousands commenced from Volkspark Friedrichshain according to police, with reporters observing that some protesters had already gathered elsewhere to pass by the park. Protesters carried flags and banners. In Moabit, about 1,000 protesters tried to break a police road block on the Lessingbrücke (Lessing Bridge). Violent scuffles broke out; police used pepper spray, causing protesters to leave soon after. A small number of protesters reached the Reichstag. Another approximately 500 protesters passed by the Charité hospital, where several hundred chanted "Drosten raus!" ("Drosten out!"), referring to virologist Christian Drosten who had long been a target for the ire of protesters. Smaller scattered crowds of protesters were also present.

In total, police made over 100 temporary arrests on the day. Four police were reportedly injured.

On 29 August, protests drew again several thousand people, with some groups not heeding the physical distancing and the nose-and-mouth covering requirements. Police deployed a helicopter and about 2,200 officers. A rally of several hundred protesters in the morning in Mitte was eventually dissolved by police; only a rally against a dog leash requirement had been registered with authorities. During their subsequent illegal march in smaller groups southward to the inner city, protesters moved in a flexible fashion avoiding police road blocks, in what appeared to be an attempt to sidestep police action. As on the previous day, important government buildings had been sealed off. Protesters were decrying what they called "vaccination apartheid", referring to government plans to relax certain restrictions only for the vaccinated and those who had recovered from a COVID-19 infection. Protesters also shouted "hands off our children", referring to the exhortations of the Berlin government to those above the age of 12 to get vaccinated. Police made over 160 arrests, 80 of which were in a police kettling in Pankow.

=== September 2021, Berlin and other cities ===
Several small protests took place at schools, targeting the vaccination efforts of mobile teams and taking particular aim at the vaccination of children and youths from the age of 12 which had been recommended in the guidelines of the German vaccination commission STIKO since 16 August. On 13 September in Berlin, on occasion of the start of a week-long federal campaign for vaccination, President Frank-Walter Steinmeier was verbally abused by protesters while visiting a school. Protesters were stopped from entering the vaccination room by a helper of the medical team, and school administrators were able to make them leave before the alarmed police arrived. Several students were reported to have felt intimidated by the protesters. Protests also took place at other schools, meeting with sharp criticism by authorities.

=== 11 December 2021, Hamburg ===
Up to 8,000 protesters marched through the city, many of whom had come from elsewhere. Almost none of them was wearing a mask, but the physical distancing requirement was largely kept. The self-professed causes of the protesters included opposition to government plans for a general vaccine mandate, and concerns about having to have their children vaccinated. Police said that the demonstration ended peacefully.

=== 13 December 2021, Mannheim and other cities ===
Around 2,000 protesters turned up in the evening in Mannheim for a rally that had been advertised on Telegram messaging software, and not been registered with authorities. Police, who were surprised about the turnout, believed it to have been organized by the Querdenken movement. Around an hour into the protest, authorities told the protesters that the march was banned and that they would be banned from the city center. The growing group of protesters ignored the announcement, splintering into smaller groups as they marched. Some tried to push through a police barrier, where three of a total of six police officers were injured. Police arrested about 120 people for refusing to comply with police orders. Protests also took place in the Eastern German cities of Magdeburg (around 3,500 protesters) and Rostock (around 2,900 protesters).

=== 18 December 2021, Hamburg and other cities ===
Around 11,500 protesters joined a rally under the banner "Enough! Hands off our children" against the COVID-19 vaccination of children from the age of five, which had commenced the same week. Participants mostly adhered to coronavirus regulations. There were smaller counter-protests of several hundred across the city. A protest in Cottbus by well over 3,000 participants was dissolved by police due to its size; some protesters were verbally aggressive and launched pyrotechnics. Several persons known to belong to the radical far-right were detained. There were also protests in Düsseldorf and Freiburg.

=== 20 December 2021, Rostock and other cities ===
Around 10,000 participants gathered in Rostock for an unauthorized protest. Other cities in the state of Mecklenburg-Western Pomerania also saw protests, totalling over 7,000 participants. Protesters in Mannheim resisted an attempt by police to end their unauthorized march through the city; several police were injured, with one being admitted to hospital.

=== 26 December 2021, Schweinfurt ===
Several hundred protesters joined an unauthorized protest in Schweinfurt in the evening. A four-year-old child whose mother had tried to break through a police barrier was treated for pepper spray exposure; the mother was charged. Eight police were injured and eight protesters detained in what the police called a "heated, partly hostile atmosphere".

=== 15 January 2022, Düsseldorf and other cities ===
A largely peaceful protest against vaccine mandates in Düsseldorf saw an estimated 7,000 participants. In Hamburg, an estimated 3,000 participants joined a protest against COVID-19 measures and vaccine mandates, ignoring a ban that authorities had issued on account of the high prevalence of the Omicron variant in the city, and which had been upheld in a court appeal. Most protesters in Hamburg did not wear masks and there were some scuffles with police. A counter-demonstration was joined by more than 2,900 people. In Freiburg, a protest against coronavirus measures attracted about 6,000 people, with about 2,500 joining a counter-protest.

== Government, media and public analyses ==
In response to a parliamentary request from the Left Party, the Federal Office for the Protection of the Constitution (BfV) advised in early September 2020 that extreme-right spokespersons had been present at over 90 protests against coronavirus-related restrictions since the end of April 2020. The BfV said further that the mobilization calls of right-wing extremists had broadened and intensified for the Berlin 29 August rally as compared to the Berlin 1 August rally, but had met with very limited success in their goal of "connecting with democratic protests". It considered such a success at future rallies possible, though, and would continue its monitoring with a view to such developments.

The Baden-Württemberg State Office for the Protection of the Constitution began to observe the core administrative layer of Querdenken in December 2020; at that time, Minister of the Interior Thomas Strobl justified this step with the presence of radical tendencies (fostering extremist and conspiracy-ideological narratives) within the movement. He emphasized that the observation did not include the participants at rallies. Later on the Bavarian Office for the Protection of the Constitution began also to observe the movement. From at least April 2021 the Berlin State Office for the Protection of the Constitution targeted radical fractions of the movement with intelligence methods. On 28 April, the BfV announced that it had placed parts of the Querdenken movement under countrywide observation in a newly created category, due to its questioning of the legitimacy of the state.

In an interview in May 2020, law professor Oliver Lepsius said that peaceful dissent always had to be allowed in a democracy, and that violations of the law by single individuals were a well-known phenomenon and could not be used to prohibit demonstrations. In his view, basic rights had "definitely" been endangered in the first months of the pandemic, but that the freedom of speech had been upheld throughout the crisis. Comparisons of government corona policies to Nazi-era policies, as made by some of the protesters, were in no way appropriate.

In May 2020, media professor Bernhard Pörksen told the dpa press agency that labeling the protesters as "paranoids", "hysterics", or similar wholesale attacks would only antagonize them and only serve to make it more difficult to reach the important goal of cooling down the debate. There should, he said, be no tolerance towards antisemitic or radical far-right views.

An article in the Tagesspiegel from May 2020 pointed out that the right-wing populist Alternative for Germany (AfD) party was trying to capitalize on the protests, but that in doing so it was entering a difficult balancing act, as it did not want to be seen as overtly supporting conspiracy theorists.

In a commentary published by Deutschlandfunk on 30 August, journalist and jurist Heribert Prantl expressed the view that the basic right to demonstrate guaranteed by the German constitution was not diminished by the pandemic situation, and that even "abstruse" demands by Querdenken protesters such as the immediate resignation of the German government had to be tolerated. Violence and Volksverhetzung were however not to be tolerated. Prantl expected from and demanded of the peaceful demonstrators, their organisers, and the police, that they confer and consider concepts and strategies to separate the peaceful demonstrators from unpeaceful people or volksverhetzende Rechtsextremisten (far-right inciters of hatred against segments of the population).

In an interview with Deutschlandfunk in late December 2020, Josef Schuster, President of the Central Council of Jews in Germany said, when being asked why a small but vocal part of the population believed that they were living in a dictatorship – exemplified by Querdenken protests where protesters were wearing yellow stars resembling the Star of David to suggest that they were being persecuted, and a recent case of a protester who had likened herself to resistance fighter against Nazi Germany, Sophie Scholl – that complete ignorance on history was the only reason he could conceive. He further said that while he would "in theory" understand those who demonstrated against a curtailing of basic rights – which he considered minor – he would consider it beyond the limits of what he could accept if they were infiltrated by proponents of extreme-right views and antisemitic conspiracy theories.

The advance of protesters to the German parliament building entrance at the demonstration on 29 August 2020, and the storming of the US Capitol on 6 January 2021, were seen in an opinion piece in The New York Times to have parallels, crucially a deep distrust in officials and a belief in conspiracy theories, in particular QAnon.

A joint study by ZEW and HU Berlin, published in February 2021, concluded that between 16,000 and 21,000 coronavirus infections could have been prevented by Christmas if two large rallies in Berlin and Leipzig in November 2020 had not taken place. The methodology of the study and its conclusions were criticized by two academics as not solid.

In an interview published in April 2021, author and expert on far-right movements Karolin Schwarz stated that Querdenken was exhibiting cognitive dissonance insofar as the movement readily adopted those reports from mainstream media that fitted its narrative, even though it considered the same media as uncritically reporting whatever the government wanted them to report. She said that attacks on journalists had become "standard" at Querdenken protests. She opined that the movement was justifying these attacks through espousing the notion that it was them, not the media, who stood for freedom, or through narratives – which she dismissed as false – that there had been agent provocateurs at rallies. She said that police was falling short in fulfilling its legal requirement to protect journalists at Querdenken rallies, and that no attempts were made by the movement to exclude right-wing extremists from demonstrations. She further said that the stories propagated at Querdenken rallies were at least in contravention of the German constitution, a recurring theme being the intention of the protesters to have the people in power be ousted in a putsch; and that, while rallies did not feature classical narratives of the extreme right, antisemitic conspiracy stories were being disseminated.

Broadcaster Bayerischer Rundfunk cited in May 2021 from an interview with historian Jens-Christian Wagner. In it, Wagner pointed to a social dimension of the Querdenken protests, arguing that since the protesters had not lost "really important basic rights" such as the freedom of speech and the right of vote, it was more likely that they were concerned by consumer rights such as going to restaurants, going shopping or flying for tourism. He considered this to be plausible on the grounds of many protesters belonging to the well-earning middle class. He further said that the protesters' understanding of basic rights was directed primarily "against the fundamental idea of societal solidarity" and further against the government which they, due to being under the influence of "conspiracy legends", considered to be a fascist dictatorship.

On 16 September 2021, Facebook moved to delete nearly 150 accounts and groups connected to Querdenken on Facebook and Instagram, including those of Michael Ballweg, the movement's founder. Nathaniel Gleicher, Facebook's head of security policy, called it the first action worldwide against a group that is causing a "coordinated damaging of society".

== Miscellany ==
In a tweet posted on 1 August 2020, Saskia Esken, co-leader of the Social Democrats, referred to participants of the Berlin rally on that day as "Covidioten", the German equivalent of covidiots. Hundreds of citizens filed complaints for insult; prosecutors did not start investigations, however, as they regarded this utterance as being covered under freedom of speech laws.

The term Coronadiktatur ("corona dictatorship"), which had gained popularity with protesters when referring to the German government, was one of two selected words for the Un-word of the year of 2020.

The attacks on journalists were the main reason why Germany slipped from eleventh to 13th place in the Press Freedom Index of Reporters Without Borders, according to a report published on 20 April 2021.

From within the Querdenken scene, a new party, de:Basisdemokratische Partei Deutschland ("Die Basis") was founded in July 2020. It participated in the day of protests in Berlin on 28 August 2021 with a rally of about 2,000 participants. The party participated in the 2021 German federal election achieving 1.4% of the vote federally and thus failing to surpass the electoral threshold.

== See also ==
- Michael Kretschmer - target of related assassination plot
- QAnon - an American political conspiracy theory and political movement
