= Attila Hildmann =

German vegan cookbook author and conspiracy theorist (born 1981)

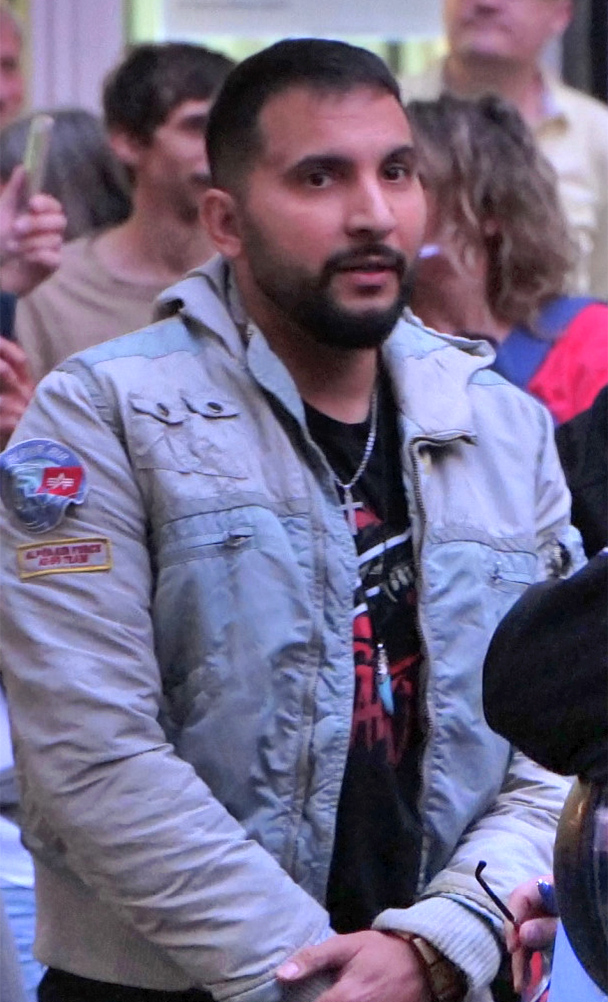
- Hildmann at a protest in 2020
- Born: Hüseyin Yıldırım; 22 April 1981 (age 45); West Berlin, West Germany
- Citizenship: Germany
- Occupation: Cookbook author
- Known for: Vegan cookbooks; Conspiracy theories; Anti-Semitic statements

Attila Klaus Peter Hildmann (born 22 April 1981) is a German vegan cookbook author and far-right conspiracy theorist. He wrote his first cookbook in 2009, and his book Vegan for Fun was named cookbook of the year by the Vegetarierbund Deutschland in 2012. He subsequently featured in numerous television programs and talk shows.

During the COVID-19 pandemic, Hildmann emerged as a disseminator of conspiracy ideologies surrounding the virus. He has described himself as "ultra right-wing" and as a German nationalist. He has been repeatedly characterized as antisemitic and has been on the run since February 2021, when German prosecutors issued a European arrest warrant for his arrest. He evaded the arrest warrant by leaving for Turkey, which announced in 2023 that it would not extradite him because of his Turkish citizenship.

== Biography ==
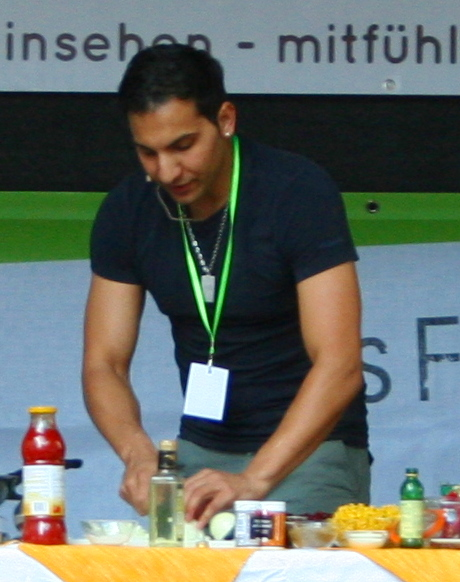
Hildmann cooking at Veggie Street Day in Dortmund, 2010

=== Early life and career ===
Hildmann was born as Hüseyin Yıldırım in Berlin-Kreuzberg. Of Turkish descent, he was given away shortly after birth and raised by German adoptive parents since age two. Hildmann grew up Evangelical, participating in a Pfadfinder group as a child, but later identified as irreligious. According to Hildmann, he was bullied and physically attacked for his Turkish background and in his youth, he spent three months in juvenile jail detention on theft charges. He graduated OSZ Lise Meitner, where Hildmann was editor-in-chief of the school newspaper Limes, having once interviewed Berlin mayor Walter Momper. He studied for a diploma in physics at the Free University of Berlin but failed to graduate.

Hildmann became vegetarian after witnessing his adoptive father die of a heart attack whilst on a ski trip in 2000. He attributed the death to excessive meat consumption resulting in hypercholesterolemia (high cholesterol). Fearing the same fate and being heavily overweight, he renounced meat and fish products, and began to exercise regularly, losing 35 kg in weight. Over time, he abstained from consuming almost all animal products and became primarily vegan.

In 2009, Hildmann wrote his first vegan cookbook. In 2012, his Vegan for Fun was named cookbook of the year by Vegetarierbund Deutschland, the German branch of the International Vegetarian Union.

Hildmann appears in YouTube videos and has been featured in numerous television programs and talk shows, including Maischberger, TV total, ZDF's Volle Kanne, SWR's Nachtcafé, and Westdeutscher Rundfunk's daheim + unterwegs. In March 2016, he was a contestant in the TV show Let's Dance.

In April 2017, Hildmann participated in the TV show Schlag den Star against Luke Mockridge.

=== Controversies and conspiracy theories ===
In 2015, Hildmann commented on the European migrant crisis, stating: "Integration in Germany is a sensitive issue because of the German past, resulting in a current self-mutilation of German values and culture." This remark was criticized by Bayerischer Rundfunk as a "symbiosis of right-wing extremism with boundless love for animals".

Hildmann spread conspiracy theories about the COVID-19 pandemic in 2020. In June 2020, Hildmann shared antisemitic conspiracy theories, calling himself a German nationalist and saying that Jews wanted 'to exterminate the German race'. His public sharing of these views have resulted in German police pursuing criminal charges against him and loss of revenue; brands he served as spokesman for have severed ties with him. He has denied the Holocaust.

Hildmann claimed in August 2020 during the closure of the Pergamon Altar in Berlin, caused by COVID-19, that satanic rituals were performed at night and that the altar was a "centre of global satanists and Corona criminals". BBC noted that several German media sources connected these claims to cases of vandalism against the museum that occurred later, on 3 October, the national holiday.

He has also accused the German government of working in the service of Bill Gates to promote forced COVID-19 vaccinations and a surveillance state. After being banned from mainstream social media, Hildmann built a network of cross-posting accounts on Telegram, and uploads antisemitic videos on "wtube", a hate speech platform hidden by Cloudflare and evading German judicial authorities.

On 29 August 2020, Hildmann was arrested at a COVID-19 conspiracy protest outside the Russian embassy in Berlin after protestors assaulted seven police officers and threw rocks and glass at the embassy and police.

=== Criminal prosecution and escape to Turkey ===
In November 2020 Berlin police searched his home and confiscated six computers as well as several cellphones, after taking over investigations from Brandenburg authorities. An arrest warrant for slander, harassment and incitement to racial hatred (German: Beleidigung, Bedrohung und Volksverhetzung) was finally issued in February 2021, but Hildmann had been absent from his home for several weeks at this time. A betrayal of state secrets by an unidentified sympathizer in the judiciary was suspected because of this. Hildmann moved to Turkey in early 2021, evading prosecution in Germany.

His Telegram channel was blocked in June 2021 by unknown means, leaving Hildemann unable to communicate with his c. 100,000 followers on that platform. In July 2021 WDR and Süddeutsche Zeitung reported that Berlin authorities were investigating a total of 80 alleged criminal acts of Hildmann. An extradition was considered unlikely at the time due to his alleged dual (German and Turkish) citizenship. In the fall of 2022 media reported that this was in fact incorrect and that public prosecutors had known this fact for more than half a year by that point: Hildmann only has German citizenship.

In April 2023 it was reported that the Turkish government had refused a request for extradition by German authorities on grounds of Hildmann's supposed Turkish citizenship. German public prosecutors did not know the reason for the conflicting statements issued by Turkish authorities.

== Books ==
- Attila Hildmann (2009), Vegan-Kochbuch. Cholesterinbewusst, laktosefrei und klimafreundlich kochen (in German), vol. 1, Aachen: Shaker Media, ISBN 978-3-86858-217-8
- Attila Hildmann (2009), Vegan-Kochbuch. Cholesterinbewusst, laktosefrei und klimafreundlich kochen (in German), vol. 2, Aachen: Shaker Media, ISBN 978-3-86858-502-5
- Attila Hildmann (2010), Vegan-Kochbuch. Cholesterinbewusst, laktosefrei und klimafreundlich kochen (in German), vol. 3 Norderstedt: Books on Demand, ISBN 978-3-8423-3835-7.
- Attila Hildmann (2011), Vegan for Fun. Vegane Küche die Spaß macht (in German), Hilden Becker Joest Volk Verlag, ISBN 978-3-938100-71-4.
- Attila Hildmann (2012), Vegan for Fit. Attila Hildmanns 30-Tage-Challenge. Vegetarisch und cholesterinfrei zu einem neuen Körpergefühl (in German), Hilden: Becker Joest Volk Verlag, ISBN 978-3-938100-81-3
- Attila Hildmann (2013), Vegan for Youth. Die Attila Hildmann Triät. Schlanker, gesünder und messbar jünger in 60 Tagen (in German), Hilden: Becker Joest Volk Verlag, ISBN 978-3-938100-91-2
- Attila Hildmann (2014), Vegan to Go. Schnell, einfach, lecker (in German), Hilden: Becker Joest Volk Verlag, ISBN 978-3-95453-101-1
- Attila Hildmann (2015) (in German), Vegan for Starters. Die einfachsten und beliebtesten Rezepte aus vier Kochbüchern, Hilden, Beck Joest Volk Verlag, ISBN 978-3-954530-93-9
- Attila Hildmann (2015) (in German), Vegan Italian Style. Moderne italienische Küche, Hilden, Becker Joest Volk Verlag, ISBN 978-3-95453-111-0.
- Attila Hildmann (2016) (in German), Vegan Smoothies, Shakes, and Ice Cream - Green Smoothies und Superfoods in ihrer leckersten Form aus der Bestsellerküche von Attila Hildmann, Hilden, Becker Joest Volk Verlag, ISBN 978-3-95453-121-9.
- Attila Hildmann (2016) (in German), Vegan for Fit Gipfelstürmer - Die 7-Tage-Detox-Diät, Hilden, Becker Joest Volk Verlag, ISBN 978-3-95453-131-8.
