= Passauer Neue Presse =

German newspaper in Bavaria

- Type: Daily newspaper
- President: Simone Tucci-Diekmann
- Editor-in-chief: Martin Wanninger
- Founded: 1946
- Circulation: 133,208 (as of 2024)
- Website: https://www.pnp.de

Passauer Neue Presse is a German newspaper established in 1946. It reports local news from the Passau region of Bavaria as well as international news.

They established a YouTube channel on December 8, 2008, which distributes news in a video format. A digital edition is published as PNP.de.
