= Badische Zeitung =

German newspaper in Baden-Württemberg

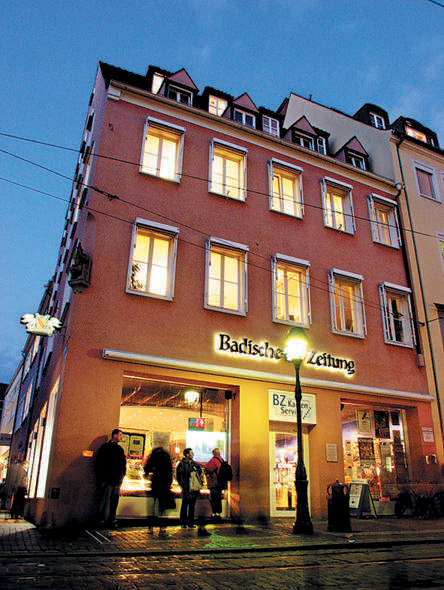
- Bzhaus
- Type: Daily newspaper
- Owner(s): Badischer Verlag GmbH & Co. KG
- Publisher: Dr. Christian H. Hodeige
- President: Wolfgang Poppen; Hans-Otto Holz
- Editor-in-chief: Caroline Buchheim, Stephan Schröter
- Deputy editor: Thomas Fricker; Holger Knöferl
- Founded: January 1946
- Language: German
- City: Freiburg im Breisgau
- Country: Germany
- Circulation: 145,825 (as of Q4 2014)
- Readership: 409,000
- OCLC number: 11975787
- Website: www.badische-zeitung.de

The Badische Zeitung (Baden Newspaper) is a German newspaper based in Freiburg im Breisgau, covering the South Western part of Germany and the Black Forest region. It has a circulation of 145,825 and a readership of 409,000. The paper was founded in January 1946.

In December 2013, a cartoon by Horst Haitzinger published in the Badische Zeitung was honored by the Simon Wiesenthal Center as one of the top 10 antisemitic and anti-Israeli slurs of 2013 because it appeared in various newspapers, depicted the Prime Minister Israeli Benjamin Netanyahu as the poisoner of the depicted Peace Doves.
