= Hansjörg Müller =

German politician

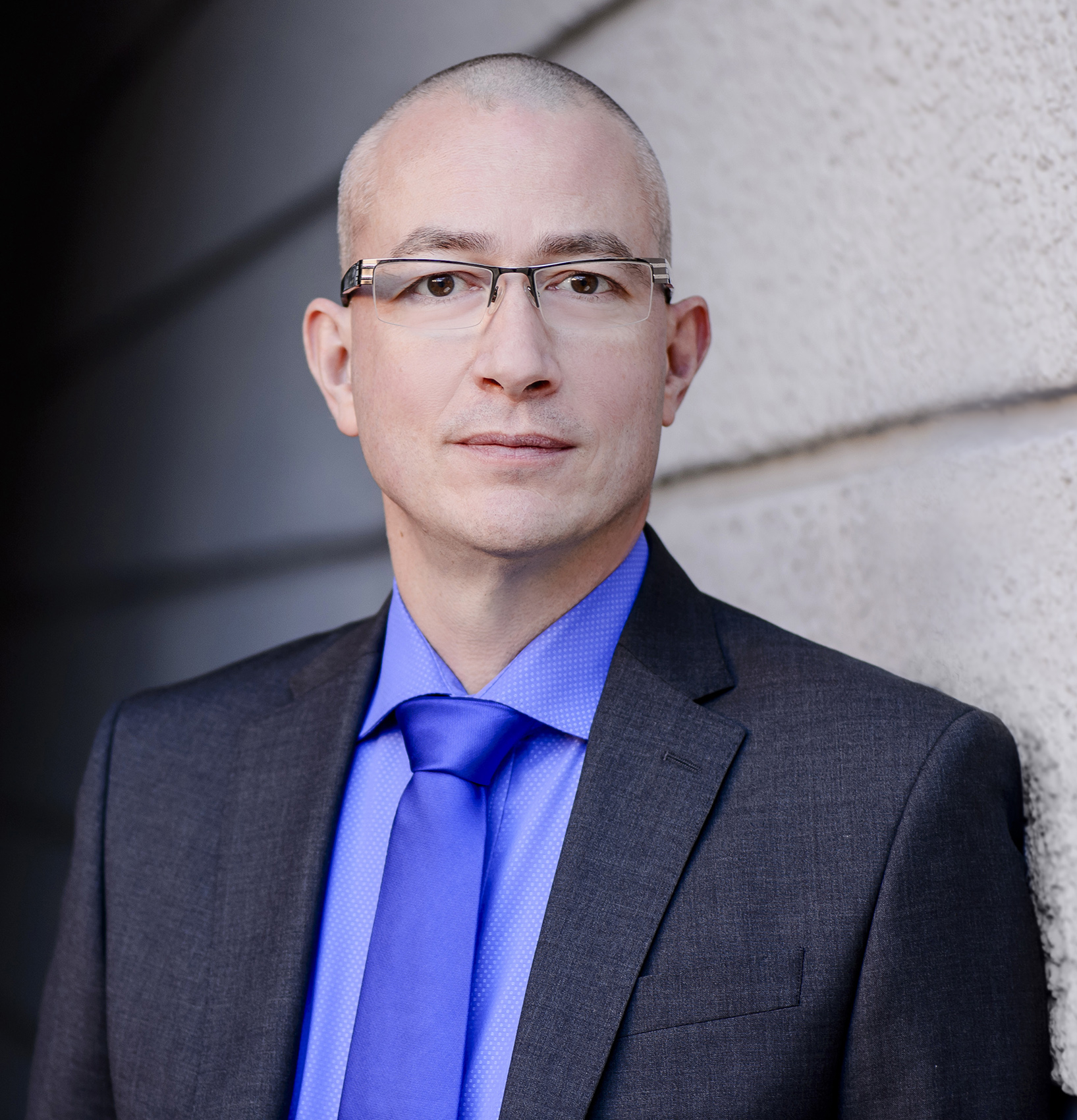
- Hansjörg Müller in 2015

Member of the Bundestag
- Incumbent
- Assumed office 24 October 2017

Personal details
- Born: 30 April 1968 (age 57) Treuchtlingen, West Germany (now Germany)
- Party: AfD

Hansjörg Gerhard Georg Müller (born 30 April 1968) is a German right-wing politician (AfD).

He belongs to the right-wing extremist AfD movement Der Flügel.

== Life ==
Müller was born in Treuchtlingen, Bavaria. Hansjörg Müller has served as a member of the Bundestag from the state of Bavaria from 2017 to 2021. He was a member of the Committee for Economics and Energy.
