= Dieter Rucht =

German sociologist

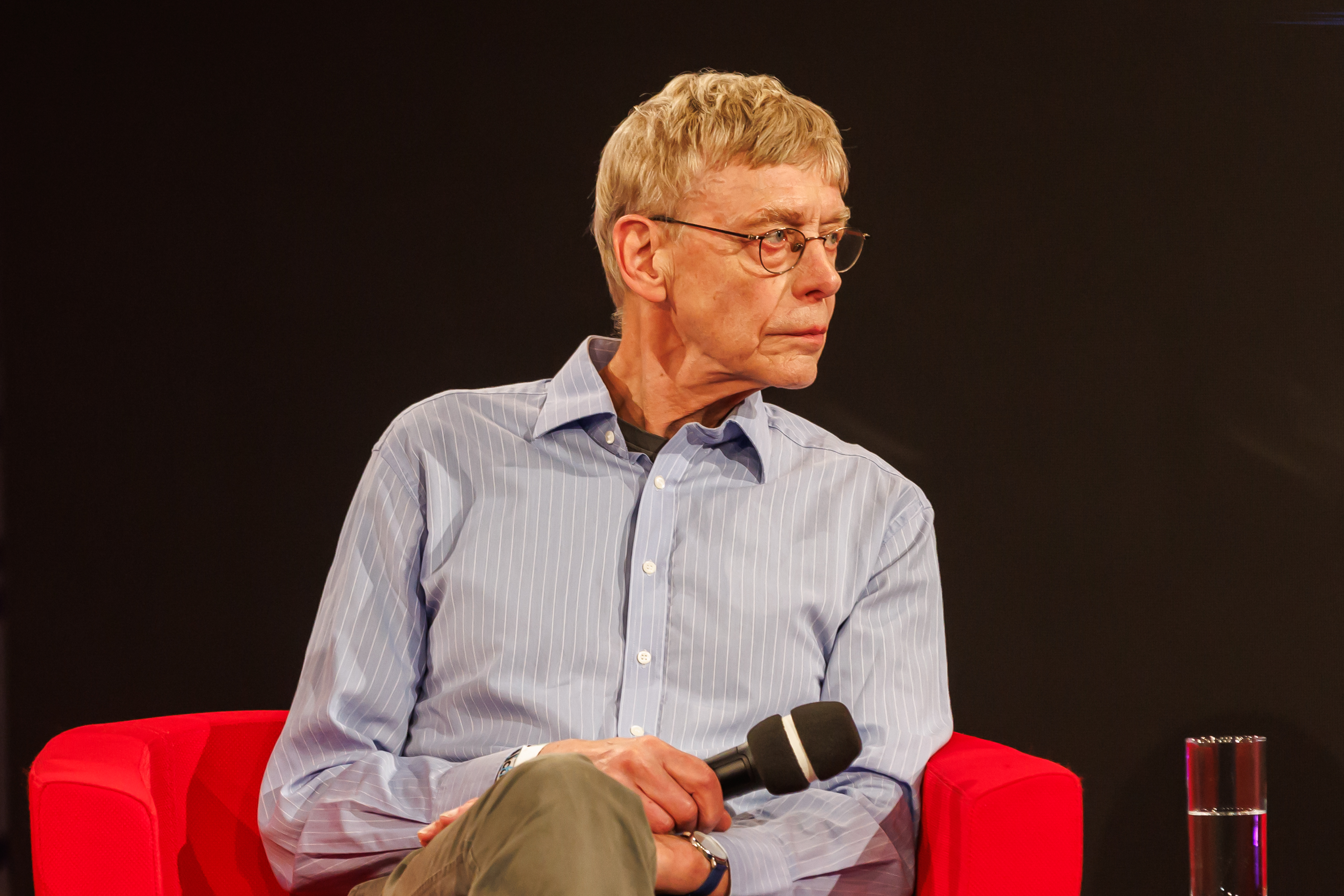
Rucht in 2024

Dieter Rucht (born 26 June 1946 in Kempten) is a German sociologist. He is known for his contributions to the protest and social movement literature. Until his retirement in June 2011, he was co-director of the research group Civil Society, Citizenship, and Political Mobilization in Europe at the Social Science Research Center Berlin (WZB) and (since 2001) honorary professor at the institute of sociology of the Free University of Berlin (department of political and social sciences).

Rucht taught and conducted research in Munich, Berlin, Cambridge (Harvard University), Paris (EHESS) and Ann Arbor (University of Michigan).

== Publications (selection) ==
- as an editor jointly with Donatella della Porta and Hanspeter Kriesi: Social Movements in a Globalizing world. London: Palgrave Macmillan, 2009, ISBN 9780230235311; 023023531X
- as an editor jointly with Wim Van De Donk, Brian D. Loader and Paul G. Nixon: Cyberprotest: New media, citizens and social movements. London: Routledge, 2004
- as an editor jointly with Stefaan Walgrave: The World Says No to War. University of Minnesota, Minneapolis/London 2010, ISBN 978-0-8166-5095-8
- Modernisierung und neue soziale Bewegungen. Deutschland, Frankreich und USA im Vergleich. Campus-Verlag, Frankfurt am Main u. a. 1997, ISBN 3-593-35171-4 (Theorie und Gesellschaft 32)
