= Mittelbayerische Zeitung =

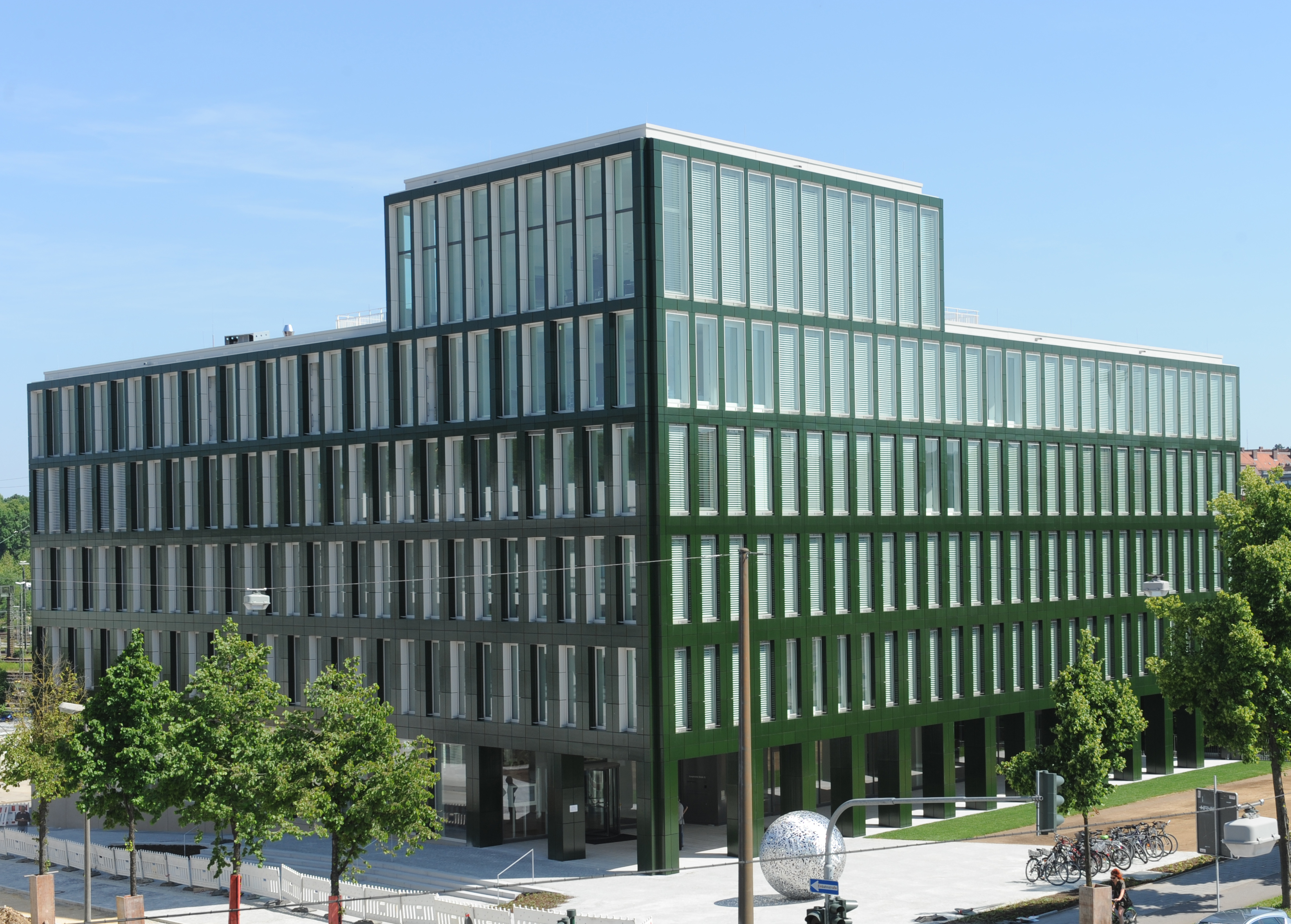
Headquarters of the Mittelbayerische Zeitung in Regensburg

Mittelbayerische Zeitung is a regional newspaper for Bavaria, Germany, founded in 1945 by Karl Friedrich Esser. Headquartered in Regensburg, the paper employs 550 and is owned by Mittelbayerischer Verlag KG.

The online version can be reached at mittelbayerische.de. There is a paywall installed, but four articles per month are free.
