= Campact =

German non-governmental organization

- Established: 2004 (22 years ago)
- Legal status: Registered association
- Headquarters: Verden
- Country: Germany
- Membership: 12 (2022)
- Chairpersons: Christoph Bautz, Astrid Deilmann, Daphne Heinsen, Felix Kolb
- Revenue: 24,629,510.37 (2024)
- Total Assets: 9,524,256.13 (2024)
- Employees: 126 (2024)
- Awards: Theodor Heuss Medal
- Website: www.campact.de

Campact is a German non-governmental organization that aims at creating political pressure in a wide variety of issues through mass digital mobilization. The origins of the organisation and of the first activists are in the anti-nuclear- and environmental movement but soon Campact started to address a variety of topics.

One of its founders, Christoph Bautz, cited MoveOn as inspiration for the founding of the movement in 2004. One of its successful and better-known campaigns targeted the Transatlantic Trade and Investment Partnership (TTIP). In October 2019 Campact lost its non-profit status, but was not lastingly hurt in its operations due to a substantial growth in donations.

== Aims ==
Campact has organized campaigns on a wide range of topics, which included support for the anti-nuclear movement, environmental movement, finance politics, press freedom, quality of healthcare, and animal welfare, as well as fighting online hate speech. Before the 2021 German federal election, it launched a campaign to prevent several candidates from gaining a seat in the Bundestag (see section Campaign to prevent 2021 federal election candidates below).

In 2024 Campact donated substantial amounts of money to left-wing political parties, with the SPD receiving €160,000, the Alliance 90/The Greens €233,300 and Die Linke €56,600 as of September 2024.

== Campaign against TTIP ==
In the night of 11 December 2013, Campact started an online campaign against the Transatlantic Trade and Investment Partnership (TTIP). Prior to starting the campaign, Campact had trialed the chances of success of such a campaign by contacting a sample of 5,000 recipients of its newsletter. The first four hours of the campaign saw 60,000 signatures; by 18 July 2014, after steady growth, that number had reached 610,576 as per the Campact homepage. Before the 2014 European Parliament election, Campact collected 485,000 of the 715,000 signatures against TTIP that were handed to election candidates. Campact supporters distributed 6,5 million door signs which warned against TTIP as endangering democracy, health, and freedom. It also referenced the parties' positions towards TTIP.

In 2016, TTIP was put on hold in Germany. That year, Campact was referred to by Politico as "anti-TTIP NGO".

== Loss of non-profit status in 2019 ==
In February 2019, the decision of the Federal Fiscal Court to withdraw the non-profit (Gemeinnützigkeit) status of Attac led to concerns in other non-government organizations that they would likewise lose this status. In anticipation of this, Campact stopped issuing donation certificates for taxation purposes. Campact lost its non-profit status in October 2019. As in the previous case concerning Attac, the Berlin revenue office explained its decision in part by referring to the campaigns not serving the purpose of political education. In response, there were calls to extend the scope of work that non-profit organizations could carry out.

== Stance on Hygienedemos ==
In May 2020, Campact warned its members against attending the Hygienedemos ("hygiene demonstrations"), the name by which many of the early protests over COVID-19 policies in Germany were referred to. In an email to around 2.3 million supporters, managing director Kolb gave two reasons for the warning: first, the regular violations of government-mandated physical distancing measures (wearing of a nose-mouth covering and maintaining a minimum distance of 1.5 metres from other participants) at the rallies; second, the participation of adherents of far-right or extreme-right views in the organization of the Hygienedemos. In an interview with the taz later that month, Kolb mentioned that the email had triggered an unexpectedly vigorous wave of positive and negative responses, while he defended his step.

== Campaign to prevent 2021 federal election candidates ==
On 29 July 2021, co-director Bautz told journalists that the organization would campaign to prevent the re-election of several members of the Christian Democratic Union (CDU), who he did not name, in the 2021 German federal election, for what the organization considered to be their insufficient commitment to fighting climate change.

The campaign would also seek to prevent the election of Hans-Georg Maaßen, also from the CDU, in the district of Suhl – Schmalkalden-Meiningen – Hildburghausen – Sonneberg. Campact has called on The Left and Greens to withdraw their candidates and speak out in favor of SPD politician Frank Ullrich. While Alliance 90/The Greens withdrew their candidate, The Left resisted interference. Campact urged people to write to Prime Minister Bodo Ramelow (The Left) to withdraw his party's candidate. Ramelow opposed this and described the request "to exert influence on a candidate in a free election so that he withdraws his candidacy" as undemocratic and unconstitutional. Maaßen was defeated by Frank Ullrich from the SPD and consequently failed to gain a seat in the Bundestag.

== Funding ==
In 2015, Campact received funding of €7 million, more than three times than in 2012. Despite losing its non-profit status in 2019, the organization continued to grow its income in that year by €2.5 million to €12.6 million, according to its transparency report. The number of donors contributing less than €200 per year was 94 per cent, which press spokeswoman Clara Koschies cited as proof that Campact had remained crowdfunded.

For the year 2024, the activists claimed to have collected €24.6 million in donations from some 3.5 million supporters.
