= Mike Schubert =

German politician (born 1973)

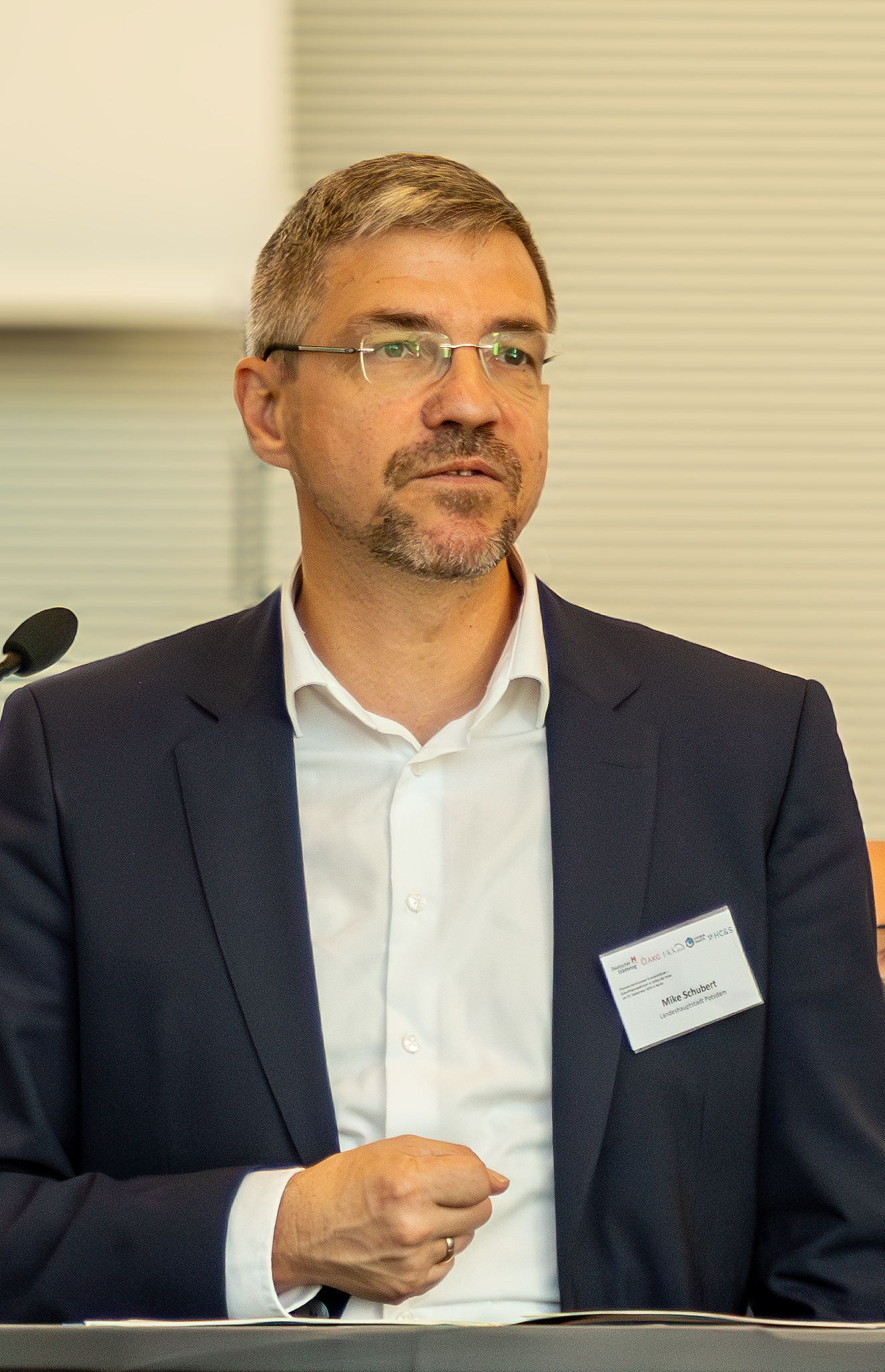
- Schubert in 2024

Lord Mayor of Potsdam
- In office 28 November 2018 – 2 June 2025
- Preceded by: Jann Jakobs
- Succeeded by: Noosha Aubel

Personal details
- Born: 3 February 1973 (age 53) Schwedt, East Germany
- Party: SPD
- Spouse: Simone Schubert
- Children: 2
- Education: University of Potsdam (Dipl.-Pol.)
- Occupation: Politician

Mike Schubert (born February 3, 1973) is a German political scientist and local politician. A member of the Social Democratic Party of Germany, he was the Lord Mayor of the Brandenburg state capital Potsdam from November 2018 to June 2025.

== Early life ==
Mike Schubert was born on February 3, 1973 as the third child of canoeist Manfred Schubert and his wife in Schwedt, Frankfurt district, GDR. His parents were both competitive athletes and had jobs in the city. When Schubert's father moved to Potsdam in 1975 to help set up the ASK Vorwärts canoeing center, the family left Schwedt in August of the same year. Soon after moving to Potsdam, Schubert's mother became seriously ill and died shortly afterwards.

Schubert's father later remarried, and Schubert grew up with two older step-siblings in Potsdam's Zentrum Ost district. He entered the POS 38 (now the Peter-Joseph-Lenné comprehensive school) in 1979, and graduated in 1989 with a secondary school leaving certificate. Immediately afterwards, he began training as an industrial electronics technician in Teltow. After the social change of the GDR, he was forced to abandon his apprenticeship due to loss of career prospects.

After a failed attempt to become self-employed as a retail salesman, Schubert worked as a freelance insurance agent from May 1994 to March 1996. In June 1996, Schubert was called up for military service. After basic training, he extended his service in the IV Corps as a press soldier in Geltow. He passed the aptitude test at the University of Potsdam and began studying economics and political science in 1997, graduating with a degree in political science in 2004. During his studies, Schubert worked for various members of the state parliament. Schubert also spent six months in Kosovo as a reservist. During this time, he used his deployment leave to volunteer for two weeks in the summer of 2002 to help clean up the damage caused by the Elbe flood in Dresden.

== Politics ==
Schubert joined the SPD in 1995. From 1998 to 2016, he was a member of the city council in Potsdam for his party. During this time, he was chairman of the SPD city council parliamentary group from 2005 to 2016. He was also chairman of the Potsdam SPD sub-district from 2008 to 2016.

From October 2004 to October 2009, he led the parliamentary office of Klara Geywitz, a member of the Brandenburg state parliament, and the then Minister President Matthias Platzeck.

Schubert was then employed by the Ministry of the Interior and Municipal Affairs of the State of Brandenburg from 2009 to 2016. As such, he headed the minister's office from November 2009 to March 2011, was the commissioner for civil-military cooperation from April 2011 to November 2013, and was a consultant for disaster control and head of the crisis management coordination center from December 2012. From November 2013 to June 2016, he served as Head of Division for Fire, Civil Protection and Rescue. In September 2016, Schubert became the Alderman for Social Affairs, Health, Youth and Order in the Brandenburg state capital of Potsdam.

On 20 January 2018, he was nominated as a candidate for the upcoming mayoral election at the SPD Potsdam general meeting. The previous Lord Mayor and Schubert's party colleague Jann Jakobs was no longer standing after 16 years in office. Schubert received 32.2 percent of the votes cast in the mayoral election on 23 September. In the resulting run-off election on October 14, he won with 55.3 percent of the votes cast against Martina Trauth (Die Linke). He took office on November 28, 2018 and was succeeded by Noosha Aubel in June 2, 2025.

== Personal life ==
Schubert is married, has two children, and lives in the Golm district of Potsdam.

The DEFA often looked for children at Schubert's school for its productions. As a result, Schubert appeared as a child actor in the TV series Spuk im Hochhaus as a second grader and was seen in episode 2 "Das zornige Sofa".
