= Westdeutsche Zeitung =

German daily newspaper

- Type: Daily newspaper
- Format: Berliner
- Founder: Edmund Busch-du Fallois
- Publisher: Westdeutsche Zeitung GmbH & Co. KG
- Editor-in-chief: Ulli Tückmantel
- Founded: 1887; 139 years ago
- Headquarters: Wuppertal,North Rhine-Westphalia, Germany
- Circulation: 72,314
- Website: www.wz.de

The Westdeutsche Zeitung (WZ; lit. 'West German Newspaper') is one of the largest regional newspapers in North Rhine-Westphalia, Germany. Its headquarters is in Wuppertal with additional offices in Düsseldorf and Krefeld.

In 2001 the circulation of the WZ was 214,000 copies.
