= Neue Ruhr Zeitung =

Regional newspaper in Germany

- Type: Regional newspaper
- Founder: Dietrich Oppenberg
- Founded: 13 July 1946
- Language: German
- Headquarters: Essen
- Country: Germany
- OCLC number: 29010671

Neue Ruhr Zeitung (NRZ) is a regional newspaper based in Essen, Germany. The paper was first published by Ruhr-Verlag, G.m.b.H., on 13 July 1946. The founder and editor of the paper was Dietrich Oppenberg. From 1 September 1949 it became a daily newspaper except Sundays. Neue Ruhr Zeitung is published on weekdays and serves the regions of Rhine Ruhr and Lower Rhine.
