= RedaktionsNetzwerk Deutschland =

German news organization

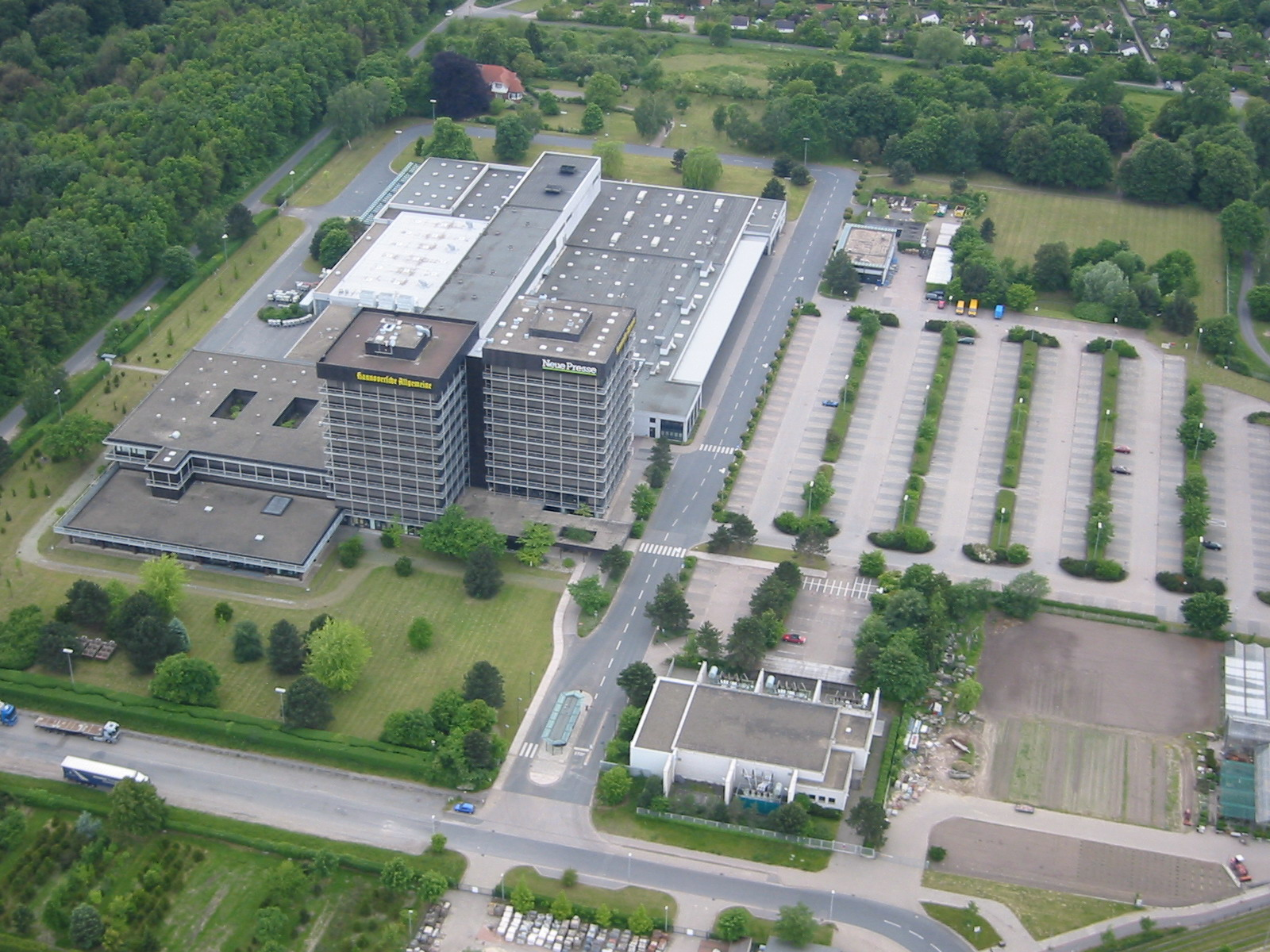
Madsack media group center

The RedaktionsNetzwerk Deutschland (RND) (transl. Editor Network Germany) is the Hanover-based joint corporate newsroom of German Madsack Media Group. The biggest limited partner of Madsack is the Deutsche Druck- und Verlagsgesellschaft, which is fully owned by the Social Democratic Party of Germany (SPD).

Madsack has the majority in regional newspapers with a circulation of roughly a million copies published in Northern and Eastern Germany (states of Niedersachsen, Schleswig-Holstein, Mecklenburg-Vorpommern, Sachsen, Thüringen, Hessen, and Sachsen-Anhalt). Including partner newspapers, RedaktionsNetzwerk Deutschland claims a coverage of roughly four million readers.

In a modernization effort, the central editor office was founded in 2013 with the chief editor of the Hannoversche Allgemeine Zeitung taking over the lead.
