= Second Sons (group) =

Canadian white nationalist group

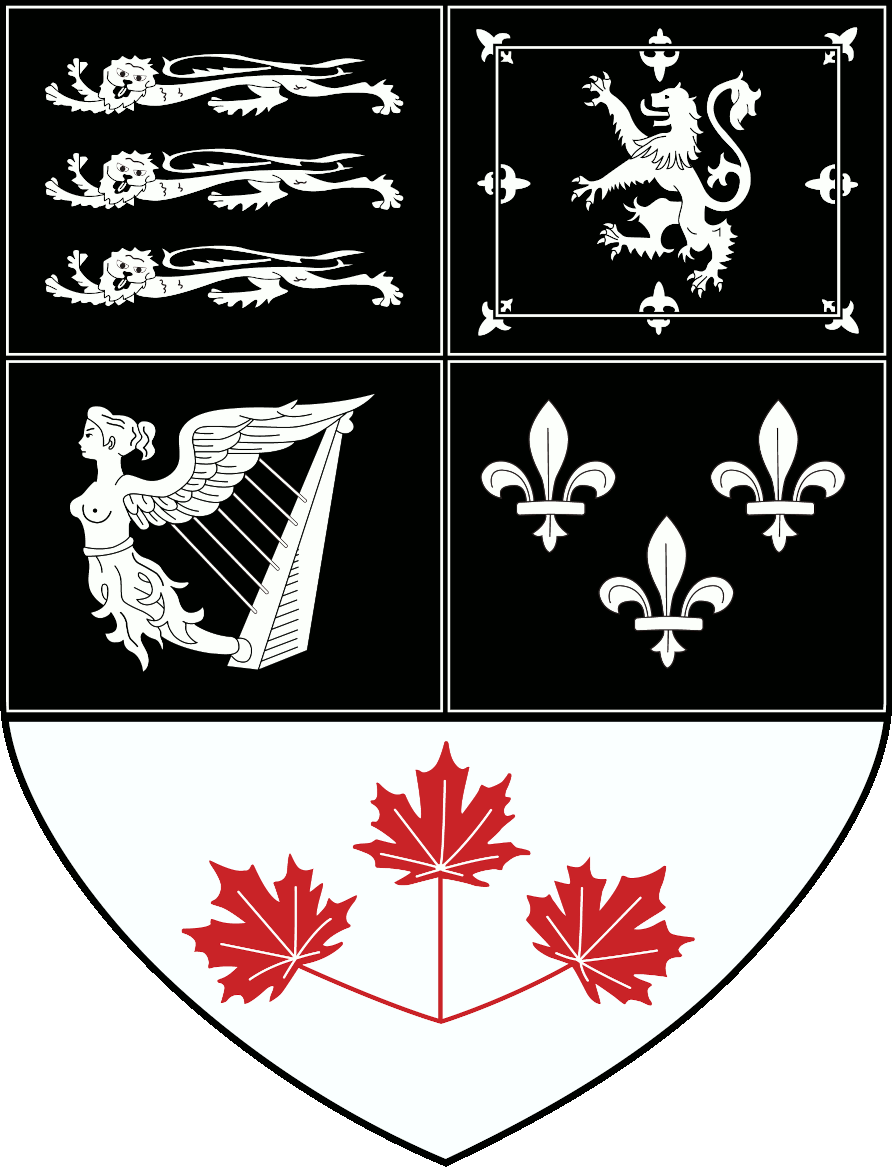
- Founding leader: Jeremy MacKenzie
- Founded: 2024
- Dates active: 2025-Present
- Country: Canada
- Ideology: Canadian nationalism Ultranationalism; White nationalism Right-wing antiglobalism
- Political position: Far-right; Alt-right
- Anthem: Pro Populo Nostro (For our people)
- Status: Active nationwide
- Size: 2,000+ (October 2025)
- Website: www.secondsons.org

The Second Sons is a Canadian men's-only white nationalist group. It was founded in 2024 by Jeremy MacKenzie, a Canadian Army veteran and prominent far-right activist. It is currently the largest white nationalist organization in Canada.

== Organization and aims ==
The Second Sons is a men's only, Canadian nationalist, and white nationalist group. The name is a reference to second-born sons needing to support themselves instead of receiving family wealth, as an analog to foreigners replacing them and reaping the "fruits and benefits" of Canadian society. The group operates chapters throughout the country, using gyms as meet-up spots and to train their fitness via martial arts. The group appears publicly in white masks and sunglasses, similar to the Patriot Front, and has adopted a modified version of the coat of arms of Canada as their logo.

== History ==
The group was founded by Jeremy MacKenzie, a military veteran and prominent far-right activist who also founded Diagolon, an alt-right organization. While not appearing publicly in its first year of operation, the Second Sons used gyms across Canada to bolster their presence and increase recruitment. On October 30, 2025, the Canadian Anti-Hate Network reported that over 2,000 people have signed up for the Second Sons in the past month.

In March 2026, a report from Public Safety Canada described the Second Sons as "a similar far-right group" to the Canadian active clubs and reported that the Second Sons has over 15 chapters nationwide.

Shield of the Coat of arms of Canada, that the Second Sons logo is based on

=== Activities ===
==== 2025 ====
The group was first spotted publicly in March 2025 by the Canadian Anti-Hate Network at a soldier's cenotaph in Dartmouth, Nova Scotia.

The Second Sons held their first public rally on August 30, at Brock's Monument in Queenston Heights Park, with over 50 people attending. The rally was condemned by Niagara-on-the-Lake mayor Gary Zalepa and Niagara Falls MPP Wayne Gates, both stating that "hate has no place in Canada".

On September 10, members of the Second Sons protested outside of the St. Catharines courthouse before moving to protest outside of the Niagara Detention Centre in Thorold. The protest was due to sex offender and pedophile Daniel Senecal getting a lenient sentence for his crimes.

In October, the Second Sons held two simultaneous protests outside of CBC News offices in Ottawa and Regina. In both protests, members of the Second Sons held signs which read: "CBC Hates White People."

On November 23, roughly 30 members of the Second Sons stood on an overpass in London, Ontario. They held a Canadian Royal Flag and the flag of the Second Sons as well as a banner that read "REMIGRATION NOW". The London Police Service reported that they were aware of the protest. Afterwards, the group walked in formation through Thames Park. The protest was condemned by deputy London Police Chief Paul Bastien and city councillor Skylar Franke.

==== 2026 ====
On January 17, 2026, around 40 members of the Second Sons stood on an overpass over Highway 11 in Orillia while other members of the group stood on an overpass in Regina. Some members held a banner which read: "Indian trucks kill Canucks". No arrests were reported at the demonstration.

During the spring, members of the organization travelled to the United States to train with American white nationalist groups.

On May 31, over a dozen members of the Second Sons staged a rally in Shawinigan, Quebec, where they held a banner which read: "Je me souviens d'un Quebec Blanc" (English: "I remember a White Quebec"). The rally was condemned by Quebec Premier Christine Fréchette, Parti Québécois leader Paul St-Pierre Plamondon, Canadian Federal Finance Minister François-Philippe Champagne, Bloc Québécois leader Yves-François Blanchet, Quebec Liberal Party leader Charles Milliard, and Québec Solidaire co-spokesman Sol Zanetti.

In June, a small group of members raised a white cross with the Second Sons logo at an opioid epidemic memorial in Greater Sudbury, Ontario, blaming the opioid epidemic on foreigners. Municipal authorities took down the cross and covered up the graffiti.

In July, Second Sons held its second annual national meeting in a community hall south of Calgary, unknown to the local community. CBC News published an online report on August 6 which identified the location as Square Butte Community Hall, located just southwest of Calgary near the Albertan hamlet of Millarville.

On September 27, around 30 members of the Second Sons gathered on the Tk'emlúps te Secwépemc reserve in southern British Columbia. Despite being told to leave by the reserve's security personnel, they remained until the arrival of the RCMP.
