= Alt-right =

Far-right white nationalist movement

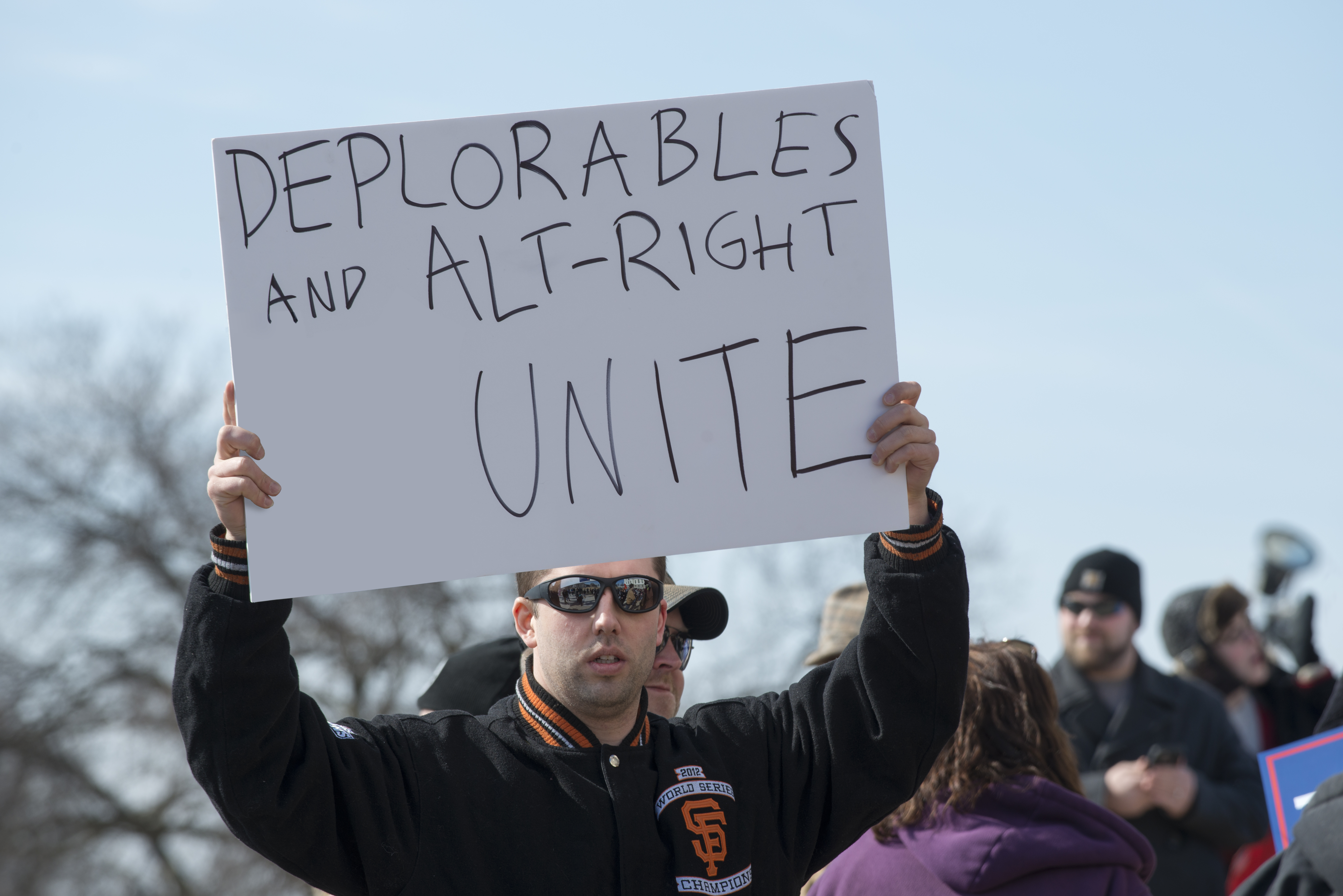
An alt-right supporter at the 2017 March 4 Trump rally in Saint Paul, Minnesota, holding a sign that says, "Deplorables and alt right unite". A depiction of Pepe the Frog has been digitally removed from the lower left corner of the man's sign due to copyright issues. (Note: Pepe the Frog is an Internet meme which has been appropriated by the alt-right as a symbol of the movement.)

The alt-right (abbreviated from alternative right) is a far-right and white nationalist movement. A largely online phenomenon, the alt-right originated in the United States during the late 2000s before increasing in popularity and establishing a presence in other countries during the mid-2010s. The term is ill-defined and has been used in different ways by academics, journalists, media commentators, and alt-right members themselves.

In 2010, the American white nationalist Richard B. Spencer launched The Alternative Right webzine. His "alternative right" was influenced by earlier forms of American white nationalism, as well as paleoconservatism, the Dark Enlightenment, and the Nouvelle Droite. His term was shortened to "alt-right" and popularized by far-right participants of /pol/, the politics board of the web forum 4chan. It came to be associated with other white nationalist websites and groups, including Andrew Anglin's Daily Stormer, Brad Griffin's Occidental Dissent, and Matthew Heimbach's Traditionalist Worker Party. Following the 2014 Gamergate controversy, the alt-right made increasing use of trolling and online harassment to raise its profile. It attracted broader attention in 2015, particularly through coverage on Steve Bannon's Breitbart News, due to alt-right support for Donald Trump's presidential campaign. Upon being elected, Trump disavowed the movement. Attempting to transform itself from an online-based movement to a physical one, Spencer and other alt-right figures organized the August 2017 Unite the Right rally in Charlottesville, Virginia, which led to violent clashes with counter-demonstrators and resulted in one death when an alt-right member drove his car through the crowd of counter-demonstrators. The fallout from the rally resulted in a decline of the alt-right as a distinct movement within the wider Western far-right.

The alt-right movement espouses the pseudoscientific idea of biological racism and promotes a form of identity politics in favor of European Americans and white people internationally. Anti-egalitarian in nature, it rejects the liberal democratic basis of U.S. governance, and opposes both the conservative and liberal wings of the country's political mainstream. Many of its members seek to replace the U.S. with a white separatist ethnostate. Some alt-rightists seek to make white nationalism socially respectable, while others (known as the "1488" scene) adopt openly white supremacist and neo-Nazi stances to shock and provoke. Some alt-rightists are antisemitic, promoting a conspiracy theory that there is a Jewish plot to bring about white genocide, although other alt-rightists view most Jews as members of the white race. The alt-right is anti-feminist and intersects with the online manosphere. Most adherents to the alt-right are also Islamophobic. The movement distinguished itself from earlier forms of white nationalism through its largely online presence and its heavy use of irony and humor, particularly through the promotion of memes like Pepe the Frog. Individuals who are aligned with many of the alt-right's ideas without espousing its white nationalism have been termed "alt-lite".

The alt-right's membership is overwhelmingly white and male, attracted to the movement by deteriorating living standards and prospects, anxieties about the social role of white masculinity, and anger at left-wing and non-white forms of identity politics such as feminism and Black Lives Matter. Alt-right material has contributed to the radicalization of men responsible for various murders and terrorist attacks in the U.S. since 2014. Critics charge that the term "alt-right" is merely a rebranding of white supremacism.

== Definitions and terminology ==
The term "alt-right" is an abbreviation of "alternative right". A distinct far-right movement arising in the 2010s, it drew on older far-right ideas while also displaying novelties. Efforts to define the alt-right have been complicated by the contradictory ways in which self-described "alt-rightists" have defined the movement, and by the tendency among some of its political opponents to apply the term "alt-right" liberally to a broad range of right-wing groups and viewpoints.

As the alt-right rose to wider awareness around 2016, media sources struggled to understand it; some commentators applied the term as a catch-all for anyone they deemed far-right. The scholars Patrik Hermansson, David Lawrence, Joe Mulhall, and Simon Murdoch noted that in the "press and broadcast media", the term had been "used to describe everything from hardcore Nazis and Holocaust deniers, through to mainstream Republicans in the US, and right-wing populists in Europe". As the term "alt-right" was devised by a group of white nationalists themselves, as a form of self-description, some journalists avoided it. George Hawley, a political scientist specializing in the U.S. far-right, disagreed with this approach, noting that using terms like "white supremacist" in place of "alt-right" conceals the way that the alt-right differed from other far-right movements.

=== Definitions ===
The 'alt-right' or 'alternative right' is a name currently embraced by some white supremacists and white nationalists to refer to themselves and their ideology, which emphasizes preserving and protecting the white race in the United States in addition to, or over, other traditional conservative positions such as limited government, low taxes and strict law-and-order. The movement has been described as a mix of racism, white nationalism and populism ... criticizes 'multiculturalism' and more rights for non-whites, women, Jews, Muslims, gays, immigrants and other minorities. Its members reject the American democratic ideal that all should have equality under the law regardless of creed, gender, ethnic origin or race.

— The Associated Press

Hermansson et al defined the alt-right as "a far right, anti-globalist grouping" that operated "primarily online though with offline outlets". They noted that its "core belief is that 'white identity' is under attack from pro-multicultural and liberal elites, and so-called 'social justice warriors' (SJWs), who allegedly use 'political correctness' to undermine Western civilisation and the rights of white males". The anti-fascist researcher Matthew N. Lyons defined the alt-right as "a loosely organized far-right movement that shares a contempt for both liberal multiculturalism and mainstream conservatism; a belief that some people are inherently superior to others; a strong Internet presence and embrace of specific elements of online culture; and a self-presentation as being new, hip, and irreverent".

The Encyclopædia Britannica defined the alt-right as "a loose association of relatively young white nationalists, extreme libertarians, and neo-Nazis" who were "mostly active online". The Southern Poverty Law Center defined the alt-right as "a set of far-right ideologies, groups and individuals whose core belief is that 'white identity' is under attack by multicultural forces using 'political correctness' and 'social justice' to undermine white people and 'their' civilization". The Anti-Defamation League states that "alt-right" is a "vague term actually encompass[ing] a range of people on the extreme right who reject mainstream conservatism in favor of forms of conservatism that embrace implicit or explicit racism or white supremacy".

In the Columbia Journalism Review, the journalist Chava Gourarie labelled it a "rag-tag coalition" operating as a "diffuse online subculture" that had "an inclination for vicious online trolling, with some roots in fringe-right ideologies". In The New York Times, journalists Aishvarya Kavi and Alan Feuer defined the alt-right as "a loosely affiliated collection of racists, misogynists and Islamophobes that rose to prominence around the time of Mr. Trump's first campaign." BBC journalist Mike Wendling termed it "an incredibly loose set of ideologies held together by what they oppose: feminism, Islam, the Black Lives Matter movement, political correctness, a fuzzy idea they call 'globalism,' and establishment politics of both the left and the right".

== History ==
=== Influences ===
The alt-right had various ideological forebears. The idea of white supremacy had been dominant across U.S. political discourse throughout the 19th and early 20th centuries. After World War II, it was increasingly repudiated and relegated to the far-right of the country's political spectrum. Far-right groups retaining such ideas—such as George Lincoln Rockwell's American Nazi Party and William Luther Pierce's National Alliance—remained marginal. By the 1990s, white supremacism was largely confined to neo-Nazi and Ku Klux Klan (KKK) groups, although its ideologues wanted to return it to the mainstream. That decade, several white supremacists reformulated their ideas as white nationalism, through which they presented themselves not as seeking to dominate non-white racial groups but rather as lobbying for the interests of European Americans in a similar way to how civil rights groups lobbied for the rights of African Americans and Hispanic Americans. Although white nationalists often distanced themselves from white supremacism, white supremacist sentiment remained prevalent in white nationalist writings.

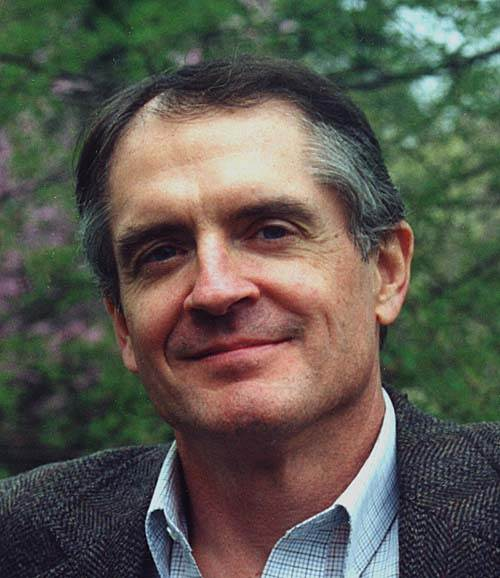
The American white nationalist ideologue Jared Taylor became a revered figure among the alt-right; events organized by his American Renaissance group were attended by many alt-right members.

American white nationalists believed that the United States had been created as a nation explicitly for white people of European descent and that it should remain that way. Many called for the formation of an explicitly white ethnostate. Seeking to distance themselves from the violent, skinhead image of neo-Nazi and KKK groups, several white nationalist ideologues—namely Jared Taylor, Peter Brimelow, and Kevin B. MacDonald—sought to cultivate an image of respectability and intellectualism through which to promote their views. Hawley later termed their ideology "highbrow white nationalism", and noted its particular influence on the alt-right. Taylor, for instance, became a revered figure in alt-right circles.

Under the Republican presidency of George W. Bush in the 2000s, the white nationalist movement focused largely on criticizing conservatives rather than liberals, accusing them of betraying white Americans. In that period, they drew increasingly on the conspiracy theories that had been generated by the Patriot movement since the 1990s; online, the white nationalist and Patriot movements increasingly converged. Following the election of Democratic Party candidate Barack Obama to the presidency in 2008—making him the first black president of the country—the world-views of various right-wing movements, including white supremacists, Patriots, and Tea Partiers, increasingly began to coalesce, in part due to a shared racial animus against Obama.

According to Tait, during the rise of the Tea Party movement and Mitt Romney's 2012 presidential campaign, there were "cultural and economic shifts that created the conditions for a parallel shift in right-wing politics.", including changing demographics, the rise of the Internet and social media giving a significant platform to more extreme right-wing voices that were previously marginalized by "responsible conservative gatekeepers", the perceived failure of the war on terror led by neoconservatives, the Obergefell v. Hodges Supreme Court decision that legalized same-sex marriage and undermined social conservatism, the 2008 Great Recession that undermined conservatives' support of the free market, and men with certain beliefs about gender roles "feeling traditionally male spaces were being eroded." and facing competition in the economy from "highly educated women". All of these factors also lead to "the collapse of intellectual and political guardrails on the right.

The alt-right drew upon several older currents of right-wing thought. One was the Nouvelle Droite, a far-right movement that originated in 1960s France before spreading elsewhere in Europe. Many alt-rightists adopted the Nouvelle Droite's views on pursuing long-term cultural change through "metapolitical" strategies; it thereby shares similarities with European identitarianism, which also draws upon the Nouvelle Droite. The alt-right also exhibited similarities with the paleoconservative movement which emerged in the U.S. during the 1980s. Both opposed neoconservatism and expressed similar positions on restricting immigration and supporting an openly nationalistic foreign policy; however, unlike the alt-right, the paleoconservatives were typically closely aligned to Christianity and wanted to reform the conservative movement rather than destroy it. Certain paleoconservatives, such as Samuel T. Francis, became especially close to white nationalism.

There were also links between the American right-libertarian movement and the alt-right, despite libertarianism's general condemnation of identity politics and collectivism. Many senior alt-rightists previously considered themselves libertarians, and right-libertarian theorist Murray Rothbard has been cited as a particular link between the two movements due to his staunch anti-egalitarianism and support for ideas about differing IQ levels among racial groups. Also cited in connection with the alt-right was the Dark Enlightenment, or neo-reactionary movement, which emerged online in the 2000s, pursuing an anti-egalitarian message. This movement intersected with the alt-right; many individuals identified with both movements. The Dark Enlightenment however was not white nationalist, deeming the latter insufficiently elitist.

According to Dean, in the 1990s, there were "alt-right" Usenet groups that consisted of fringe libertarians, anarcho-capitalists, and fans of American writer and philosopher Ayn Rand, who advocated for the abolition of the state in favor of private property and markets. According to Winter, during the 1990s and early 2000s, "the American far-right did not harness the Internet quickly, effectively or widely. More recently, however, they have experienced a resurgence and mainstreaming, benefitting greatly from social media."

=== 2008–2014: Origins ===
According to Hawley, the alt-right began in 2008. In November of that year, the paleoconservative ideologue and academic Paul Gottfried gave a talk at his H. L. Mencken Club in Baltimore. Although the talk was titled "The Decline and Rise of the Alternative Right", it did not contain the phrase "alternative right" itself. Gottfried observed that, as the paleoconservative movement declined, a new cohort of young right-wingers were rising to take its place in challenging the neoconservative ideology then dominant in the Republican Party and broader U.S. conservative movement.

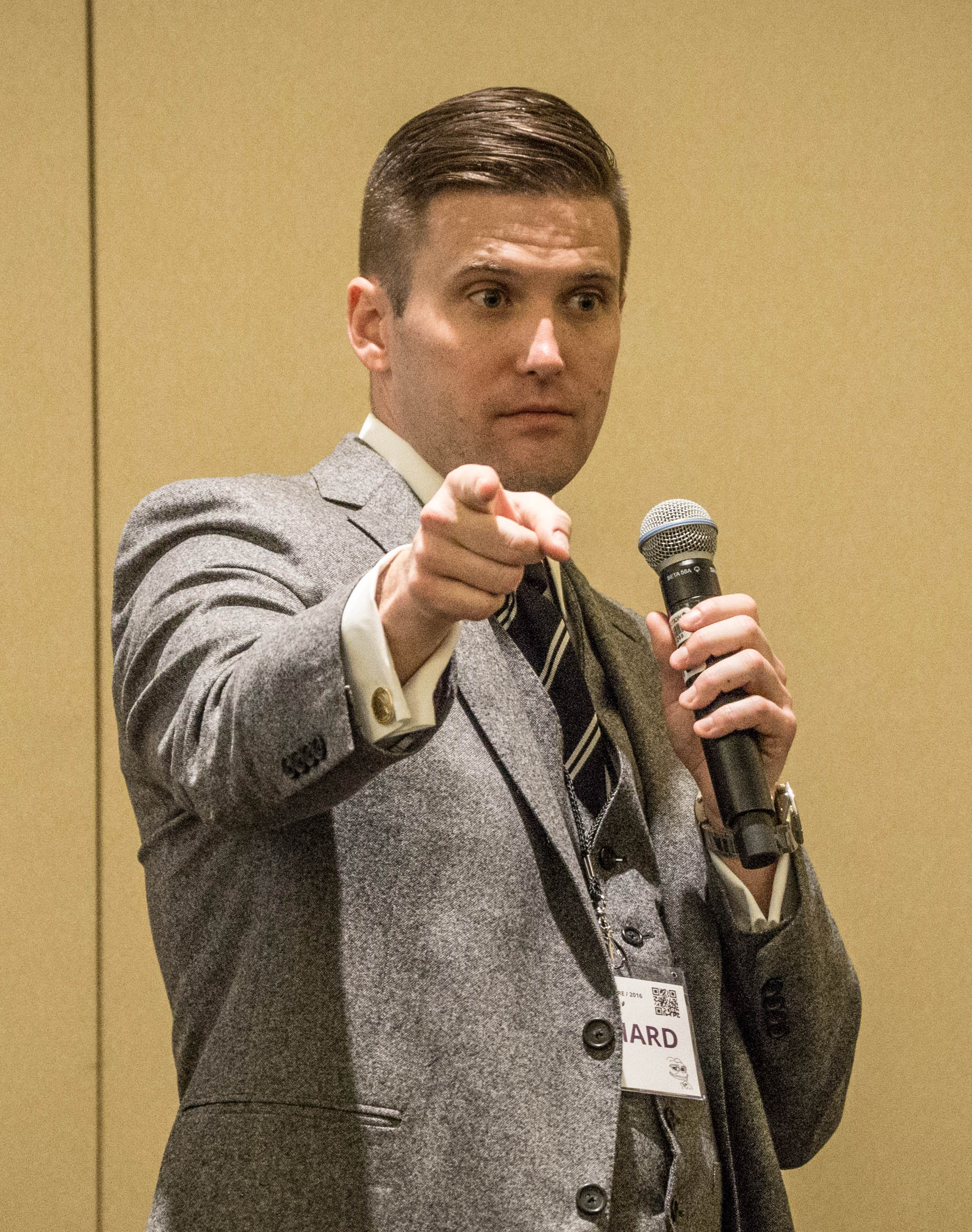
Richard B. Spencer claimed to have coined the term "alternative right" in 2008.

One of those endorsing Gottfried's idea was fellow paleoconservative Richard B. Spencer. Born in 1978 to a wealthy family and raised in Dallas, Texas, in 2007, Spencer had dropped out of his PhD programme at Duke University to take up a position at The American Conservative magazine. Spencer claimed he coined the term "alternative right" for the lecture's title, although Gottfried maintained that they were its joint creators. As "alternative right" became associated increasingly with white nationalism in subsequent years, Gottfried distanced himself from it.

After The American Conservative fired Spencer, in 2008 he became managing director of Taki Theodoracopulos's right-wing website Taki's Magazine. The website initially contained contributions largely from paleoconservatives and right-libertarians, but under Spencer also gave space to white nationalists like Taylor. In 2009, Spencer used the term "alternative right" in the title of an article by white nationalist Kevin DeAnna. By 2010, Spencer had moved fully from paleoconservatism to white nationalism, although various later press sources instead called him a white supremacist. Leaving Taki's Magazine, in March 2010, Spencer launched The Alternative Right webzine. Early issues featured articles by white nationalists like Taylor and MacDonald as well as the Heathen Stephen McNallen. Spencer noted that "if you look at the initial articles for AlternativeRight.com, that was the first stage of the Alt-Right really coming into its own".

AlternativeRight.com consisted primarily of short essays, covering a range of political and cultural issues. Many of these reflected the influence of the French Nouvelle Droite, although this declined as the alt-right grew. Spencer later stated that he wanted to create a movement distinct from the white power image of neo-Nazi and KKK groups, noting that their approach to white nationalism was "a total nonstarter. No one outside a hardcore coterie would identify with it". In 2011, Spencer became the head of the white nationalist National Policy Institute and launched the Radix Journal to promote his views; in 2012, he stepped down from the AlternativeRight website and took it offline in December 2013. By that year, Spencer was expressing ambivalence about the "alternative right" label; he preferred to be called an "identitarian".

=== 2014–2017: Rise and peak in popularity ===
==== Mainstream emergence ====
On the Internet, Spencer's term "alternative right" was adopted and abbreviated to "alt-right". According to writer Osita Nwanevu, the abbreviation "retains the former phrase's associations—the mix of alienation and optimism embedded in the act of proudly affirming an 'alternative' direction—but compacts them into a snappier package". The "alt-right" tag was created with public relations in mind, allowing white nationalists to soften their image and helping to draw in recruits from conservatism. Many white nationalists gravitated to the term to escape the negative connotations of the term "white nationalism". Spencer thought that by this point, the "Alt-Right" had become "the banner of white identity politics".

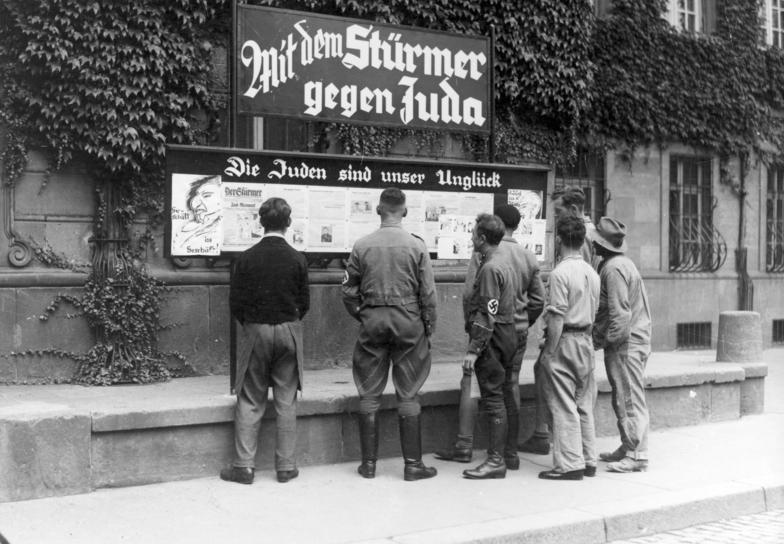
The Daily Stormer is named for the Nazi tabloid Der Stürmer, known for its antisemitic caricatures. This 1934 billboard for Der Stürmer reads "With Der Stürmer against Judea. The Jews are our misfortune".

The term gained wider usage on websites like 4chan and Reddit, growing in popularity in 2015. Although there had previously been a strong left-libertarian contingent to these online spaces, there was a gradual rightward turn in chan culture centred on 4chan's politics board, /pol/, during the early-mid 2010s, with the fundamentalist approach to free speech contributing. According to Hawley, the alt-right was "an outgrowth of Internet troll culture", with Hermansson et al observing that "Online Antagonistic Communities" were key to the formation of the alt-right as a distinct movement.

The alt-right's emergence was marked by the online gamergate controversy of 2014, in which some gamers harassed those promoting feminism within the gaming scene and voiced opposition towards progressivism in the video game industry. According to the journalist David Neiwert, Gamergate "heralded the rise of the alt-right and provided an early sketch of its primary features: an Internet presence beset by digital trolls, unbridled conspiracism, angry-white-male-identity victimization culture, and, ultimately, open racism, antisemitism, ethnic hatred, misogyny, and sexual and gender paranoia". Gamergate politicized many young people, especially males, in opposition to the perceived culture war being waged by leftists. Through their shared opposition to political correctness, feminism, and multiculturalism, chan culture built a link to the alt-right. By 2015, the alt-right had gained significant momentum as an online movement, attracting support on social media and internet forums.

Notable promoters of the alt-right included Spencer, Vox Day, and Brittany Pettibone. Earlier white nationalist thinkers were also characterized as alt-right thinkers, among them Taylor, and MacDonald. Other prominent alt-rightists included Brad Griffin, a member of the neo-Confederate League of the South who founded the Occidental Dissent blog, Matthew Heimbach, who established the Traditionalist Youth Network in 2013, and Andrew Anglin, who launched the Daily Stormer website—named after the Der Stürmer newspaper active in Nazi Germany—in 2013. By 2016, Anglin called the Daily Stormer "the world's most visited alt-right website". While some of the websites associated with the alt-right—like The Daily Stormer and the Traditionalist Youth Network—adopted neo-Nazi approaches, others, such as Occidental Dissent, The Unz Review, Vox Popoli, and Chateau Heartiste, adopted a less extreme form of white nationalism.

==== Breitbart News and the alt-lite ====
Far more widely visited than these alt-right websites was Breitbart News, which between 2016 and 2018 received over 10 million unique visitors a month. Launched by the conservative Andrew Breitbart in 2005, it came under the control of Steve Bannon in 2012. A right-wing nationalist and populist, Bannon was hostile to mainstream conservatism. Although much of Breitbart's coverage fed into racially charged narratives, it did not promote white nationalism, differing from the mainstream conservative press more in tone than in content. Alt-rightists termed Breitbart "alt-lite"; this term appeared in the alt-right's language in mid-2016, used pejoratively for rightists who shared their contempt for mainstream conservatism but not their white nationalism.

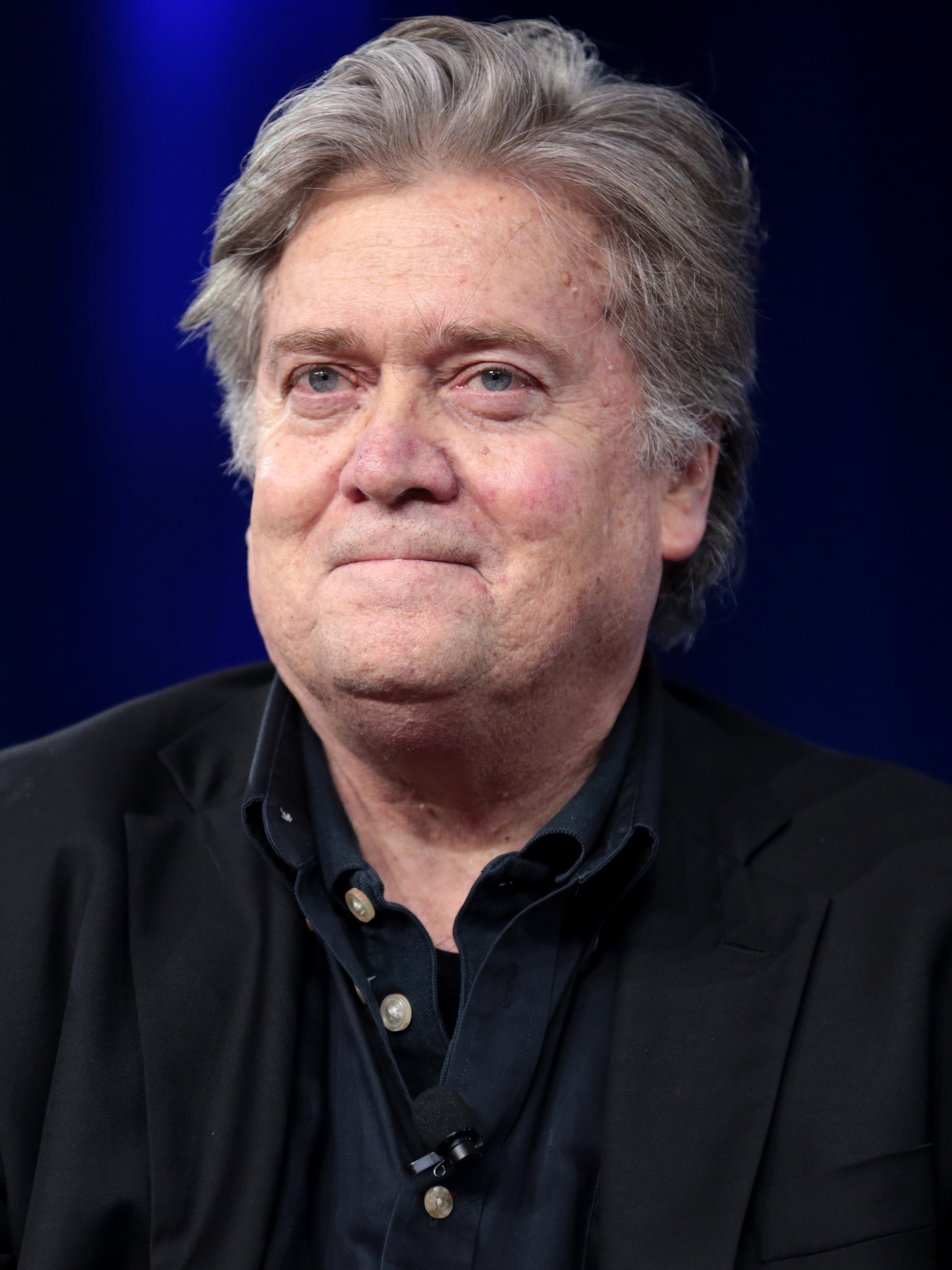
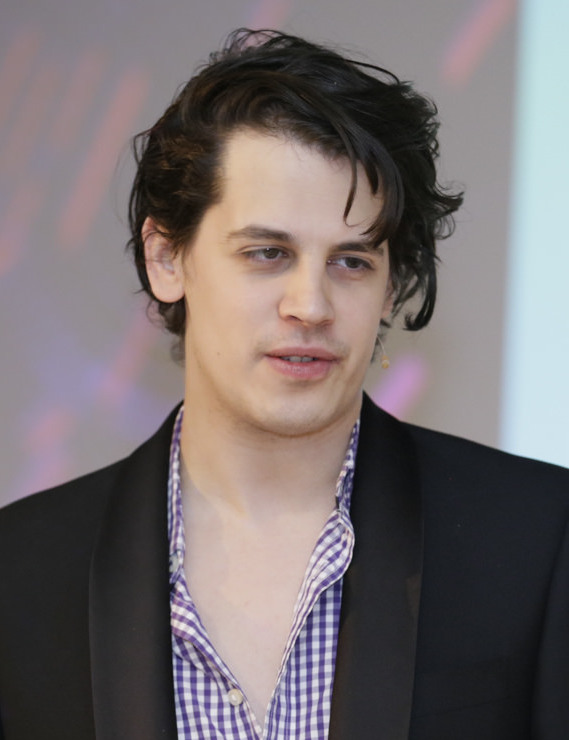
Breitbart News amplified and popularised alt-right ideas under the editorship of "alt-lite" figure Steve Bannon (left); its articles by Milo Yiannopoulos (right) were particularly influential.

In July 2016, Bannon claimed that Breitbart had become "the platform for the alt-right"; he may have been referring not to the website's official content but to its comments section—which is lightly moderated and contains more extreme views than those of Breitbart itself. Several political scientists rejected the characterization of Breitbart as alt-right, although press sources repeatedly described it as such, and the journalist Mike Wendling termed Breitbart "the chief popular media amplifier of alt-right ideas".

In March 2016, the writers Allum Bokhari and Milo Yiannopoulos published an article in Breitbart discussing the alt-right. They downplayed its most extreme elements and championed its counter-cultural value. Bokhari and Yiannopoulos' piece was subsequently widely cited in the mainstream press, with Hawley describing it as "the most sympathetic portrayal of the movement to appear in a major media venue to date". Many alt-rightists responded negatively to Bokhari and Yiannopoulos' article; The Daily Stormer referred to it as "the Product of a Degenerate Homosexual and an Ethnic Mongrel".

Many press sources subsequently termed Yiannopoulos "alt-right". This was rejected both by Hawley, and by alt-rightists; on Occidental Dissent, Griffin asked: "What the hell does Milo Yiannopoulos—a Jewish homosexual who boasts about carrying on interracial relationships with black men—have to do with us?" Other observers instead labeled Yiannopoulos "alt-light" or "alt-lite", a term also applied to rightists like Mike Cernovich and Gavin McInnes. McInnes clarified his understanding of the difference between the alt-right and alt-lite by explaining that while the former focused on the white race, the latter welcomed individuals of any racial background who shared its belief in the superiority of Western culture.

==== Donald Trump 2016 presidential campaign and election ====
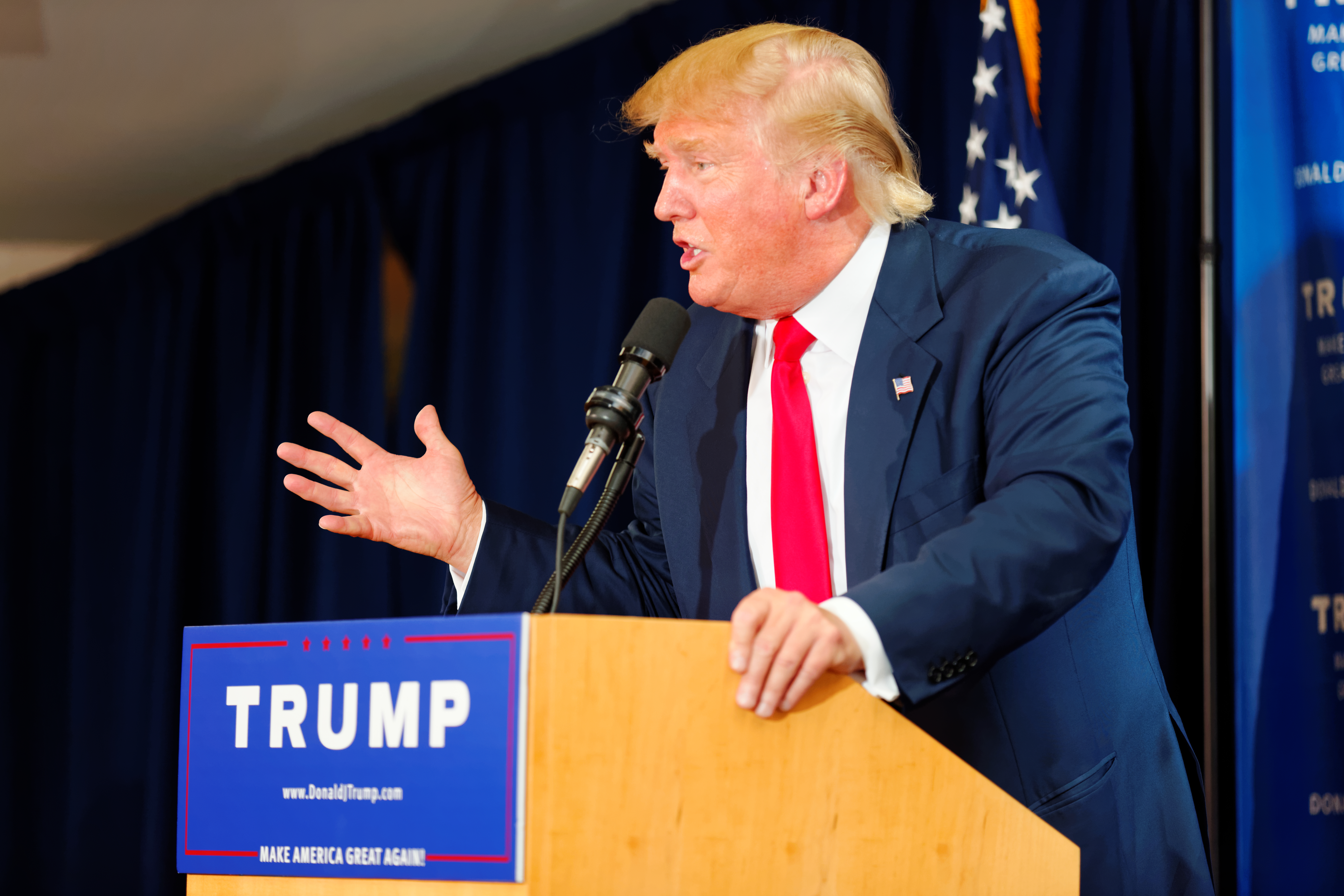
The alt-right largely rallied behind the presidential candidacy of Donald Trump, although he distanced himself from the movement.

In June 2015, billionaire businessman Donald Trump announced plans to campaign to become the Republican nominee for the 2016 presidential election, attracting the interest of alt-rightists as well as from white nationalists more broadly, neo-Nazis, KKK groups, and the Patriot movement. Vocal in their support for Trump's campaign, this cause energized the alt-right and gave them the opportunity for a broader audience. Neiwert observed that "Trump was the gateway drug for the alt-right", with many individuals learning of the movement through their interest in Trump.

Ideologically, the alt-right remained "far to Trump's right", and Trump himself had little understanding of the movement. Tait argued that the mainstream media largely "overstate[d] the connection" between Trump and the alt-right. Many alt-rightists recognized that Trump did not share their white nationalism and would not bring about all the changes they desired; they nevertheless approved of his hard attitude to immigration, his calls for a ban on Muslims entering the U.S., and for a wall to be built along the border with Mexico to curtail illegal immigration. They were grateful that he had shifted the national conversation rightward, and that he had shown that it was possible to challenge the mainstream conservative movement from the right. Griffin called on alt-rightists to "join the Trump campaign... to take down the hated cuckservative establishment". (Note: The term "cuckservative" is a portmanteau of "cuckold" and "conservative".) A small minority of alt-rightists were against supporting Trump; The Right Stuff contributor "Auschwitz Soccer Ref" complained that two of Trump's children had married Jews.

A keen Twitter user, in November 2015, Trump retweeted a graphic about African-American crime statistics which included the white nationalist hashtag "#WhiteGenocide". The alt-righter RamZPaul rejoiced, retweeting Trump's piece with the comment: "Trump watches and is influenced by the Alt Right". Over coming months, Trump retweeted a second tweet that had "#WhiteGenocide" as a hashtag as well as sharing other tweets issued by white supremacists. The alt-right saw this as further evidence that Trump was their champion.

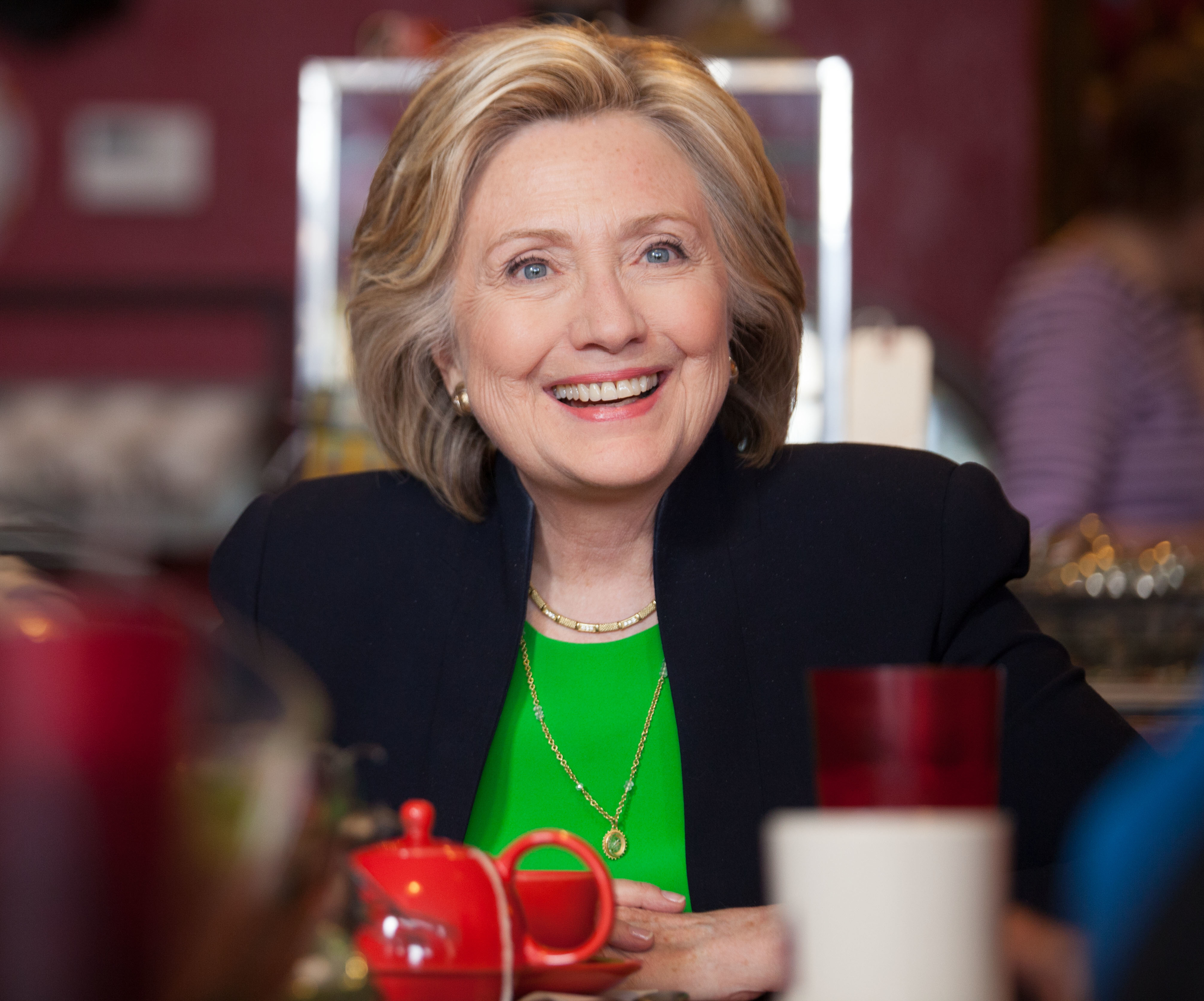
Hillary Clinton's August 2016 speech denouncing the alt-right helped bring the movement to mainstream attention.

In August 2016, Trump appointed Bannon to lead his election campaign. This was swiftly condemned in a Reno, Nevada speech given by the Democratic Party's nominee for the presidency, Hillary Clinton. She highlighted Bannon's claim that Breitbart was "the platform for the alt-right", describing the movement as "an emerging racist ideology" and warning that "a fringe element has effectively taken over the Republican Party". Attacking the alt-right as "racist ideas[...] anti-Muslim, anti-immigrant, anti-women ideas", she accused Trump of taking them "mainstream". Clinton said that while half of Trump's supporters were decent individuals "desperate for change", the other half represented a "basket of deplorables".

After Clinton's speech, traffic to alt-right websites rose and the mainstream media gave it increasing coverage; Spencer and other alt-rightists were pleased, believing her speech gave them greater publicity and helped legitimize them in the public eye. Many Trump supporters adopted the moniker of "deplorables", and the term was widely used on memes that the alt-right promoted online. In September, Spencer, Taylor, and Peter Brimelow held a press conference in Washington DC to explain their goals.

When Trump won the election in November, the alt-right's response was generally triumphalist and self-congratulatory. Anglin stated: "Make no mistake about it: we did this. If it were not for us, it wouldn't have been possible"; Spencer tweeted that "The Alt-Right has been declared the winner... We're the establishment now". Alt-rightists were generally supportive of Trump's decision to appoint Bannon his chief strategist, and Jeff Sessions his attorney general. While aware that Trump would not pursue a white nationalist agenda, the alt-right hoped to pull him further to the right, taking hardline positions that made him look more moderate, and thus shifting mainstream discourse rightward.

==== After Trump's election ====
Wendling suggested that Trump's election signaled "the beginning of the end" for the alt-right, with the movement's growth stalling from that point. Celebrating Trump's victory, Spencer held a November meeting in Washington D.C. in which he stated that he thought that he had "a psychic connection, a deeper connection with Donald Trump, in a way we simply do not have with most Republicans". He ended the conference by declaring "Hail Trump! Hail our people! Hail victory!", to which various attendees responded with Nazi salutes and chanting. This attracted significant press attention. When questioned on the incident, Spencer stated that the salutes were given "in a spirit of irony and exuberance".

Later that month, Trump was asked about the alt-right in an interview with The New York Times. He responded: "I don't want to energize the group, and I disavow the group". This rejection angered many alt-rightists. In April 2017, many alt-rightists criticized Trump's order to launch the Shayrat missile strike against Syrian military targets; like many of those who had supported him, they believed he was going back on his promise of a more non-interventionist foreign policy in the Middle East.

Hawley noted that the alt-right's influence on the Trump administration was "negligible". However, press sources alleged that several appointments within the Trump administration were linked to the alt-right, including Senior Advisor to the President Stephen Miller, National Security Advisor Michael Flynn, Deputy Assistant to the President Sebastian Gorka, Special Assistant to the President Julia Hahn, and speechwriter Darren Beattie. After Trump's election, the alt-right also supported the unsuccessful campaigns of several other Republicans, including Roy Moore. Some Republican candidates who were alleged to have alt-right links also ran for office, among them Paul Nehlen, Corey Stewart, Josh Mandel, and Joe Arpaio.

In 2016, Twitter began closing alt-right accounts it regarded as engaging in abuse or harassment; among those closed were the accounts of Spencer and his NPI. In February 2017, Reddit then closed down the "r/altright" subreddit after its participants were found to have breached its policy prohibiting doxing. Facebook followed by shutting down Spencer's pages on its platform in April 2018. In January 2017, Spencer launched a new website, Altright.com, which combined the efforts of the Arktos publishing company and the Red Ice video and radio network.

==== Unite the Right rally and its aftermath ====
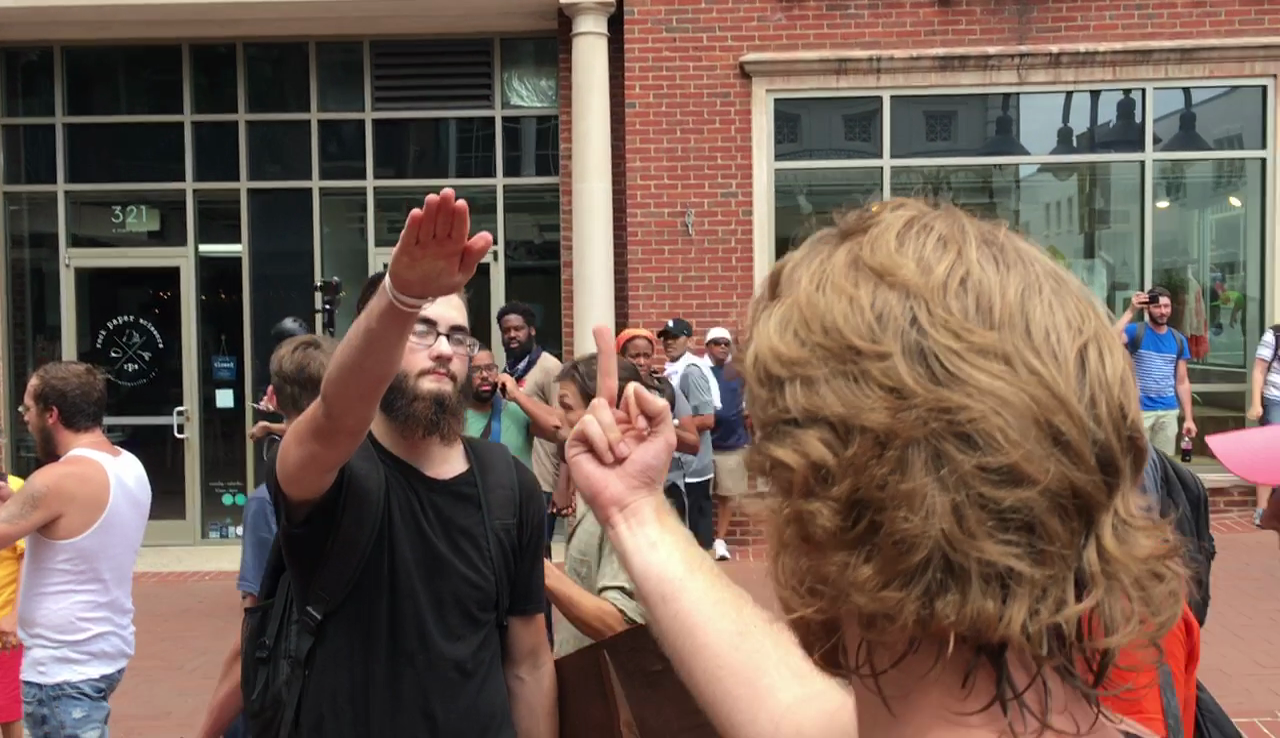

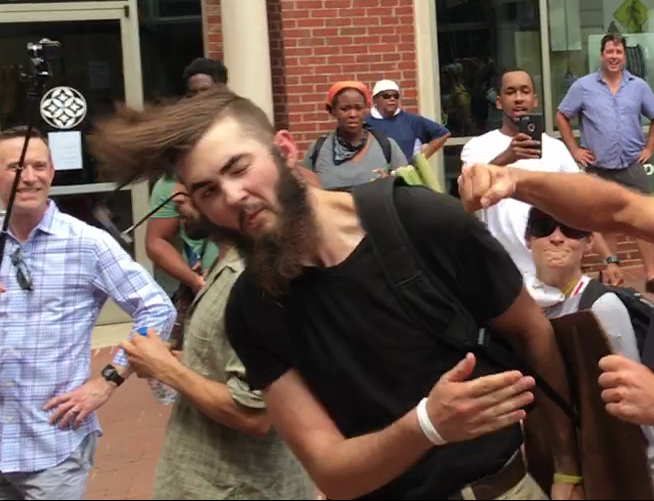
A participant at the Unite the Right rally gave a Nazi salute and was subsequently assaulted by counter-protesters.

In August 2017, the Unite the Right rally took place in Charlottesville, Virginia, bringing together alt-rightists with members of other far-right movements. Many alt-rightists thought that the rally would mark a turning point in the transformation of their movement from an online phenomenon into a street-based one. At altright.com, editor Vincent Law for instance predicted before the event took place that "People will talk about Charlottesville as a turning point". However, the event and its aftermath proved demoralizing for many in the movement.

Various violent acts took place at the rally. An African-American man, DeAndre Harris, was assaulted by demonstrators, while Richard W. Preston, an Imperial Wizard for the Maryland-based Confederate White Knights of the Ku Klux Klan, fired a gun towards counter-protesters. One participant in the rally, a 20-year-old from Ohio named James Alex Fields Jr., rammed his car into counter-protesters, killing 32-year old Heather D. Heyer and injuring 35 others. Although Spencer condemned the killing, other alt-rightists celebrated it. Fields was arrested and later sentenced to life in prison. The car ramming incident brought much negative publicity to the event and its participants, earning the alt-right a reputation for violence.

Video of the Charlottesville car attack which killed one person and injured 35

Various commentators and politicians, including Sessions, labelled Fields' ramming attack "domestic terrorism". Trump claimed that there were "some very fine people on both sides" of the Charlottesville protests, stating that what he called the "alt-left" bore some responsibility for the violence. Spencer stated that he was "really proud" of the president for those comments. Amid criticism of his comments, Trump added his view that "racism is evil" and that "those who cause violence in its name are criminals and thugs".

Various alt-rightists who attended the rally experienced personal and legal repercussions for their involvement; one attendee, the U.S. Marine Vasillios Pistolis, was for instance court-martialled. Internet service providers and social media websites subsequently terminated many alt-right accounts and sites. Prominent figures like Spencer became reticent about organizing further public protests. He experimented with the use of flash demonstrations, returning to Charlottesville with a much smaller group for an unannounced protest in October. Unite the Right exacerbated tensions between the alt-right and the alt-lite; Breitbart distanced itself from the alt-right, as did Yiannopoulos, who insisted he had "nothing in common" with Spencer.

=== 2017–2018: Decline ===
The alt-right significantly declined in 2017 and 2018. This happened for multiple reasons, including the backlash of the Unite the Right rally, the fracturing of the movement, more effective banishment of hate speech and harassment from major social media websites and widespread opposition by the American population. In 2018, Heidi Beirich of the Southern Poverty Law Center described it as "imploding", while Marilyn Mayo of the Anti-Defamation League stated that the alt-right was in "a downward spiral, but it doesn't mean they're going to disappear". That year, Heimbach was arrested for the battery of his wife and father-in-law, resulting in the dissolution of his Traditionalist Workers Party, while Anglin went into hiding to avoid a harassment lawsuit, and Spencer canceled his speaking tour. Writing for The Guardian, Jason Wilson stated that "the alt-right looks like it is crumbling". Tait stated that after the Unite the Right rally, "it was clear that the alt-right brand had been oversaturated, diluted, and damaged.", but added that the alt-right "managed to reintroduce racist and antisemitic discourse into the mainstream of the right via the overlapping circles of the hardcore alt-right, the alt-lite, and the nebulous world of online anti-progressivism. The story of the alt-right, then, is one of how the American right, or any modern ideological movement, can—and cannot—police itself without guardrails.

There has been widespread concern that as the chance of a large-scale political movement dies out, lone-wolf terrorist attacks from members will become common. In 2017, terrorist attacks and violence affiliated with the alt-right and white supremacy were the leading cause of extremist violence in the United States. Zack Beauchamp of Vox suggested that "other, more nakedly violent far-right movements have risen in its wake". Several alt-right candidates ran as Republican candidates in the 2018 elections. The neo-Nazi and Holocaust denier Arthur Jones ran for an Illinois congressional seat, the white supremacist Paul Nehlen for the Wisconsin seat of Paul Ryan, the Republican Speaker of the House, and the neo-Nazi Patrick Little for the United States Senate election in California, 2018.

According to Tait, "Leading figures associated with the alt-right have disappeared into obscurity, self-immolated, and reinvented themselves as centrists. Meanwhile, the ideology's ideas have diffused across the political landscape."

=== 2018–present: Resurgence ===
Groups like the terrorist group Atomwaffen Division grew after the Unite the Right rally, recruiting those radicalized by its events and aftermath. New groups were also former in the aftermath, like the Patriot Front and the National Socialist Legion, which both split from Vanguard America. The accelerationist tome Siege spread rapidly in the post-Unite the Right landscape as radicalized alt-right adherents pushed one another to commit violence, and "read Siege" was posted on /pol/ over 5,500 times between 2017 and 2022.

During October and November 2019, Turning Point USA's "Culture War" college tour was frequently targeted by a group known as "the Groyper army", led by Nick Fuentes, who consider some groups to be not sufficiently conservative on issues of race and ethnicity, immigration, and LGBTQ rights.

In 2020, several alt-right organizations were formed outside of the United States including the Australian National Socialist Network, and the Canadian Diagolon group. Diagolon would go on to participate in the Canada convoy protest in 2022.

In 2024, the Canadian alt-right organization Second Sons was founded by Canadian podcaster and military veteran Jeremy MacKenzie, the same person who founded Diagolon.

On 16 November 2024, 11 days after Trump had been re-elected as president, the alt-right neo-Nazi group Hate Club 1488 marched through Columbus, Ohio while multiple groups held roadside demonstration in Decatur, Alabama. American magazine Wired compiled all reported instances of similar neo-Nazi demonstrations and found that alt-right neo-Nazi rallies were on the rise with 4 demonstrations in 2021, 22 in 2022, 30 in 2023, and 34 in 2024.

Academic Laura K. Field, in her 2025 book titled The Making of the MAGA New Right, argued that the activities of alt-right movements have largely merged into the modern far-right and new right movement as of 2020–2021, as discussed in chapter six of her book, "From Alt-Right to Hard Right".

== Beliefs ==
The alt-right is situated on the far-right of the left-right political spectrum. It has no unifying manifesto and those who describe themselves as "alt-rightists" express varying views about what they want to achieve. There are nevertheless recurring attitudes within the movement. The alt-right's views are profoundly anti-egalitarian. It rejects many of the basic premises of the Age of Enlightenment and classical liberalism, including the liberal democracy which underpins the U.S. political system. For this reason, Hawley thought that "the Alt-Right seems like a poor fit for the United States, where both the left and right have roots in classical liberalism and the Enlightenment." Similarly, the academic Thomas J. Main stated that the alt-right sought "a root-and-branch rejection of American political principles".

The key division within the alt-right is between those who explicitly embrace neo-Nazi and white supremacist stances, and those white nationalists who present a more moderate image. Wendling suggested that this was "a distinction lacking a hugely significant difference". The white supremacist and neo-Nazi alt-rightists are sometimes termed "1488s", a combination of the white supremacist fourteen words slogan with 88, a coded reference to "HH", or "Heil Hitler". These neo-Nazi elements represent a minority within the alt-right. Many on the less extreme end of the movement are critical of them, believing that they "go too far" or generate bad publicity for it. Some of the latter mock the neo-Nazi and explicitly white supremacist elements as "Stormfags", a reference to the white supremacist website Stormfront.

According to Tait, the alt-right engages in a realm of politics that they call "metapolitics". Swedish alt-right publisher Daniel Friberg says that metapolitics aims to "ultimately ... redefine the conditions under which politics is conceived." Metapolitics also involves shifting the overton window, the range of ideas considered politically acceptable at a given time.

=== White nationalism ===
The alt-right is a white nationalist movement, and is fundamentally concerned with white identity. It views all political issues through the framework of race. Spencer described the alt-right as "identity politics for white Americans and for Europeans around the world", while the alt-rightist Greg Johnson of CounterCurrents Publishing stated that "The Alternative Right means White Nationalism". Not all alt-rightists actively embrace the term "white nationalist"; Spencer is among those who prefer to call themselves "identitarians". Main described the alt-right as promoting "white racialism", while Hawley commented that the alt-right is, "at its core, a racist movement". Similarly, historian David Atkinson stated that the alt-right was "a racist movement steeped in white supremacist ideas". Attitudes to non-white people vary within the alt-right, from those who desire tighter restrictions on non-white immigration into the U.S., to those who call for a violent ethnic cleansing of the country.

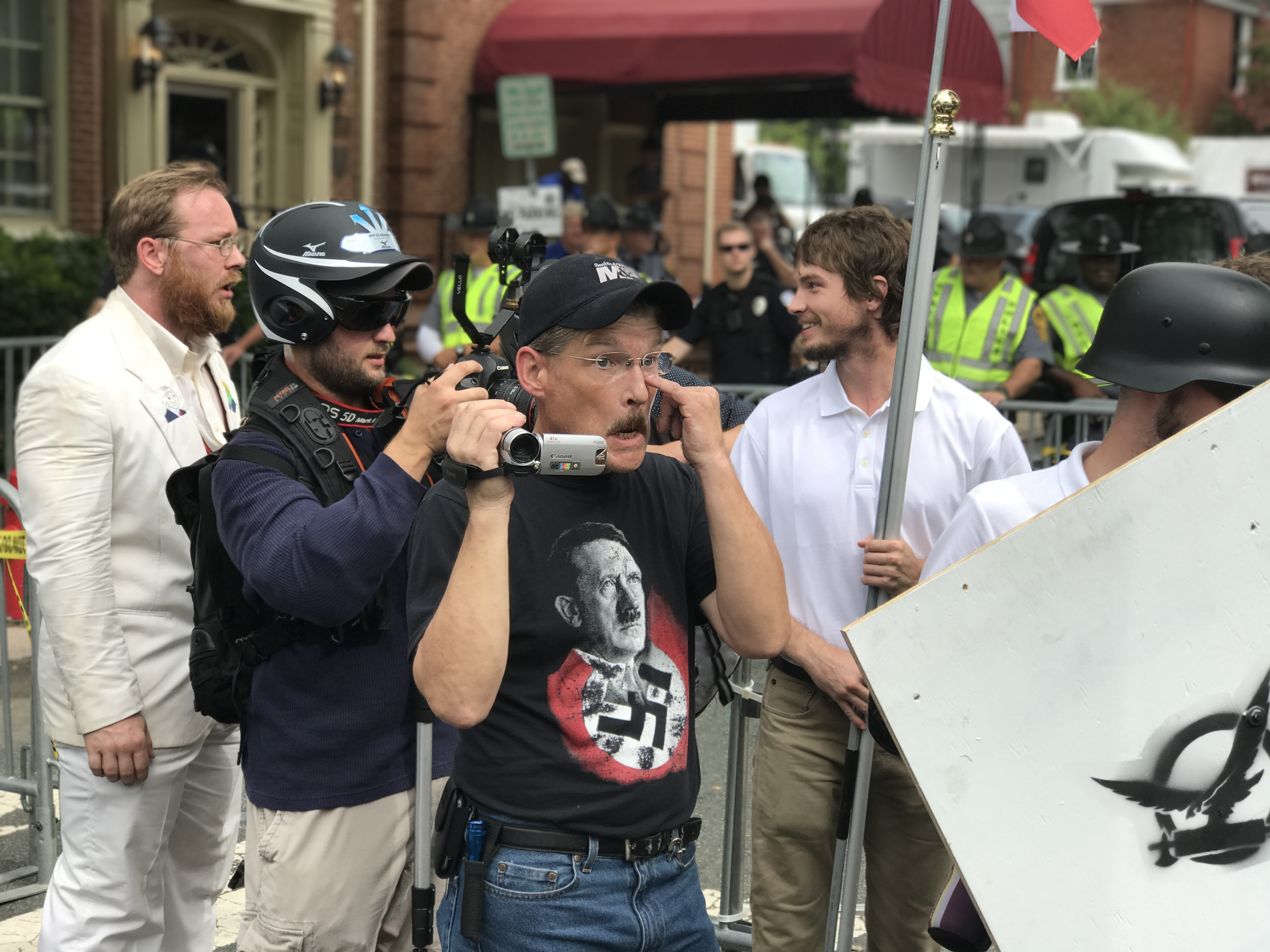
Protestors at the 2017 Unite the Right rally, which was promoted by the alt-right. One man carries the logo of Vanguard America, and another has a T-shirt depicting German Nazi leader Adolf Hitler.

Rejecting the idea that race is a socio-cultural construct, the alt-right promotes scientific racism, claiming that racial categories demarcate biologically distinct groups. They call this belief "race realism". A recurring tendency among alt-rightists is to rank these races on a hierarchy, according to perceived IQ. This hierarchy has Asians and Ashkenazi Jews at the top, followed by non-Jewish whites, then Arabs, and finally, black Africans. Several prominent alt-rightists, including Anglin and Spencer, have been romantically involved with women of Asian heritage. Unlike earlier racist worldviews, such as those of the interwar fascists, the alt-right emphasizes the idea of racial difference above that of racial superiority, leaving the latter either implicit, or secondary, in its discourse. Most alt-rightists reject the label of "white supremacist".

Having analyzed alt-right posts online, the political scientists Joe Phillips and Joseph Yi noted that a pervasive underlying theme was the belief that white people were victims, and that white Americans had been disadvantaged by government policies, such as affirmative action for non-white groups, assistance to illegal immigrants, and the perceived denigration of "white history", like Christopher Columbus and the Confederate States of America. Alt-right online discourse also expressed much anger at the idea of white privilege, widely promoted by the American Left in the 2010s, with members citing job insecurity, under employment or unemployment, and growing mortality rates among whites as evidence that they do not lead privileged lives.

Many alt-rightists have expressed the desire to push white nationalist ideas into the Overton window—the range of ideas tolerated in public discourse. The alt-right has served as a bridge between white nationalism and traditional conservatism, and as a tool used by white nationalists to push their rhetoric into the mainstream. On Twitter, alt-rightists, for instance, combined their white nationalist hashtags with others used by Trump supporters more broadly, notably #MakeAmericaGreatAgain, so as to spread their message across the broader political right.

==== White separatism and ethnostates ====
The alt-right is typically white separatist, with its members desiring autonomy in their own white communities. Some envision breaking up the United States into multiple states, each inhabited by a different ethnic or racial group, one or more of which would represent white ethnostates. Writing in the Pacific Standard, journalist Jared Keller commented that this desire for an independent ethnostate was similar to anarcho-fascist ideas promoted by the British National Anarchist Movement. Spencer compared his campaign for a white ethnostate with the early days of Zionism, which began in the 19th century with calls for the formation of a Jewish ethnostate, and resulted in the formation of Israel in the mid-20th century.

Many alt-rightists are unclear as to how a white ethnostate would emerge, but are content instead to promote the idea. Spencer commented "I don't know how we're going to get there, because the thing is, history will decide that for us... You have to wait for a revolutionary opportunity to present itself, and history will present that opportunity". He suggested that it could be achieved through "peaceful ethnic cleansing", with non-whites given financial incentives to leave. The prominent alt-rightist Greg Johnson suggested that it would come about after white nationalists became the dominant force in U.S. politics, at which point they would deport all illegal migrants, before encouraging all other people of color to emigrate.

Other alt-rightists are critical of the idea of breaking up the U.S. into ethnostates, arguing that this would mean destroying the country that their Euro-American ancestors built. They instead argue for restrictive immigration policies, to ensure that the U.S. retains its white majority. Some alt-rightists promote a pan-white empire spanning Europe and North America. Spencer noted that wanted his white ethnostate in North America to eventually form part of "a global empire" that could provide "a homeland for all white people", expanding its territory into the Middle East by conquering Istanbul, which in his words was "such a profoundly symbolic city. Retaking it, that would be a statement to the world".

==== Antisemitism and the white genocide conspiracy theory ====
Footage of right-wing protesters at the Unite the Right rally chanting "you will not replace us"

Some elements of the alt-right are antisemitic, but others are tolerant of Jews. Many in the alt-right believe that there is a Jewish conspiracy within the United States to achieve "white genocide", the elimination of white people as a racial group, and their replacement with non-whites. They believe that a Jewish cabal controls the U.S. government, media, and universities, and is pursuing its aim of white genocide by spreading anti-white tropes, and encouraging African-American civil rights groups. As evidence for this supposed white genocide, these far-right figures point to the depiction of inter-racial couples or mixed-race children on television, and the publication of articles discouraging women from having children early in life. They also cite apparent instances of white self-hatred, including Rachel Dolezal, an American woman of European descent who identifies as black.

This antisemitic conspiracy theory is not new to the alt-right, but has recurred among far-right groups in Western countries since the 19th century; it was the reason for the Holocaust and various antisemitic pogroms in European history. Andrew Anglin, one of the most prominent alt-right ideologues and a member of its neo-Nazi wing, stated "the core concept of the movement, upon which all else is based, is that Whites are undergoing an extermination, via mass immigration into White countries which was enabled by a corrosive liberal ideology of White self-hatred, and that the Jews are at the center of this agenda". Anglin stated that in the alt-right, "Many people also believe that the Jews should be exterminated". Other alt-rightists, like Spencer, welcome the involvement of Jews within their movement.

=== Opposition to neoconservatism and political correctness ===
The alt-right sought to hasten the downfall of U.S. conservatism, and conservatives were often the main target of alt-right wrath. The prominent alt-right ideologue Brad Griffin stated "Alt Right is presenting itself as a sleek new challenger to mainstream conservatism and libertarianism... Alt Right was designed to appeal to a younger audience who reject the Left, but who don't fit in on the stuffy or banal Right either". The alt-right places little emphasis on economic issues. Unlike mainstream U.S. conservatives, alt-rightists do not tend to favor laissez-faire economics, and most appear to support President Trump's protectionist economic measures.

The alt-right also rejects what it regards as the left-wing dominance of modern Western society. Phillips and Yi noted that alongside "white identity politics", the alt-right promotes "a message of expressive transgression against left-wing orthodoxy ('political correctness')". Political correctness has been characterized as one of the alt-right's "bugbears"; Nicole Hemmer stated on NPR that political correctness is seen by the alt-right as "the greatest threat to their liberty". Alt-rightists often employ the term "Cultural Marxism"—originally coined in reference to a specific form of Marxist thought, popularised among the U.S. right-wing in the 1990s—in reference to a perceived leftist conspiracy to alter society. They apply the term "Cultural Marxism" to a broad range of left movements.

=== Governance, isolationism, and anti-interventionism ===
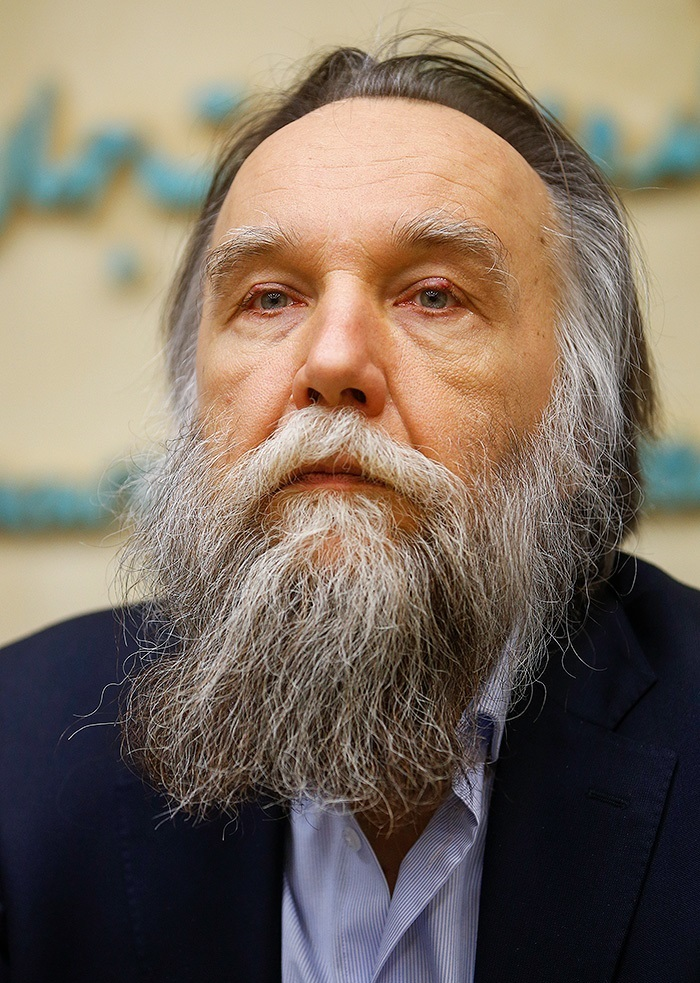
The Russian far-right theorist Aleksandr Dugin was popular with the alt-right.

Anglin claimed that the goal of the alt-right was to form an authoritarian government. Writing in The New Yorker, the journalist Andrew Marantz claimed that neo-monarchists were among the alt-right. The alt-right has no specific platform on U.S. foreign policy, although it has been characterized as being non-interventionist, as well as isolationist. Generally, it opposes established Republican Party views on foreign policy issues. Alt-rightists typically opposed President Bush's war on terror policies, and spoke against the 2017 Shayrat missile strike. The alt-right has no interest in spreading democracy abroad and opposes the United States' close relationship with Israel.

The alt-right often looks favorably on Russian President Vladimir Putin, viewing him as a strong, nationalistic white leader who defends his country from both radical Islam, and Western liberalism. Spencer praised Putin's Russia as the "most powerful white power in the world", while prominent alt-rightist Matthew Heimbach called Putin "the leader of the free world". Although during the Cold War, the American Right often presented the Soviet Union as the main threat to the U.S., links between the American far-right and Russia grew during the 2000s, when prominent far-right activists like David Duke visited the country; the latter described Russia as being "key to White survival". The far-right Russian political theorist Aleksandr Dugin is also viewed positively by the alt-right. Dugin has written for Spencer's websites, and Spencer's estranged wife, the ethnically Russian Nina Kouprianova, has translated some of Dugin's work into English. Many alt-rightists also regard Syrian president Bashar al-Assad as a heroic figure for standing up to rebel groups in the Syrian Civil War. Heimbach has endorsed a Shi'ite axis between al-Assad's Syria, Iran, and Hezbollah in Lebanon, seeing them as allies in the global struggle against Zionism.

=== Anti-feminism and misogyny ===
Favoring a more patriarchal society, the alt-right is anti-feminist. Unlike many U.S. conservatives, the alt-right does not argue its anti-feminist position from traditional Christian perspectives. Instead, the alt-right claims that it is rooted in what it calls "sex realism", arguing that as a result of their biological differences, men and women are suited to different tasks in society. Lyons commented that the alt-right was misogynistic and presented women as irrational and vindictive. Although a minority in the movement, the alt-right has female members who support its anti-feminist stance; some prominent alt-right women, such as Lauren Southern, have experienced harassment and abuse from within the movement. The Daily Stormer, for instance, banned female contributors, and called for reduced female involvement in the white nationalist movement, producing an angry response from various white nationalist women. Within feminist circles, the alt-right's desired future was repeatedly compared to the Republic of Gilead, the fictional dystopia in Margaret Atwood's The Handmaid's Tale (1985) and its 2017 television adaptation.

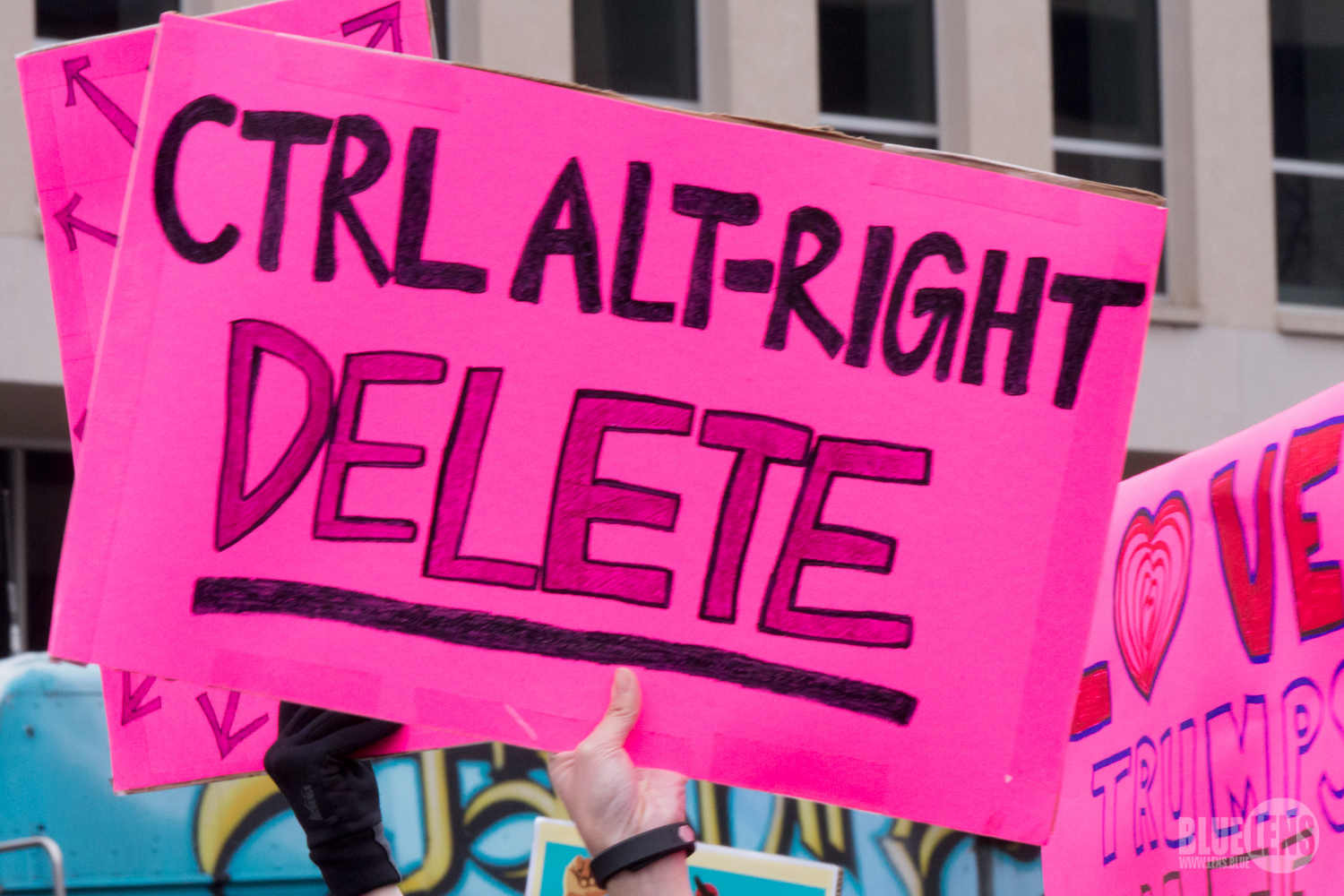
A placard criticizing the alt-right displayed at the 2017 Women's March

The alt-right intersects with the manosphere, an online anti-feminist subculture, including the men's rights movement, which believes that men face more oppression in Western society than women. It adopts the movement's view that feminism has undermined and emasculated men, and believes that men should aggressively reassert their masculinity so as not to become "beta males" or "cucks". There has been some clear influence between the two movements; prominent manosphere ideologue Roosh V, for instance, attended an NPI conference, and quoted antisemitic material from white nationalist sources in his articles. Some alt-right figures have distanced themselves from the manosphere and its proponents; Greg Johnson of Counter-Currents Publishing was of the view that "the manosphere morally corrupts men", because it does not promote "the resurgence of traditional and biologically based sexual norms".

The alt-right displays far less interest in homosexuality and abortion than the U.S. conservative movement, with alt-rightists taking varying perspectives on these topics. Hawley suggested that the alt-right was more broadly sympathetic to legal abortion access than the conservative movement; many alt-rightists support abortion access, because of its disproportionate use by African-American and Hispanic-American women. Some on the alt-right consider homosexuality to be immoral and a threat to the survival of the white race, with alt-right trolls having employed homophobic terminology like "faggot". A combination of homophobia and anti-globalism have produced the concept of "globohomo", a variant of the "Cultural Marxism" conspiracy theory. Others adopt a more tolerant stance, and have praised gay white nationalists. This reflects a broader trend among white nationalists to denigrate gay culture, while being more tolerant of gay writers and musicians whose views they sympathize with, like James O'Meara, and Douglas Pearce.

=== Religion ===
The alt-right is broadly secular. Many of its members are atheists, or highly skeptical of organized religion and God. Some alt-rightists identify as Christians; The Right Stuff, for instance, hosted an alt-right Christian podcast called "The Godcast". There are also individuals in the movement who do not believe in Christian teachings but identify as cultural Christians, admiring the Christian heritage of Western society. Others on the alt-right oppose Christianity entirely, criticizing it for its Jewish roots, for being a universal religion that seeks to cross racial boundaries, and for encouraging what they see as a "slave morality" that they contrast with perceived ancient aristocratic values. Some elements pursue modern Paganism. White evangelical leaders of the Southern Baptist Church have angered the alt-right by expressing support for refugees entering the U.S., calling for measures to help undocumented migrants gain legal status, and urging members not to display the Confederate Battle Flag. Despite this, alt-right hostility to Christianity has waned over time, with many alt-right commentators identifying as Christian, while rejecting mainstream Christian politics and most mainstream Christian religious leaders, especially Pope Francis. The Mormon-related hashtag #DezNat – which targets pornography, the LGBTQ community, Mormon apostates and progressives, sometimes violently (see blood atonement) – has also been linked to the alt-right.

Several press sources have linked the alt-right to Islamophobia, and Wendling stated that alt-rightists view Islam as a fundamental threat to Western society. Hawley expressed the view that "ironically, people on the Alt-Right are less Islamophobic than many mainstream conservatives". He observed that many U.S. conservatives criticized Muslim migration to the United States, because they regarded Islam as a threat to liberty; the alt-right has made little use of this argument. For alt-rightists, migration from Islamic-majority countries is undesirable not because the migrants are Muslims, but because most of them are non-white; it is equally opposed to non-white migrants who are Christian or non-religious.

== Structure ==
Alt-right groups live, recruit and coordinate (and hence evolve) online. And from what we can already see, they do so pretty much exactly like the pro-ISIS groups evolve and coordinate, but Facebook has so far been less quick to shut them down.

— Neil Johnson, extremist researcher

The academic Timothy J. Main characterized it as an "ideological movement" interested more in spreading its ideas, rather than operating as a social movement or political party, while according to Hawley, the alt-right was "a disorganized mob that broadly shares a number of goals and beliefs". The alt-right is not an organized movement, and has no formal institutions or leading elite. It is a predominantly online phenomenon, lacking print newspapers, and has little radio or television presence. It had no think tanks that influenced government policy, and could not command the open allegiance of any major politicians or mainstream pundits. Unlike many counter-cultural movements, it lacked soft power in the form of original bands, songs, films, and other cultural artifacts, of which it produced very few. According to Hawley, it was the movement's success in using the Internet that allowed it "to punch above its weight in the political arena".

The alt-right made use of a large number of blogs, podcasts, forums, and webzines, in which it discussed far-right political and cultural ideas. The use of the Internet by the far-right was not pioneered by the alt-right; the white supremacist web forum Stormfront had, for instance, been active since 1996. Where the alt-right differed was in its members willingness to leave far-right websites, and engage in trolling on other parts of the Internet, such as the comments sections of major news websites, as well as popular social media applications, such as YouTube, and Twitter. According to Hawley, it was the alt-right's use of trolling which put it "into the national conversation". The movement's online structure had strengths, in that it allowed members to say things anonymously online, that they would not be willing to say on the street, or any other public place. The lack of any formal organization also meant that nobody could be kicked out of the alt-right.

As the alt-right developed, a number of formal, real world events were held, particularly through the National Policy Institute. Members of the alt-right have also attended events organized by an older far-right white nationalist group, American Renaissance. These events have gained a more limited audience than the alt-right's online activities. This may be because operating online allows members of the alt-right to operate anonymously, while to attend events they must often expose themselves to journalists and protesters, thus making it more likely that their views will become publicly known. U.S. alt-rightists have also sought to build links with other far-right and white nationalist groups elsewhere in the world. Heimbach, for instance, addressed meetings of the Golden Dawn in Greece and the National Democratic Party of Germany. Various U.S.-based alt-rightists used social media to encourage support for the Alternative for Germany party in that country's 2017 federal election. The scholar Sitara Thobani argued for a convergence between the U.S. alt-right and Hindu nationalism in India.

== Tactics ==
Main argued that a characteristic of the alt-right was its use of vitriolic language, including "race-baiting, coarse ethnic humor, prejudicial stereotyping, vituperative criticism, and the flaunting of extremist symbols". In The New Yorker, the journalist Benjamin Wallace-Wells noted that the alt-right sought to test "the strength of the speech taboos that revolve around conventional politics—of what can be said, and how directly"; members often made reference to freedom of speech when calling for their views to be heard in public discourse. Alt-rightists promoted their messages through Twitter hashtags such as "#WhiteGenocide", "#WhiteLivesMatter" and "#StandUpForEurope". A recurrent tactic of alt-rightists is to present themselves—as white men—as victims of oppression and prejudice; this subverts many leftist arguments about other social groupings being victims and is designed to infuriate leftist opponents.

The alt-right also make heavy use of imagery drawn from popular culture for its own purposes. For instance, the American singer Taylor Swift is often held up as an idealized example of "Aryan" beauty. When describing their own conversion to the movement, alt-rightists refer to themselves as having been "getting red pilled", a reference to a scene in the 1999 film The Matrix in which Neo, the protagonist, chooses to discover the truth behind reality by consuming a red pill. On alt-right blogs and message boards, members often discuss how they were "red-pilled" originally. Members that encourage others to conceal their actual beliefs to more easily spread their messages refer to this tactic as "hiding one's power levels", in reference to a scene from the anime Dragon Ball Z. Alt-rightists have also adopted milk as a symbol of their views; various members have used the words "Heil Milk" in their online posts while Spencer included an emoji of a glass of milk on his Twitter profile along with the statement that he was "very tolerant... lactose tolerant!" The animal studies scholar Vasile Stănescu suggested that this notion drew upon the 19th-century pseudoscientific idea that Northern Europeans had become biologically superior to many other human populations, because they consumed high quantities of milk and meat products.

=== Use of humor and irony ===
The alt-right makes strong use of humor and irony. As noted by Nagle, the alt-right's use of humor renders it difficult to tell "what political views were genuinely held and what were merely, as they used to say, for the lulz". By presenting an image which was much less threatening than that of earlier white nationalist groups, the alt-right was able to attract people who would be willing to visit its websites but who would not have considered attending neo-Nazi or KKK events. As noted by Hawley, "whereas older white nationalists came across as bitter, reactionary, and antisocial, much of the Alt-Right comes across as youthful, light-hearted, and jovial—even as it says the most abhorrent things about racial and religious minorities". Members of the alt-right sometimes mocked the earnestness and seriousness of earlier white nationalists such as William Pierce.

Another of the tactics employed online by alt-rightists is to parody their leftist opponents. One American alt-rightist, for instance, created a Twitter account for a fictional individual whom they described as an "LGBTQ+ pansexual nonbinary POC transwoman" who was a "Journalist for BLM [Black Lives Matter]. Always stayin woke". Alt-rightists also orchestrated pranks, again, to cause alarm among opponents. For instance, during the 2016 presidential campaign, alt-rightists presented claims that they were plotting to send representatives posing as officials to voting booths, where they would suppress ethnic minority turnout. There was no such plot, but press sources like Politico presented these claims as fact. This tendency toward trolling rendered it difficult for journalists to learn more about the alt-right, because any members they talked to were willing to deceive them for their own amusement. Nagle argued that the alt-right had inherited a transgressive style descending from the Marquis de Sade in the 18th century, but that with the alt-right this "the transgressive anti-moral style" reached "its final detachment from any egalitarian philosophy of the left or Christian morality of the right". Tait argued that many viewed alt-right content "for the politically transgressive content without embracing the political or philosophical vision of the alt-right."

=== Use of memes ===
The Pepe the Frog meme, originally created in 2005, was adopted by the alt-right and became a "mascot" for the movement.

Some members of the alt-right employ anime, such as the above moe character, in their online presence. This is believed to be due in part to the influence of 4chan.

The alt-right makes heavy use of memes, which became a defining trend of the movement in 2016, adopting much of its "image- and humor-based culture", including its heavy use of memes, from the online subcultures active at 4chan, and later 8chan. The prevalence of such memes in alt-right circles has led some commentators to question whether the alt-right is a serious movement rather than just an alternative way to express traditionally conservative beliefs, with Chava Gourarie of the Columbia Journalism Review stating that provoking a media reaction to these memes is for some creators an end in itself.

One of the most commonly used memes within the alt-right is Pepe the Frog. The Pepe meme was created by artist Matt Furie in 2005 and over following years spread through the Internet, being shared by pop stars like Nicki Minaj and Katy Perry. By 2014, Pepe was one of the most popular online memes, used among far-right trolls on 4chan and from there adopted by the alt-right. After Trump tweeted a meme of Pepe as himself, and his son Donald Trump Jr. posted a Pepe meme shortly after, alt-righters and 4channers began spreading the meme with political intent. According to writer Gary Lachman, Pepe became "the unofficial mascot of the alt-right movement". The use of Pepe spawned the satirical worship of the Ancient Egyptian frog-headed deity Kek, as well as satirical nationalism of the nonexistent nation of "Kekistan". "Clown World", a phrase used by the alt-right to express their distaste towards societies perceived to be too liberal or multiracial, is often used in conjunction with images of Pepe dressed like a clown, who they dub "Honkler". Another alt-right mascot was Moon Man, an unofficial parody of McDonald's 1980s Mac Tonight character. Alt-rightists posted videos to YouTube, in which Moon Man rapped to songs they had composed like "Black Lives Don't Matter" by a text-to-speech synthesizer.

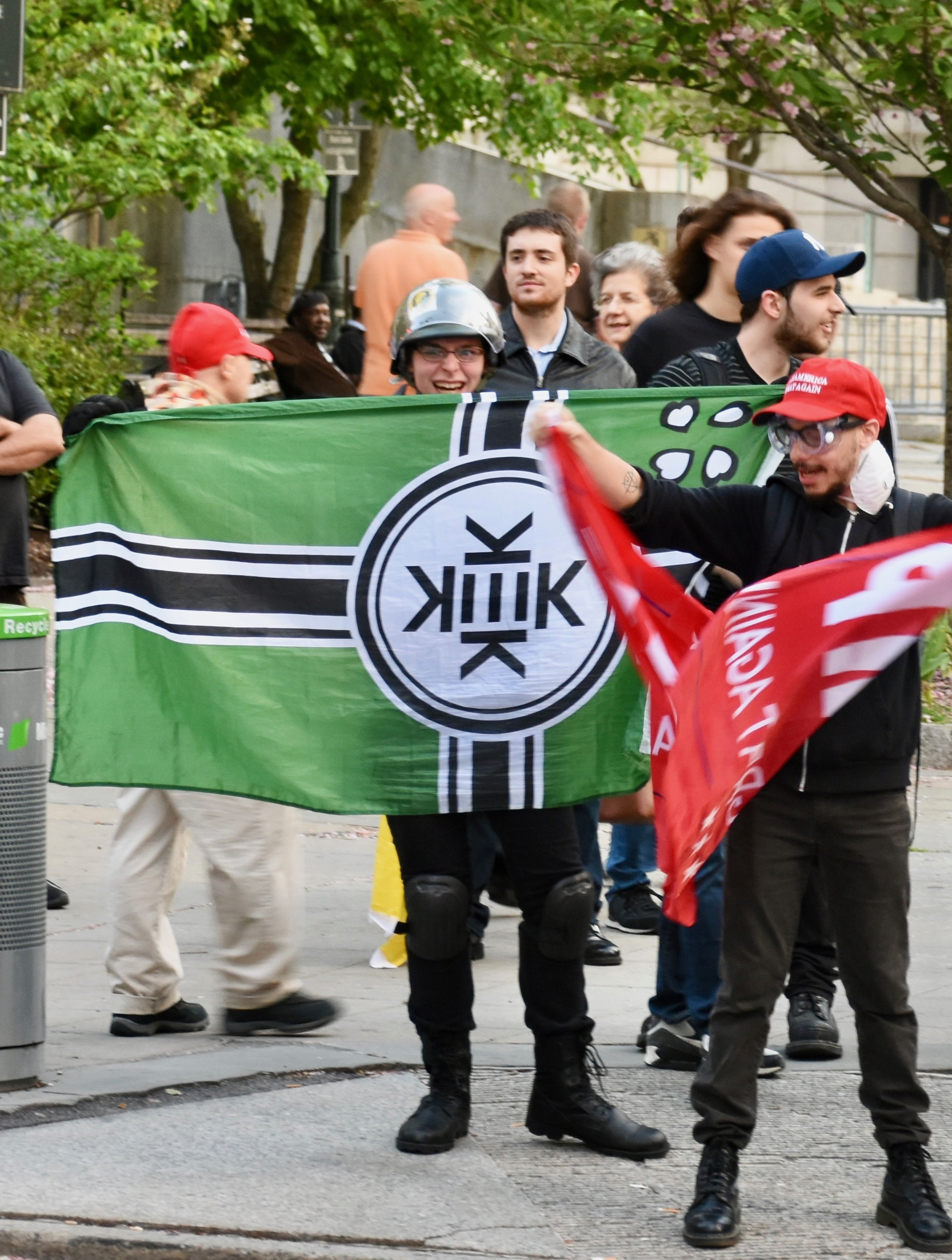
A young man displaying the flag of Kekistan at a pro-Trump rally; the flag is an alt-right symbol.

The alt-right used specific terms for individuals outside the movement. Whites who were not part of the movement were called "normies"; homosexuals, and whites who socialized with people of color, were referred to as "degenerates". An alt-right acronym was "WEIRD", for "Western, educated, industrialised, rich and democratic people". Mainstream conservatives were denigrated as "cuckservatives", a portmanteau of "cuckold" and "conservative". The term "cuckold" pertains to a man with an unfaithful wife; the alt-right saw this as analogous to the role of the U.S. conservative movement in assisting non-whites in the U.S. (Note: The derivative term "cuck" also refers to a genre of pornography in which men watch their wives or girlfriends have sex with another man.) Various terms were used for leftists. Those who expressed progressive views, particularly online, were characterized as "social justice warriors" (SJWs). Individuals who expressed leftist opinions on Tumblr—and who alt-rightists often stereotyped as fat, ugly feminists—were called "Tumblrinas". The term "snowflake", short for "special snowflake", was used as a pejorative for such individuals, and in reference to leftist uses of "trigger warnings", alt-rightists expressed a desire to "trigger" leftists by upsetting them. Leftists who professed victim status while harassing or bullying others were labeled "crybullies", while leftists who were perceived to be stupid were labeled "libtards", a portmanteau of "liberal" and "retard". "NPC", derived from "Non-player characters" which are ubiquitous in video games, is used to disparage opponents of the alt-right by implying they are incapable of independent thought, and can only mindlessly repeat the same arguments and accusations against the alt-right.

When referring to African-Americans, alt-rightists regularly employed the meme "dindu nuffin"—a bastardization of "didn't do nothing"—in reference to claims of innocence by arrested African-Americans. On this basis, alt-rightists referred to black people as "dindus". Events involving black people were called "chimpouts", rhetorically linking them with chimpanzees. Alt-rightists also used memes to ironically support the Black Egyptian hypothesis, often using stereotypical African-American vernacular such as "We wuz kangz n shieet" ("We was kings and shit"). Following the murder of Ahmaud Arbery in 2020, "jogger" was adopted by some members as a euphemism for "nigger" in reference to how Arbery was killed while jogging, and because both words sounded similar. Refugees were often referred to as "rapefugees", a reference to incidents like the 2015–16 New Year's Eve sexual assaults in Germany, in which non-white refugees were reported to have sexually assaulted white women. Another meme the alt-right employed was to place triple parentheses around Jewish names; this started at The Right Stuff to highlight the presence of Jewish Americans in the media and academia. One alt-rightist created a Google Chrome plug in that would highlight Jewish names online.

Alt-rightists often utilized older white nationalist slogans, such as the Fourteen Words: "We must secure the existence of our people and a future for white children", that "Anti-racist is a code for anti-white", and that "Diversity is a code word for white genocide". From the latter, alt-rightists produced the hashtag reduction "#WhiteGenocide" for use on Twitter, highway billboards, and flyers. Also used was the slogan "It's OK to be white" as a way of expressing a supposed reverse racism towards white people by minorities. The use of "Deus Vult!" and various other crusader iconography was employed to express Islamophobic sentiment. Also apparent were "helicopter ride" memes, which endorse documented cases of leftists being dropped from helicopters by Chilean and Argentine juntas. Similarly, the term "Right-Wing Death Squad" (usually abbreviated as RWDS) also callbacks to the "helicopter ride" meme and to refer to far-right, fascist death squads. Additional online features of the alt-right included references to Fashwave, a neo-fascist subgenre of electronic music microgenre vaporwave.

=== Harassment ===
Wendling noted that campaigns of abuse for political ends were "a classic alt-right tactic", while Hawley called the alt-right "a subset of the larger Internet troll culture". This trolling both contributed to creating racial discord, and generated press attention for the movement. Those most regularly targeted were Jewish journalists, mainstream conservative journalists, and celebrities who publicly criticized Trump. Such harassment was usually spontaneous rather than pre-planned, but in various cases, many alt-right trolls piled on once the harassment had begun. After criticizing Trump and the alt-right, the conservative journalist David A. French—who is white—received much abuse referencing his white wife and adopted black daughter. Alt-right trolls sent him images of his daughter in a gas chamber, and repeatedly claimed that he liked to watch his wife have sex with "black bucks". As a result of the Pizzagate conspiracy theory, the artist Arrington de Dionyso, whose murals are frequently displayed at the Comet Ping Pong pizzeria, also experienced abuse from the alt-right. In 2017, a wave of threats began being made to Jewish Community Centers which some press sources attributed to the alt-right. Another Jewish target was the conservative commentator Ben Shapiro, who was sent messages stating that he and his children "will go to the ovens".

Not all targets were U.S. citizens. In what it called "Operation: Filthy Jew Bitch", The Daily Stormer encouraged its followers to send abuse to the British Member of Parliament (MP) Luciana Berger, who is Jewish; images sent to her featured a yellow star on her head, accompanied by the hashtag "Hitlerwasright". One UK-based alt-rightist was convicted for his involvement in the campaign. In another instance, Anglin commented on the June 2016 murder of the British MP Jo Cox by a far-right activist, by saying that "Jo Cox was evil and she deserved to die. Her death was not a tragedy, it was justice". While celebrating violence, The Daily Stormer is cautious to remain on the legal side of U.S. incitement laws.

== Demographics ==
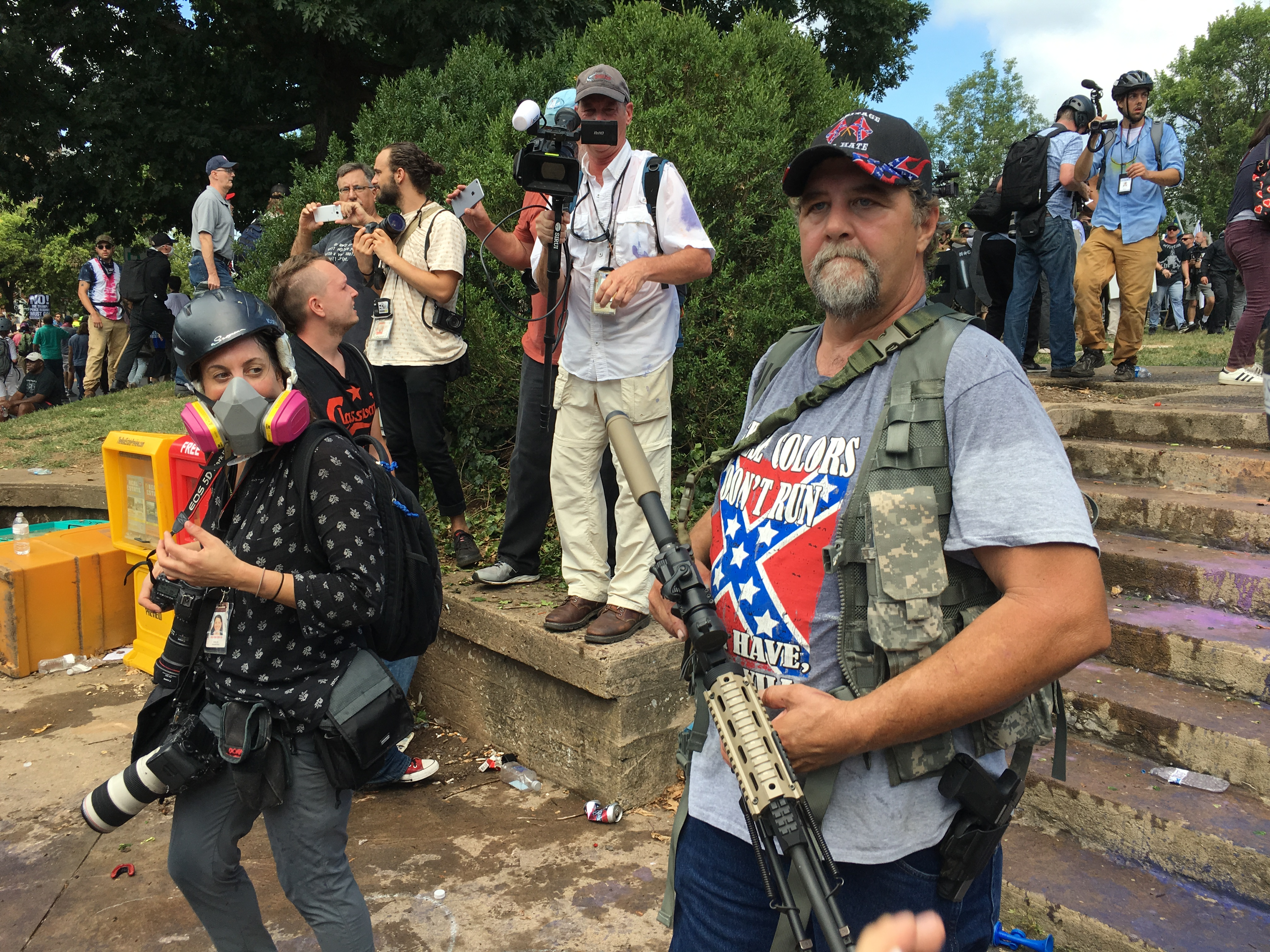
An attendee at the Unite the Right rally carrying a firearm and wearing a Confederate battle flag T-shirt

=== Geographical distribution ===
The alt-right's anonymized and decentralized nature makes it difficult to determine how many individuals are involved in it, or the demographic attributes of this membership. The movement's members are concentrated in the United States, but with participants present in other Anglophone countries, such as Canada, Britain, and Australia, as well as in parts of continental Europe. While acknowledging that the U.S. was "central" to the alt-right, Hermansson et al stressed that it was an "international phenomenon".

=== Statistics ===
Alt-rightists have provided their own opinions on its numbers; in 2016, Anglin thought it had a "cohesive constituency" of between 4 million and 6 million people, while Griffin believed it had a core membership in the hundreds of thousands, with a larger range of sympathizers. Main determined that, between September 2016 and February 2018, alt-right websites received a combined average of 1.1 million unique visitors per month, compared to 46.9 million unique visitors to broader right-wing sites, and 94.3 million for left-wing sites. He deemed the size of the alt-right to be "miniscule [sic]". Thomas Main estimated through web traffic that alt-right websites, excluding Breitbart News, had a readership the size of small magazines such as Commentary or Dissent.

In 2017, following the Charlottesville car attack, an ABC News/Washington Post poll found out that 10% of all Americans supported the alt-right. In their 2020 study on the matter, researchers Patrick Forscher and Nour Kteily estimated the support for the alt-right at 6% among the general American population, a number which rises to 10% among Trump supporters.

=== Age and gender ===
The alt-right is majority male, although Hawley suggested that about 20% of its support might be female. From the nature of the online discourse as well as the attendees of events organized by NPI and American Renaissance, Hawley believed that the majority of alt-right participants are younger on average than the participants of most previous American far-right groups. Wendling believed that a large portion of the alt-right were university students or recent graduates, many bearing a particular grudge against the political correctness encountered on campus; the alt-right ideologue Greg Johnson believed that the movement was attracting a higher percentage of better-educated Americans than prior white nationalist groups, due to declining opportunities and standards of living for graduates during the 2010s. Wendling also thought that alt-rightists tried to position themselves as "a cool posse of young intelligent kids", but that this was misleading. He determined that many of those active on alt-right forums were middle-aged men from working-class backgrounds. Tait said that younger members of the alt-right "recognized that the internet let them make an end run around the systems that marginalized their forebears. It's this younger cohort in particular that formed the [movement]". Tait also said "that a large segment of the movement was composed of young, male YouTubers and memelords who advanced misogynistic, anti-liberal, antisemitic, and often racist ideas as they shitposted pro-Trump or anti-progressive memes under absurd pseudonyms".

=== Casual factors ===
On interviewing young alt-rightists, Hawley noted that many revealed that they embraced far-right politics in response to the growing racial polarization of the Obama era; in particular, the public debates around the shootings of Trayvon Martin and Michael Brown, and the rise of the Black Lives Matter movement. Hawley suggested that many of these young people were willing to embrace the idea of dismantling the United States in favor of a new, white ethnostate, because they had grown up in the U.S. during the post-civil rights era. In contrast, he thought, older white nationalists were keener to retain links to patriotic American imagery, because they nostalgically recalled a period of U.S. history when segregation and overt white dominance were a part of life, and believed that this system could be reinstated. The psychologists Patrick S. Forscher and Nour S. Kteily conducted a study of 447 self-identified alt-right members, and found that they had higher rates of dark triad traits than non-Trump supporters. Forscher and Kteily also noted that the alt-rightists' psychological profiles bore similarities to those of Trump supporters more broadly, although displayed greater optimism about the economy, a higher bias against black people, and a higher rate of support for white collective action than other Trump supporters.

The political scientist Philip W. Gray cited several reasons for the alt-right's emergence. In his analysis, new online media had reduced the conservative movement's ability to enforce its boundaries against the far-right, while the growing distance of World War II meant that pride in the U.S. victory over Nazi Germany and Fascist Italy provided less of a barrier to the American far-right, than it had when large numbers of people still remembered the conflict. Gray also argued that the alt-right was a reaction against the left-wing racial and social agitation of the 2010s, in particular the Black Lives Matter movement, and the popularization of concepts like white privilege and male privilege, as well as events like the racial unrest in Baltimore and Ferguson, and the shooting of police officers in Dallas and Baton Rouge.

The scholar of American studies Annie Kelly argued that the alt-right was influenced by a pervasive "discourse of anxiety about traditional white masculinity" in mainstream U.S. culture. In her view, much of the "groundwork" for this discourse was set forth by the conservative movement, in the years following the September 11 attacks in 2001. Hawley concurred that some U.S. conservatives, such as Ann Coulter, had contributed to the alt-right's rise through their attacks on political correctness, as part of which they had "effectively delegitimized complaints about hate speech and racism". Some conservatives, like columnist Matt K. Lewis, have agreed with this assessment.

Drawing comparisons with the tale of The Boy Who Cried Wolf, the commentator Angela Nagle also suggested that "the hysterical liberal call-out" culture of the 2010s, in which "everyone from saccharine pop stars to Justin Trudeau [was called] a 'white supremacist' and everyone who wasn't With Her a sexist" made it more difficult for people to recognize when a far-right movement really emerged online. Disagreeing with Nagle's view that the alt-right was primarily a "response to the stupidity of marginal Internet liberalism", the anti-fascist reporter Jay Firestone—who had spent three months undercover in New York's alt-right community—instead argued that it was a "response to decades of decline in standards of living for working people, amid the proliferation of unemployment and meaningless, dead-end jobs".

== Links to violence and terrorism ==
"The sprawling networks the alt-right has built around its poisonous, racist ideology have violence at its core in its pursuit of a white ethnostate. The white, male grievance culture that the leaders of the alt-right are incubating has already inspired more than 40 deaths and left more than 60 people injured.

And unfortunately, the alt-right seems likely to inspire more, as it moves further into the real world. Its leaders continue to abdicate all responsibility for the violence their ideology inspires and are becoming increasingly recalcitrant in the face of widespread condemnation.

... After a year [2017] of escalating alt-right violence, we are probably in for more".

— The Southern Poverty Law Center, 2018

In 2017, Hawley noted that the alt-right was not a violent movement, but that this could potentially change. From their analysis of online discourse, Phillips and Yi concluded that "rather than violence, most Alt-Right members focus on discussing and peacefully advocating their values". They added that presenting the alt-right as a violent, revolutionary movement, or equating all alt-rightists with the 1488 scene—which was a "rhetorical tactic" for progressives—was "an intellectual failure akin to treating all Muslims or black nationalists as radicals and terrorists".

Conversely, Wending noted that there were individuals on the extreme end of the alt-right willing to use violence. He stated that "the culture of the alt-right is breeding its own brand of terrorists: socially isolated young men who are willing to kill". The alt-right movement has been considered by some political researchers a terrorist movement and the process of alt-right radicalization has been compared to Islamic terrorism by political scientists and leaders. A paper on the subject stated that it clearly fell under an extremist movement, saying that "alt-right adherents also expressed hostility that could be considered extremist: they were quite willing to blatantly dehumanize both religious/national outgroups and political opposition groups".

=== Violent incidents ===
In February 2018, the Southern Poverty Law Center assembled a list of 13 violent incidents between 2014 and 2018 perpetrated by alt-right influenced people, in which 43 people died and 67 people were injured. The perpetrators of these events were all male between the ages of 17 and 37, with an average age of just over 25 years old (only three of them were over 30). All but one was American; the other was Canadian. Dylann Roof spent much time reading alt-right websites before carrying out the 2015 Charleston church shooting. However, he took greater interest in older white nationalist writers and groups, like the Council of Conservative Citizens and the Northwest Front. In December 2017, the 21-year old William Edward Atchison shot dead two students at Aztec High School in Aztec, New Mexico before killing himself. Atchison's online activity had included posting pro-Hitler and pro-Trump thoughts on alt-right websites like The Daily Stormer, under such usernames as "Future Mass Shooter" and "Adam Lanza", and joking about school shootings, in particular the Columbine High School massacre.

An alt-righter named Taylor Wilson, who had attended the Unite the Right Rally, was charged with attempting a terror attack on an Amtrak train in October 2017. It was reported that he held a business card from the American-based neo-Nazi political party National Socialist Movement. In October 2018, Robert Bowers opened fire on a synagogue in Pittsburgh, killing 11 and injuring 6. He was a member of a fringe social network called Gab, where he posted a message indicating an immediate intent to harm just prior to the shooting; Bowers had a history of extreme antisemitic postings on Gab. The website is a favorite of alt-right users who are banned or suspended from other social networks. In August 2019, the self-described alt-right member James Patrick Reardon of New Middleton, Ohio was arrested, accused of threatening violence against local Jewish communities; an arsenal, or weaponry, was found in his home.

Various far-right militant groups have been linked with the alt-right. The Rise Above Movement (RAM), based in Southern California, has been linked to various violent acts, including participation in the Unite the Right rally. According to Oren Segal, director of the Anti-Defamation League's Center on Extremism, RAM constituted "an alt-right street-fighting club". Several press sources also described the Atomwaffen Division, a militant neo-Nazi group founded in the U.S. in 2013, as being part of the alt-right. The group was responsible for five murders, several of which were of other alleged group members. Far-right groups outside the U.S. have also been influenced by the alt-right. The Stawell-Times News noted that Antipodean Resistance, an Australian neo-Nazi group, had links to the alt-right online subculture. The group, which makes use of Nazi symbols such as the swastika and the Nazi salute, has explicitly called for the legalization of the murder of Jews. The group was initially involved in vandalism and organizing training camps, although various commentators warned that it might turn to terrorism, and should be proscribed.

== Reactions ==
Hawley thought that, because of its use of novel tactics not previously used by the far-right, "the Alt-Right represents something genuinely new on the American political scene", while Main believed that the alt-right represented "the first new philosophical competitor in the West" to the liberal democratic system since the fall of the Soviet Union. Lyons stated that the alt-right "helped revitalize White nationalist and male supremacist politics in the United States", while according to Neiwert, the alt-right gave white nationalism "a fresh new life, rewired for the twenty-first century". Kelly noted that while it was "important not to overstate" the size of the alt-right, its success lay primarily in its dissemination of far-right ideas and in making anti-leftist rhetoric more acceptable in mainstream discourse.

A December 2016 Pew Research Center survey found 54% of U.S. adults had heard "nothing at all" about the alt-right, 28% had heard "a little", and 17% "a lot". A poll by ABC News and The Washington Post found that 10% of respondents supported the alt-right, to 50% who opposed it. An Ipsos and Reuters poll found 6% of respondents supported the movement. Such polls indicate that while millions of Americans are supportive of the alt-right's message, they remain a clear minority.

Trump's election precipitated the publication of various books on the alt-right. In 2018, the documentary film Alt-Right: Age of Rage was released. Directed by Adam Bhala Lough, it included interviews with Spencer and Taylor as well as with anti-fascist activists devoted to combatting the alt-right.

=== Opposition to the alt-right ===
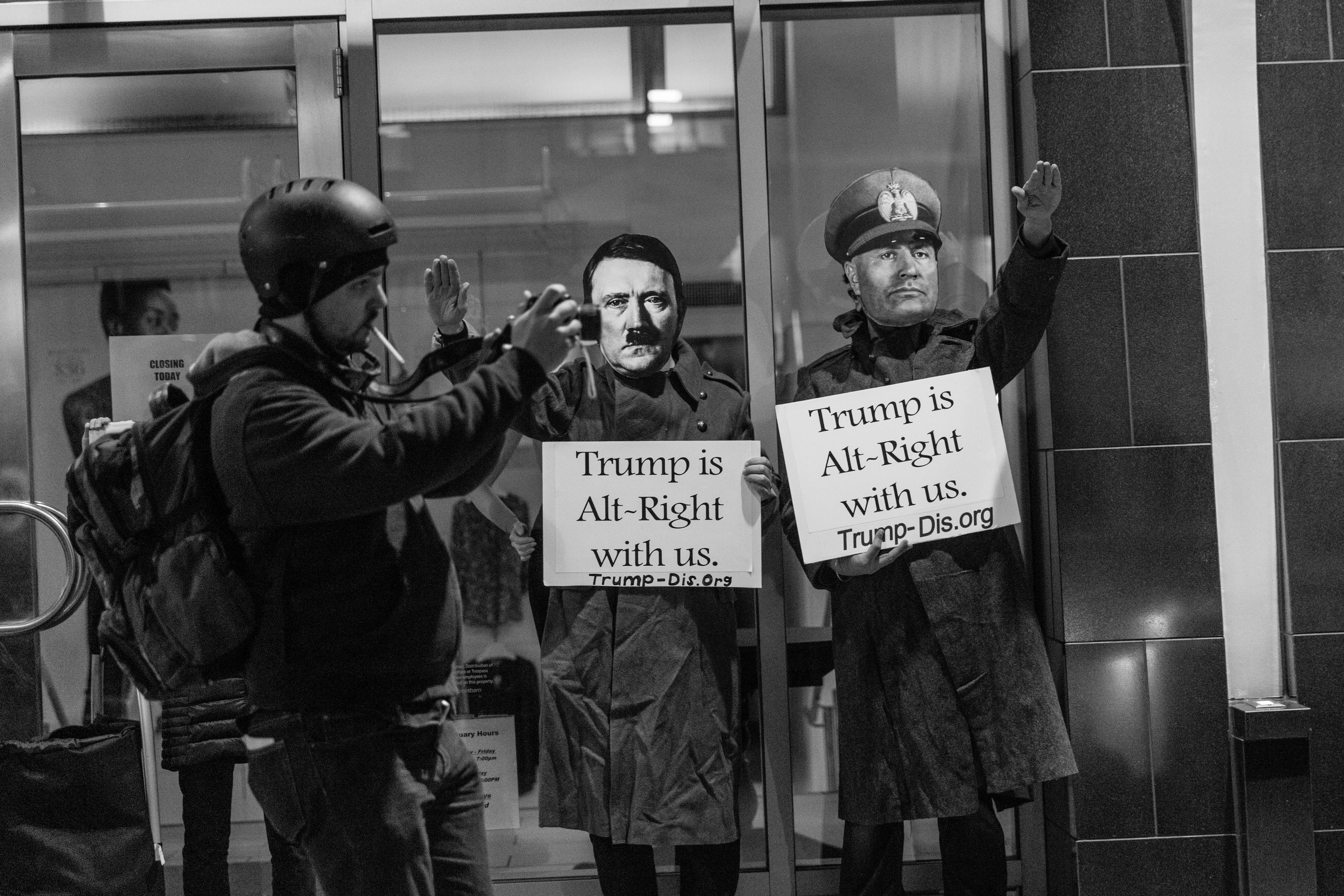
"Trump is Alt-Right with Us". Anti-Trump protesters highlight what they regard as his links to the alt-right and to historical fascism by dressing as Hitler and Mussolini.

The alt-right presented "a unique set of challenges" to journalists, progressives, and conservatives. Its opponents failed to agree on how to respond to it, with there being much discussion in U.S. public discourse on how to avoid its normalization. Some opponents emphasized "calling out" tactics, labeling the alt-right with terms like "racist", "sexist", "homophobic", and "white supremacist" in the belief that doing so would scare people away from it. Many commentators urged journalists not to refer to the alt-right by its chosen name, but rather with terms like "neo-Nazi"; in 2017, the Associated Press for instance advised journalists to avoid the term. The activist group Stop Normalizing developed the "Stop Normalizing Alt Right" Chrome extension, which changes the term "alt-right" on webpages to "white supremacy".

Some on the political right, including Yiannopoulos, argued that the alt-right's appeal would be diffused if society accepted many of its less extreme demands, including curbing political correctness and ending mass immigration. Commentators like the conservative David Frum suggested that if issues like immigration policy were discussed more openly in public discourse, then the alt-right would no longer be able to monopolize them. Commentators have also highlighted the theoretical commonalities between the white identity politics of the alt-right and the forms of identity politics widely embraced on the American Left in the 2010s, with Yiannopoulos commenting that if the American Left wanted to continue using identity politics as the basis of much of its mobilization, it would have to accept white identity politics as a permanent fixture of the political landscape.

Some opponents sought to undermine the alt-right's stereotype of leftists as being devoid of humor and joy, by using its own tactics of humor and irony against it; for instance, by labelling angry alt-rightists as "snowflakes" who were being "triggered". Anti-fascists also adopted the alt-right's use of pranks. On several occasions, they publicized meet-ups to destroy Confederate monuments or gravestones. Alt-rightists mobilized to stop them, only to find that no such anti-fascist event was happening at all.

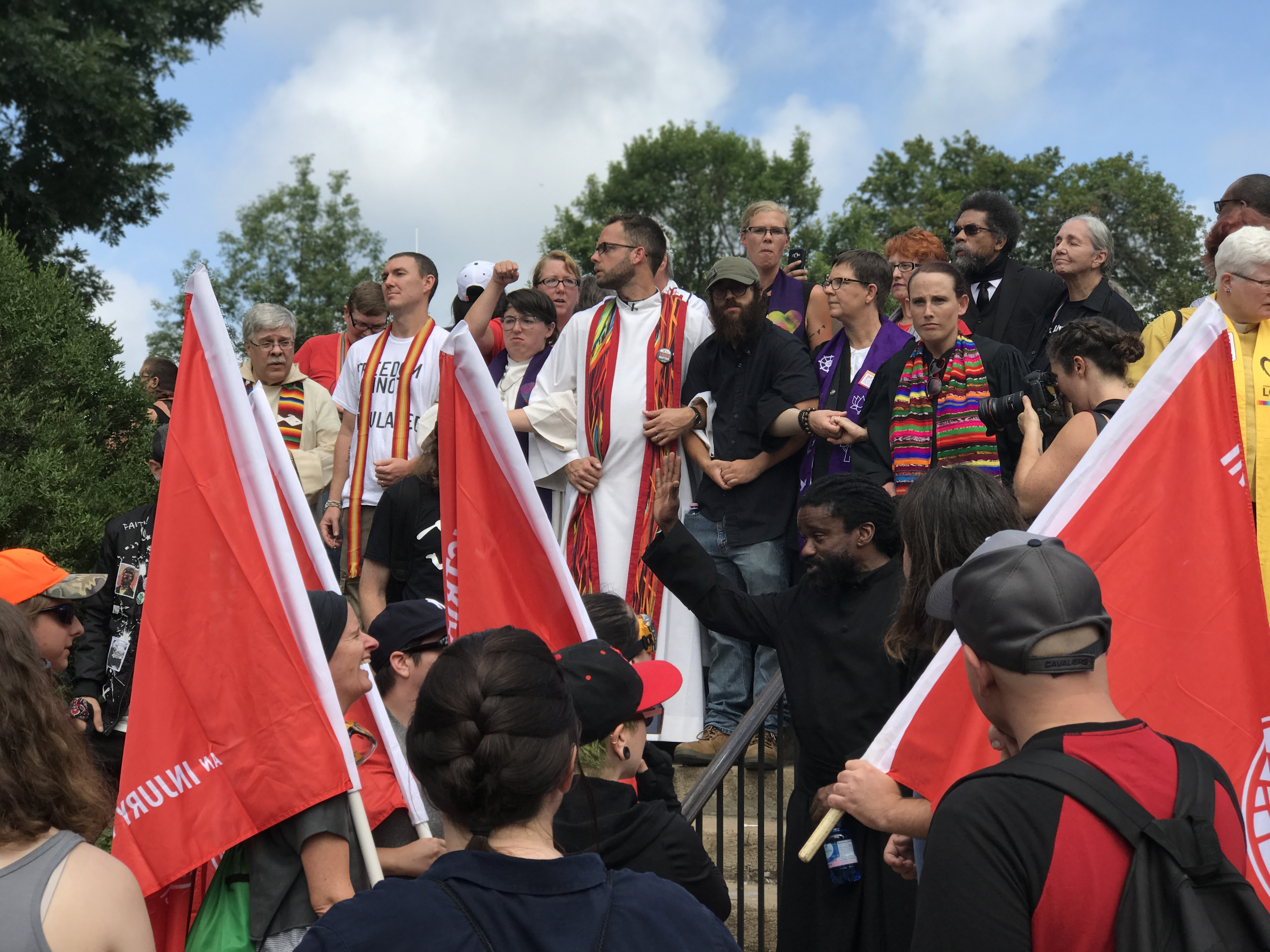
Counter-protesters at the 2017 Unite the Right rally

Various opponents employed doxing, publicly revealing the identities and addresses of alt-rightists, many of whom had previously acted anonymously. This discourages individuals from involving themselves in alt-right activities, as they fear that being outed as alt-rightists might result in job loss, social ostracization, or violence. From 2016 onward, some anti-fascists also resorted to physical confrontation and violence against the movement. On Trump's inauguration day, for example, a masked anti-fascist punched Spencer in the face when he was talking to reporters; the footage was widely shared online. Hawley noted that this tactic could be counter-productive to the alt-right's opponents, as it reinforces the narrative that alt-rightists peacefully engaging in their constitutionally protected right to free speech were being victimized.

Other commentators called for more vigorous policing of the web by governments and companies to deal with the alt-right. If denied access to mainstream social media outlets, the alt-right would be restricted to far-right websites like Stormfront, and thus, isolated from those not already committed to its cause. Many alt-rightists concur that denying it access to social media would devastate its ability to proselytize. However, it has also been suggested that such censorship could backfire and aid alt-right recruitment, as it would play into the alt-right narrative that the establishment was marginalizing those campaigning for white interests. Suppressing the alt-right in this manner would also set a precedent which could be repeated for other groups in future, including leftist ones. Phillips and Yi argued that such leftist attempts to prevent alt-right speech reflected a growing "authoritarian shift" within the American Left, among whom "limiting or preventing the public speech" of white males was increasingly seen as an acceptable method for equalizing "power relations" between racial and gender groups.

=== "Alt-left" ===
In the 1990s, a loose group of left-wing online activists based on Usenet groups referred to themselves as "alternative left" or "alt-left" to distinguish their ideas from those of more mainstream leftist thought. Ideas promoted by "alt-left" activists at the time included universal basic income and anti-work sentiment. The popularisation of the term "alt-right" in the 2010s saw the increasing use of "alt-left" to describe far-left groups; among the press sources that did so were Fox News in December 2016, and Vanity Fair in March 2017. After the Unite the Right Rally later that year, Trump commented that some counter-protesters were part of the "very, very violent ... alt-left". Commentator Brian Dean believed that Trump was essentially conflating the term "alt-left" with "anti-fascist". Responding to Trump's use of the term, various commentators criticised the use of "alt-left", claiming that it was neither created nor adopted by leftists but had been designed by right-wingers and/or centrist liberals to smear left-wing protesters by suggesting a false equivalence between the alt-right and their opponents. (Note: Attributed to multiple sources:) The historian Timothy D. Snyder stated that "'alt-right' is a term ... meant to provide a fresh label that would sound more attractive than 'Nazi,' 'neo-Nazi,' 'white supremacist,' or 'white nationalist.' With 'alt-left' it's a different story. There is no group that labels itself that way". The term "alt-left" has also been used to describe anti-liberal leftists who use conspiratorial framing.

=== Non-Western counterparts ===
Alt-right memes, slang, and imagery have been adopted by some people outside the Western world in order to promote different extremist ideologies from white nationalism. Examples include the "akh-right", which is Islamist, promoting similar policies to traditional Islamist groups like the Taliban but with a different aesthetic. Akh-right and alt-right supporters have bonded online over shared support for antisemitism, misogyny, homophobia, and the Taliban itself. Andrew Tate, a former kickboxer and social media influencer who converted to Islam, is popular with this subculture as well.

Trads, an Indian alt-right subculture, promote Hindutva, Brahmanical supremacy, and Islamophobia. They use a saffron-recolored version of Pepe the Frog, in order to avoid the original green color's association with Islam. Trads believe mainstream Hindu rightists such as Narendra Modi are insufficiently committed to true Hinduism.

== See also ==
- Alt-right pipeline
- Alternative media
- The Alt-Right Playbook
- Angry white male
- Authoritarian conservatism
  - Para-fascism
- Blood and soil
- Groypers
- Incitement to ethnic or racial hatred
- Neo-integralism
- Neo-nationalism
- Netto-uyoku
- Racism in the United States
- Right-wing authoritarianism
- Right-wing terrorism
- Trads (Hindutva)
- Uyoku dantai
- Ultraconservatism
