= 2022 alleged plot to kill Coutts RCMP officers =

Event in Alberta, Canada

- Date: February 2022
- Location: Coutts, Alberta, Canada
- Accused: Anthony Olienick; Chris Carbert; Christopher Lysak; Jerry Morin
- Charges: Conspiracy to murder (all four); Making or possessing an explosive device (Olienick)

In February 2022, four Canadian men were arrested on allegations that they conspired to kill Royal Canadian Mounted Police (RCMP) officers, which was not substantiated during the jury trial. The arrests occurred during the Canada convoy protest on the Coutts, Alberta, side of the Sweetgrass–Coutts Border Crossing. According to police, the plot was part of a wider plan to alter "Canada's political, justice and medical systems."

The Coutts protest and subsequent legal proceedings were the subject of a mini-documentary titled "Conspiracy in Coutts," produced by The Fifth Estate and released on November 15, 2024.

== Background ==
In January 2022, people protested in Coutts about their objections to public health measures implemented by Canadian governments in response to the COVID-19 pandemic. The protest was the start of a convoy of protesters that later proceeded to Ottawa. The protest blocked the border crossing to the United States. After hearing reports that protesters were planning to bring firearms to the protest and prepare for "war", police deployed undercover officers. Police also used telephone wiretaps to listen to mobile phones. Due to the perceived emergency, no prior judicial authorisation was obtained for the wiretaps, as is permitted by the Criminal Code of Canada.

According to police, on February 10, protester Anthony Olienick informed two undercover police officers that he was expecting a delivery, which the officers understood to be a bag of firearms. Police officers stated that they observed Olienick, Chris Carbert, and Jerry Morin receiving a package.

== Arrests ==
A search warrant was executed by police just after midnight on February 14, 2022. Three trailers located in Coutts were searched by police who found fifteen firearms, ammunition, and body-armour with a Diagolon patch. Police found a handgun in Lysak's residential trailer and a rifle with a scope and rangefinder in Lysak's vehicle near Coutts. Another search of property owned by Anthony Olienick in rural Alberta discovered 36,098 rounds of ammunition, two pipe bombs, and several firearms.

Anthony Olienick, Chris Carbert, Christopher Lysak, and Jerry Morin were arrested and charged with conspiracy to murder. Olienick was also charged with making or possessing an explosive device.

Police ended the protest on February 15, 2022, after the arrests. Protestors cooperated with police, stating that they rejected the violence and firearms associated with the arrested men.

== Accused ==
=== Anthony Olienick ===
Anthony Olienick, also known as Tony Olienick, is the owner-operator of Claresholm trucking company. He was aged 40 in November 2022 and prior to his arrest, he lived in Claresholm.

According to Royal Canadian Mounted Police, Olienick was providing security for the protest, including providing video surveillance of police positions. Police believe that Olienick was plotting to kill police officers. On February 14, 2022, police discovered 36,098 rounds of ammunition, firearms, and two pipe-bombs on Olienick's property. Two Diagolon patches were also discovered during the search of his Coutts property that included a mobile home and two trailers. During police interviews, Anthony Olienick shared predictions that the Government of Canada sought to destroy the middle class, install a communist regime before the start of executions and use of gas chambers. Olienick, has been charged with conspiracy to commit murder. and with making or possessing an explosive device. He is being held in Lethbridge Correctional Centre during his trial.

=== Chris Lysak ===
Lysak was accused of plotting to kill police officers. On February 14, 2022, he was arrested and charged with conspiracy to murder, possession of a weapon, and mischief. During his police interviews, Lysak stated that he believed that the COVID-19 vaccinations presented deadly risks to children. He was denied bail in March 2022 and his request to skip the pretrial stage of the judicial process in April 2022 was also denied.

He was aged 48 in October 2022. Prior to his arrest, Lysak lived in Lethbridge, Alberta. Lysak is connected to the far-right protest group Diagolon and flew the group's flag outside his home. He is also connected to the group's leader, Jeremy MacKenzie.

On February 6, 2024, Lysak was released from jail after all charges in the indictment were withdrawn following his guilty plea to the lesser charge of 'possessing a licensed and registered handgun in a place that was not authorized'. For which Lysak received a 3-year sentence, which was satisfied by the two years already served plus time spent in segregation.

=== Chris Carbert ===
Carbert is accused of plotting to kill police officers. In February 2022, he was charged with conspiracy to murder, possession of a weapon, and mischief. During police interviews, Carbert expressed a desire to encourage Prime Minister Justin Trudeau and Alberta Premier Jason Kenney to resign. Carbert will be tried together with the three other co-accused, skipping the preliminary inquiry stage and proceeding directly to the Court of King's Bench of Alberta. Carbert is represented by lawyer Balfour Der.

Carbert also has links to Jeremy MacKenzie, of Diagolon. He posted a video to his Facebook page in which he repeated statements that he was ready to die while protesting government imposed public health measures. He was aged 45 in May 2022. Prior to his arrest, Carbert lived in Lethbridge, Alberta. Carbert has previous criminal convictions for assault, narcotics trafficking, and driving a vehicle while under the influence of alcohol.

=== Jerry Morin ===
Jerry Mitchell Morin was accused of plotting to kill police officers. He was arrested on February 14, 2022 while driving on Alberta Highway 2 near Coutts. He charged with conspiracy to murder, possession of a weapon for dangerous purpose, and mischief. Morin allegedly had two guns in his possession when he was arrested. During police interviews, Morin spoke of his perception that they were in World War III and that people were being made into slaves. The day prior to his arrest, Morin made a Facebook post describing the protest in Coutts as a war: "Come on down tonight, there's no excuses, this is war". Morin will be tried together with the three other co-accused, skipping the preliminary inquiry stage and proceeding directly to the Court of King's Bench of Alberta. Morin was aged 40 in July 2022. Prior to his arrest he lived in Olds, Alberta.

On February 6, 2024, Morin was released from jail after all charges in the indictment were withdrawn following his guilty plea to the lesser charge of 'conspiracy to traffic firearms'. For which Morin received a 3.25 year sentence, that was satisfied by the two years already served plus time spent in segregation.

== Legal proceedings ==
In court, police constable Trevor Checkley stated that, during the protest, Chris Carbert "received a text message...and was told to share a message with non-mainstream media and on social media." Checkley also told Lethbridge provincial court that "The message and a related followup text...stated the protest was not just about ending vaccine and public health mandates but altering Canada's political, justice and medical systems, including the elimination of a group of people referred to as the professional political class," and that someone whose name was redacted "also shared the above message...in a group text chat with Carbert, Lysak and Olienick.”

Court documents released in December 2022 indicated that police believe the four accused were being directed by remote leadership.

All four accused were denied bail. Lawyers for the accused, in June 2023, requested a relocation of the trial location away from Lethbridge, and an adjournment.

A new pre-trial hearing date for the accused was set for December 11, 2023, but on the first day, before hearings could be completed, Olienick parted ways with his lawyer, and a new date was set for February 2024. As of February new legal counsel for the Chris Lysak arranged a plea deal where the Crown accepted his plea of not guilty in exchange for a plea of guilty to improper storage of a firearm for which he paid a modest fine.

In September 2024, a jury found Olienick and Carbert not guilty on the charge of conspiring to kill RCMP officers.

== Public reaction ==
A convoy of 235 vehicles drove from Lethbridge to the Coutts border crossing on January 30, 2023 as part of a wider campaign of support for the four accused.
