= Diagolon =

Canadian alt-right organization

- Founding leader: Jeremy MacKenzie
- Founded: 2020
- Country: Canada
- Ideology: Alt-right; White nationalism
- Political position: Far-right
- Website: diagolon.org (2022 archive)

Diagolon is a Canadian alt-right organization, conceived by podcaster Jeremy MacKenzie. The US Department of State's Bureau of Counterterrorism has called it a far-right extremist group. It was mentioned in news coverage of the Canada convoy protest.

== Organisation and aims ==
Diagolon is a right-wing and alt-right militia network with chapters throughout Canada. A House of Commons of Canada report called it a "violent extremist organisation." According to the Canadian Anti-Hate Network, the "neo-fascist militia" believes that "a violent revolution is coming," and is an "accelerationist movement that believes a revolution is inevitable and necessary to collapse the current government system".

Diagolon associate Alex Vriend has promoted the neo-Nazi propaganda film Europa: The Last Battle in chatrooms. Barbara Perry, director of Ontario Tech University's Centre on Hate, Bias and Extremism, described Diagolon's ambition to create a "white ethnonationalist state" as irony poisoning to normalise hateful rhetoric through humour. The group's motto is "gun or rope".

== History ==
The group emerged from the Plaid Army, a group of Canadian internet live streamers and internet trolls known for their far-right, racist, and antisemitic politics, according to the Canadian Anti-Hate Network. The Ontario Provincial Police reported connections between the Plaid Army and the "Patriot Movement" who are known for their "opposition of provincial and federal government responses to the COVID-19 public health crisis.” Members include right-wing video bloggers Jeremy MacKenzie and Derek Harrison, the former of which would go on to found and oversee Diagolon.

The group's flag was seen at the Canada convoy protest in Ottawa, as people connected to both Diagolon and the Plaid Army were present at the public disturbances. One piece of body armour seized along with weapons and ammunition at the property of a murder conspiracy suspect during the protest blockade of the Sweetgrass–Coutts Border Crossing reportedly had a Diagolon patch. In February 2023, judge Paul Rouleau described Diagolon's presence at both the Ottawa and Coutts protests as "the most troubling connection between protest locations" in his report following the Public Order Emergency Commission into the use of the Emergencies Act.

In 2022, Pierre Poilievre called Diagolon members "losers" and "dirtbags" after they suggested raping Anaida Poilievre, his wife, on a podcast. Poilievre had previously been photographed shaking hands with Jeremy MacKenzie at a Conservative leadership campaign event in Nova Scotia. Poilievre stated "My office has referred these comments to the RCMP to assess whether criminal charges should be laid." Public Safety Minister Marco Mendicino stated that the Royal Canadian Mounted Police were "reviewing" the rape statement.

In 2024, Poilievre met with anti-carbon tax protesters on the Nova Scotia–New Brunswick border, where he was videoed leaving an RV with a drawing of the Diagolon flag on the RV door. Poilievre stated the protest was "a good, old-fashioned Canadian tax revolt"; his spokesperson stated they noticed an anti-carbon tax protest driving between stops in Atlantic Canada, and "made a brief, impromptu stop".
