= New Middleton, Ohio =

Unincorporated community in Ohio, U.S.

Coordinates: 40°51′52″N 80°54′54″W

New Middleton is an unincorporated community in Columbiana County, in the U.S. state of Ohio.

== History ==
New Middleton was platted before 1825.
