= Jeremy MacKenzie (activist) =

Canadian far-right activist)

- Born: 1985 or 1986 (age 40–41)
- Occupations: Podcaster, military veteran
- Organization(s): Diagolon, Plaid Army, Second Sons (group)
- Known for: Far-right politics, protesting, founding Diagolon and Second Sons
- Military career
- Branch: Canadian Army
- Service years: 2003 - 2017
- Rank: Master corporal
- Unit: Royal Canadian Regiment
- Conflicts: War in Afghanistan (2001–2021)

Jeremy Mitchell MacKenzie (born 1985 or 1986) is a Canadian far-right activist, military veteran, Plaid Army podcaster, the founder of the alt-right groups Diagolon and Second Sons, as well as a Canada convoy protester.

== Interests and views ==
Jeremy Mitchell MacKenzie is a right-wing activist who created the alt-right group Diagolon, which the House of Commons of Canada reported as a "violent extremist group". He is a firearms enthusiast and a Plaid Army podcaster.

MacKenzie has stated that there is a race war occurring in the US, that the Nazis were right, and described the Nuremberg Trials as a kangaroo court.

== Career ==
MacKenzie joined the Canadian Armed Forces in 2003 and worked as infantryman for the Royal Canadian Regiment, which included a deployment in Afghanistan. He left the army in 2017 with the rank of master corporal.

MacKenzie is present on many social media platforms where he uses variations of the username Raging Dissident.

== Canada convoy protest ==
In early 2022, MacKenzie took part in the Canada convoy protest. In February 2022, he was identified by Public Safety Minister Marco Mendicino as a national security risk; Mendicino also identified MacKenzie's Diagolon organization as "a far right extreme organization." MacKenzie and his lawyer, Sherif Foda, said the official description relied too heavily on what they described as misinformation from the Canadian Anti-Hate Network.

While giving evidence at the subsequent Public Order Emergency Commission, MacKenzie downplayed his connections to Chris Lysak, one of the men accused of plotting to kill police officers at the 2022 highway blockage near Coutts, Alberta. MacKenzie's lawyer had requested that MacKenzie be allowed to testify in private. Commissioner Paul Rouleau rejected evidence presented by MacKenzie that downplayed the role of Diagolon at the protest and described Diagolon's presence at both the Ottawa and Coutts protests as "the most troubling connection between protest locations" in his concluding report.

== Allegations and arrest ==
In January 2022, MacKenzie was charged with 13 firearms-related offences.

The Royal Canadian Mounted Police (RCMP) issued a Canada-wide arrest warrant for MacKenzie in July 2022, and he was arrested on September 29, 2022 in Cole Harbour, Nova Scotia. MacKenzie was charged with crimes in three provinces, including Saskatchewan and Nova Scotia. His charges include: criminal harassment, uttering threats, assault, pointing a firearm at someone, and ten counts of possessing restricted firearms and prohibited magazines. He was denied bail on October 7, 2022. MacKenzie fired his lawyer on October 13, 2022. After being held in Saskatoon Provincial Correctional Centre, bail was set at $10,000, on November 25, 2022.

On May 31, 2023 MacKenzie did not enter a plea to harassing Nova Scotia's chief medical officer, Robert Strang, as the court case was delayed to enable more evidence to be disclosed. In late August 2023, all Saskatchewan-related charges against MacKenzie were dropped. MacKenzie was given a 12-month peace bond, preventing him from naming complainants in the matter. Some Nova Scotia charges were also dropped, although in late August 2023, charges relating to events in Quebec and Nova Scotia remained untested in court. On June 7, 2024 provincial court Judge Jill Hartlen dismissed the harassment charges against MacKenzie and his wife Morgan Guptill, ruling that "the time between arrest and trial violates the 18-month ceiling set by the Supreme Court of Canada".

MacKenzie made racist comments and discussed raping Anaida Poilievre (wife of Conservative Party leader Pierre Poilievre) with podcast guest Alex Vriend, prompting Poilievre to ask the RCMP to investigate. An RCMP investigation was ongoing as of October 2022.

In June 2024, sasktoday.ca reported that charges in all provinces against MacKenzie had been stayed or withdrawn.

== Second Sons ==
In 2024, MacKenzie founded Second Sons, a group that describes itself as a "men's nationalist club". Second Sons says its members engage in political activism and fitness training. In July 2026, Second Sons held its second annual national meeting in a rural community hall south of Calgary, where attendees wore masks and participated in military-style drills. The community association that runs the hall said the group did not identify themselves when they booked it. Local residents were concerned to hear of the group's presence.
