= Filip Brusselmans =

Flemish politician

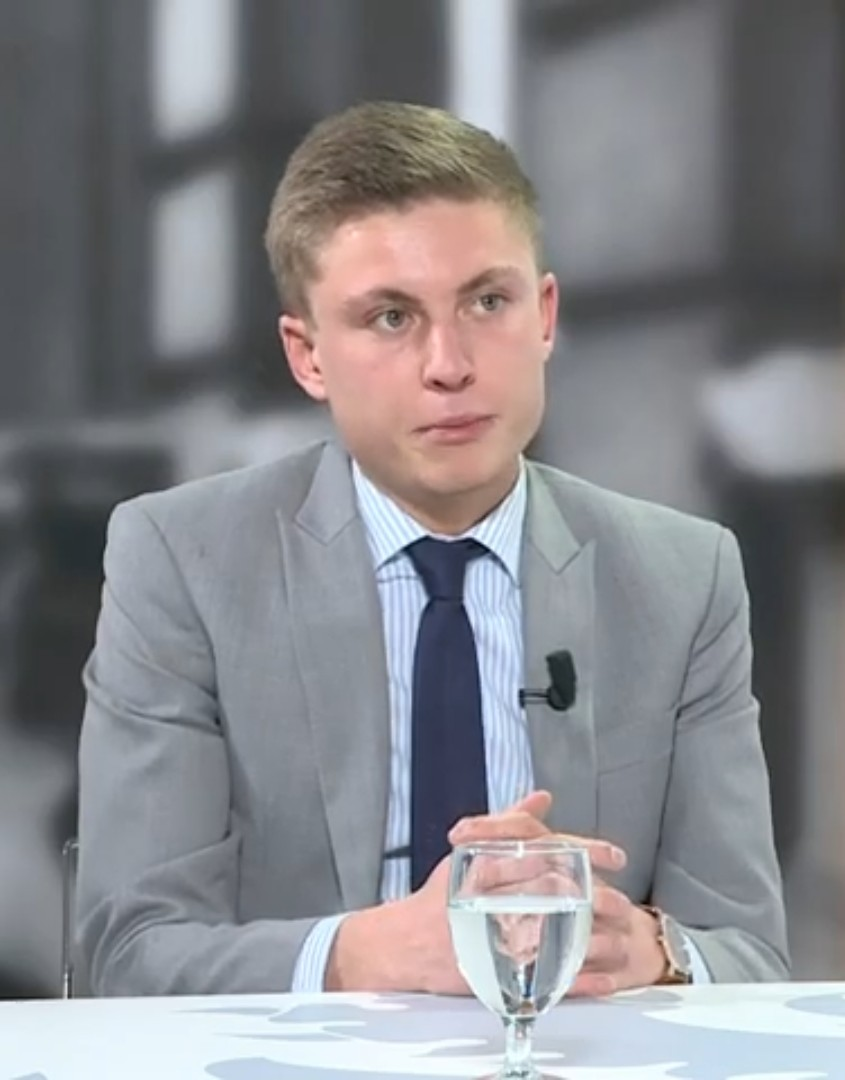
- Brusselmans (2019)

Member of the Flemish Parliament
- Incumbent
- Assumed office 2019

Personal details
- Born: 30 October 1997 (age 28) Sint-Niklaas, Belgium
- Party: Vlaams Belang
- Education: University of Antwerp

Filip Brusselmans (born 30 October 1997) is a Belgian politician and political activist.

== Early life ==
Brusselmans was born in Sint-Niklaas. He studied political science at the University of Antwerp where he became active in the Katholiek Vlaams Hoogstudentenverbond.

== Career ==
Since 2019, Brusselmans has been a member of the Flemish Parliament for Vlaams Belang and is currently the youngest representative to serve in the Flemish Parliament. He was elected as chairman of the VB's youth wing Vlaams Belang Jongeren in 2020.

In January 2018, Brusselmans made headlines and caused some controversy when he criticized the media attention given to the gender reassignment of transgender Belgian television presenter Bo Van Spilbeeck, which he described as a "surrender to the absurd". In December 2018, Brusselmans and Dries Van Langenhove helped to organize the March against Marrakesh along with several Flemish nationalist groups such as Vlaams Belang Jongeren, Voorpost and the Nationalistische Studentenvereniging which protested Belgium's decision to adopt the UN Global Compact on Migration.

In 2020, Brusselmans received death threats and was given police protection.

Brusselmans was interviewed by the 2024 uncovered Russian influence network "Voice of Europe".
