= Hans Verreyt =

Belgian politician

Member of the Chamber of Representatives
- Incumbent
- Assumed office 2019

Chairman of Vlaams Belang Jongeren
- In office 2004–2004

Personal details
- Born: 23 July 1980 (age 45) Antwerp, Belgium
- Political party: Vlaams Belang

Hans Beatrijs Herman Verreyt (born 3 July 1980) is a Belgian politician and an MP in the Chamber of Representatives for Vlaams Belang.

Verreyt worked as a web designer before entering politics. He was active in the NJSV and the NSV as a teenager and chaired the Antwerp section of the NSV. In 2004, he was elected national chairman of the Vlaams Blok Jongeren (VBJ), the youth wing of the former Vlaams Blok party and subsequently became head of the Vlaams Belang Jongeren when Vlaams Blok was relaunched as Vlaams Belang. He held the post until 2009 after which Barbara Pas succeeded him. During the 2019 Belgian federal election, Verreyt was elected to the Chamber of Representatives for the Antwerp constituency. He has also been a municipal councilor in Boom since 2006.
