= Katholiek Vlaams Hoogstudentenverbond =

Flemish Catholic political student society

KVHV Katholiek Vlaams Hoogstudentenverbond
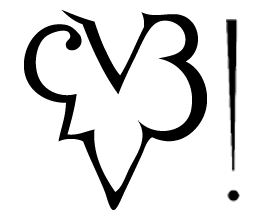
- Founded: 1902 (124 years ago)
- Ideology: Catholicism; Flemish nationalism; National conservatism
- Colours: Black, yellow, and blue (Leuven); Orange, white, and blue (Antwerp); Black, yellow, and white (Ghent)

Katholiek Vlaams Hoogstudentenverbond (KVHV) (lit. 'Catholic Flemish High Student Union') is a Catholic Flemish nationalist student society which has chapters in Ghent, Leuven, Antwerp, Brussels, Aalst and Sint-Katelijne-Waver. Previously, KVHV also had chapters in Kortrijk, Ostend, and Mechelen.

== History ==
In Belgium, in the 19th and the beginning of the 20th century, the dominant language for education, literature and politics was French as this was the language of the elites at the time. The majority of the people in Flanders, the northern part of the country, spoke Dutch. The northern part was financially helped by the southern to develop. In the second half of the 19th century, a movement started that sought to elevate the status of Dutch in society and emancipate the Flemish people. At the two universities in Flanders (the Catholic University of Leuven and the State University of Ghent), Flemish students started to organize themselves in societies. The name KVHV was first used by Flemish students in 1911, when the Vlaams Verbond (Flemish Union) was banned by the Catholic University of Leuven. The name was permanently adopted in 1923. At the same time the dominant Flemish society in Ghent, Rodenbach's Vrienden, also changed its name to KVHV.

In 1976, there was a schism in Antwerp in which a faction broke off to form the Nationalistische Studentenvereniging (transl. Nationalist Student Association).

== Organisation ==
The KVHV has four general principles:

- Catholic: The KVHV is a Roman Catholic organisation. Members have a conservative ideology.
- Flemish: the KVHV is the dominant Flemish nationalist student society together with the NSV.
- Student society: The KVHV is the publisher of the Studentencodex, a book containing songs and the rules and traditions of Flemish student societies. The KVHV itself is organised according to these rules. The most visible expression of this is the ribbon and cap worn by all members in the colors of the society.
- 'Levensbond' or bond for life: The membership of the KVHV not only consists of students, but also all alumni.

All members have to strictly follow these rules and principles.

The KVHV also has its own official newspapers. These include "Ons Verbond" of Ghent, "Ons leven" of Leuven and "Tegenstroom" of Antwerp, whose former editors include Bart De Wever and Gerolf Annemans.

== Notable members ==
- Gerolf Annemans (MP, MEP and former Vlaams Belang leader)
- Wouter Beke (former leader of the CD&V)
- Filip Brusselmans (politician chairman of Vlaams Belang Jongeren)
- Bart Claes (Vlaams Belang politician)
- Alexandra Colen (former MP for Vlaams Belang and Vlaams Blok)
- Bart De Wever (chairman of the N-VA and mayor of Antwerp)
- Jaak Gabriels (politician for the Open VLD and Volksunie)
- Dries Van Langenhove (blogger and political activist)
- Ludo Martens (founder of the Workers' Party of Belgium)
- Barbara Pas (MP for Vlaams Belang)
- Tom Vandendriessche (MEP for Vlaams Belang)

== Literature ==
- de Goeyse Mon, O Vrij-Studentenheerlijkheid, Leuvense Universitaire Pers, Leuven, 1987, ISBN 90-6186-251-5
- Uytterhoeven R., Nostalgia Lovaniensis, Universitaire Pers Leuven, Leuven, 2000, ISBN 9058670651
- Vos Louis, Weets Wilfried, (Ed.), Vlaamse vaandels, rode petten, Uitgeverij Pelckmans, Kapellen, 2002, ISBN 9028932046
- Huys, Jan, Van de Weyer Stefan, De studentikoze erfenis van Rodenbach, Acco Drukkerij, Leuven, 2006
- Henkens, Bregt, De Vereniging van Vlaamse Studenen 1974-1983
- Vandezande, Matthias, Rechts-radicalisme tussen Noordzee en Leiestreek
- Staeren, Frank, De Vlaamse Studententradities (1875–1960). Herkomst-Ontstaan-Ontwikkeling, Onuitgegeven Licentiaatsverhandeling K.U.Leuven, 1994.

== See also ==
- Nationalistische Studentenvereniging ("Nationalist Student Association"): a Flemish nationalist student political and youth organization.
