= Remigration Summit =

Far-right political conference in Europe

- Status: Active
- Frequency: Annual
- Locations: Varied: Milan, Italy (2025); Figueira da Foz, Portugal (2026)
- Inaugurated: May 2025
- Most recent: May 30, 2026
- Next event: 2027
- Attendance: around 400 (2025); 500 to 600 (2026)
- Website: remigrationsummit.com

Remigration Summit is an annual far-right political conference dedicated to remigration. The first conference was held in Gallarate, near Milan in May 2025.

== History ==
=== 2025 ===
Remigration Summit 2025 was hosted in Gallarate, near Milan, Italy in May 2025 by members of the Identitarian Movement. The summit was attended by approximately 400.

Speakers included Lega MEP Roberto Vannacci.

=== 2026 ===
Martin Sellner, Dries Van Langenhove and Afonso Gonçalves at the 2025 Remigration Summit

==== Venue ====
Remigration Summer 2026 was held on May 30, 2026 at the Quinta da Salmanha venue in Figueira da Foz, Portugal, and was organized by Austrian far-right activist Martin Sellner. The event was attended by approximately 500 to 600, including members of far-right European political parties and activists from Canada, the United States, and Europe.

==== Speakers ====
Gregory Bovino, an American former commander-at-large of the US Border Patrol, and American white nationalist Jared Taylor attended as "VIP Guests", according to Politico Europe. In an interview ahead of the summit, Bovino referenced Erwin Rommel, Nazi Germany's lead general, as an inspirational figure. In a speech at the summit, Bovino criticized members of the Trump Administration for "watering down" its immigration strategy, including Homeland Security Secretary Markwayne Mullin and senior Trump aide Susie Wiles.

German federal police barred far-right activist Maximilian Märkl from attending the summit.

Other speakers included Daniel Tyrie, a Canadian political activist who is the founder and current chairman of the Dominion Society of Canada.
