= Filip Dewinter =

Belgian politician

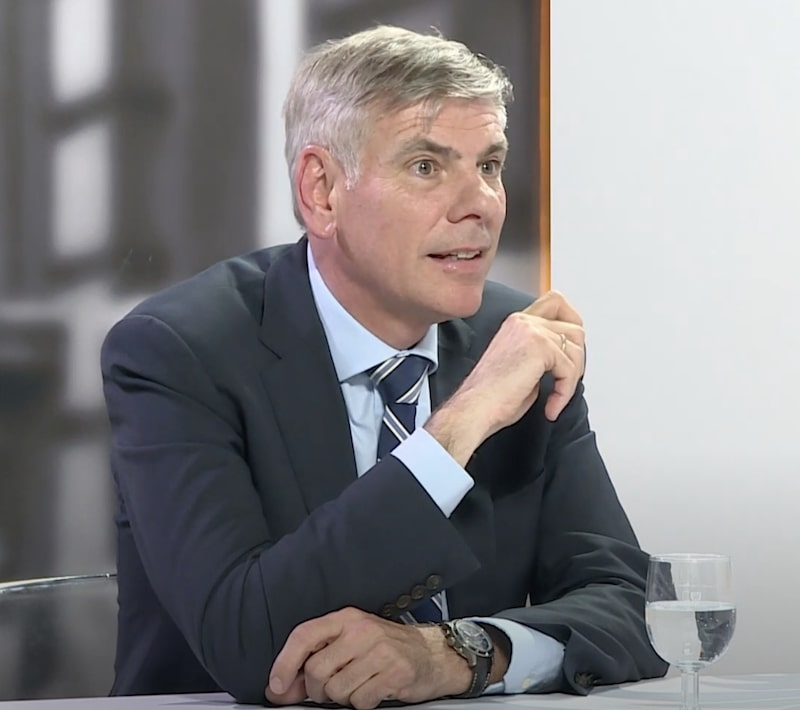
- Dewinter in 2019

Preses NSV Antwerp
- In office 1983–1985

Member of the Antwerp Provincial Council
- In office 1985–1987

Member of the Chamber of Representatives
- In office 1987–1995

Chairman Vlaams Blok Jongeren
- In office 1987–1989

Parliamentary leader at the Council of Flanders
- In office 1992–1995

Antwerp City Council Member
- In office 1995–Present

Senator
- In office 2010–2014

Vice Chair of the Flemish Parliament
- In office 2012–2014

Member of the Chamber of Representatives
- In office 2014–2019

Member of the Flemish Parliament
- In office 2019–Present

First Vice Chair of the Flemish Parliament
- In office 2019–2024

Secretary of the Flemish Parliament
- In office 2024–Present

Personal details
- Born: Philip Michel Frans Dewinter; 11 September 1962 (age 64) Bruges, Belgium
- Citizenship: Belgium
- Party: Vlaams Belang (2004–present); National Council of European Resistance (2017–present)
- Other political affiliations: VVP (1978–1983); Vlaams Blok (1983–2004)
- Spouse: Lutgarde Verboven
- Children: 3
- Occupation: Politician
- Website: www.filipdewinter.be

Philip Michel Frans "Filip" Dewinter (born 11 September 1962) is a Belgian politician, journalist and commentator. He is one of the leading members of Vlaams Belang, a right-wing Flemish nationalist and secessionist political party.

== Family background and education ==
Filip Dewinter was born on 11 September 1962 in Bruges, the only child of Roger Dewinter and his wife, Micheline Mengé. His father, Roger Dewinter, studied medicine at the Catholic University of Leuven when the university was closed by the German occupying forces during the Second World War. Fearing that he would be forced to perform compulsory labour in Nazi Germany, he went into hiding but was soon arrested. After spending several weeks imprisoned in the Pandreitje prison in Bruges, he was deported and forced to work as a labourer in a Messerschmitt munitions factory in Hamburg. Unable to resume his studies afterwards, he joined the Belgian National Railway Company (NMBS) after the war, where he became stationmaster of Zeebrugge. According to Filip Dewinter, his maternal grandfather, Frans Mengé, was a police officer in Blankenberge who was active as a resistance fighter with the White Brigade in the coastal region during the Second World War.

During his school years at the Sint-Franciscus-Xaverius Institute in Bruges, Filip Dewinter developed an interest in the Flemish movement and became politically active. In 1978, at the age of sixteen, he founded the Flemish Students' Action Group (Vlaamse Scholieren Actie Groep) there. In 1979, together with his childhood friend Frank Vanhecke, he renamed the organisation the Nationalist Student Union (Nationalistisch JongStudentenVerbond, NJSV). In 1978, he also briefly became a member of the Flemish People's Party (Vlaamse Volkspartij, VVP), which became part of Vlaams Blok in 1979. In addition, he was a member of the Bruges branch of the Catholic Students' Association (KSA), Parsival, and the Royal Bruges Rowing and Watersports Club. In September 1982, he moved to Antwerp to study political and social sciences at the University Faculties Saint-Ignatius Antwerp. There, he joined the Antwerp branch of the Nationalist Student Association (NSV), serving as its president from 1983 to 1985.

In 1983, he left the university without obtaining a degree and went on to study journalism for two years at the NUHO Erasmushandelsschool. After completing his studies, he worked as a journalist for the newspaper De Nieuwe Gids from 1984 to 1985, writing for its Antwerp edition, which was part of Het Volk.

== Political career ==
In 1981, at the request of party chairman Karel Dillen, he joined the Vlaams Blok. In October 1985, Dewinter was elected to the Provincial Council of Antwerp on behalf of the party. He became parliamentary group leader and remained a member of the Provincial Council until December 1987. From 1987 to 1990, he served as the first chairman of Vlaams Blok Jongeren (Vlaams Blok Youth). He was also responsible for organisational development and the expansion of the Vlaams Blok's party structures. From 1987 to 2004, he served as secretary of the Nationalistisch Vormingsinstituut (Nationalist Training Institute) and as an editorial board member of the Vlaams Blok Kaderblad.

In December 1987, he was elected to the Belgian Chamber of Representatives for the Antwerp constituency, where he served until May 1995. As a result, from 1988 to 1995 he was also automatically a member of the Flemish Council, where he became Vlaams Blok parliamentary group leader in 1992. Following the 1995 elections, he moved to the Flemish Parliament. He remained a member until May 2014 and served as parliamentary group leader for Vlaams Blok/Vlaams Belang from June 1995 to April 2012. In the Flemish Parliament, he became a member of the committees on Internal Affairs, Urban Renewal and Housing. From April 2012 to May 2014, he served as Vice Chair of the Flemish Parliament.

Under his influence, the Vlaams Blok began to focus more prominently on immigration-related issues. Dewinter drew inspiration from the emerging Front National of Jean-Marie Le Pen in France. He advocated a hard-line approach to crime, restricting immigration and imposing stricter requirements regarding integration. His positions have been described by political observers as right-wing populist or even racist. Together with Gerolf Annemans, Dewinter authored the notorious 70-point plan, published in the early 1990s. This policy document consisted of 70 articles and included anti-Islamic proposals, such as withdrawing official recognition of Islam as a religion and drastically reducing the number of mosques, as well as concrete proposals to organise the return of Turkish and Moroccan migrants. He also became a proponent of the Great Replacement theory, a conspiracy theory claiming that immigration is deliberately orchestrated to displace Europe's white population.

In October 1988, the Vlaams Blok made a major electoral breakthrough in the city of Antwerp, where the party secured almost 18% of the vote. In 1994, Dewinter moved from Brasschaat to Ekeren to lead the Antwerp Vlaams Blok list in that October's municipal elections. Under his leadership, the party increased its share of the vote to 28%, becoming the largest party, while Dewinter became the city's most popular politician with 42,000 preference votes. Due to the cordon sanitaire, participation in the governing coalition was impossible, and in early January 1995 he became parliamentary group leader in the municipal council.

In October 2000, the party increased its share of the vote to almost 33%, remaining the largest party in the city of Antwerp. Six years later, in October 2006, Vlaams Belang gained a further half percentage point, but Dewinter suffered what was described as a Pyrrhic victory: the Socialists, led by Mayor Patrick Janssens, achieved a better result with 35% of the vote. From that point onwards, Vlaams Belang's electoral fortunes in Antwerp began to decline, with its support subsequently fluctuating around 10%. On 5 January 2020, he handed over his position as Vlaams Belang parliamentary group leader in the Antwerp municipal council to his political protégé, Sam van Rooy. Nevertheless, Dewinter remained the party's leading figure in Antwerp. In the October 2024 municipal elections, he once again headed the Vlaams Belang electoral list.

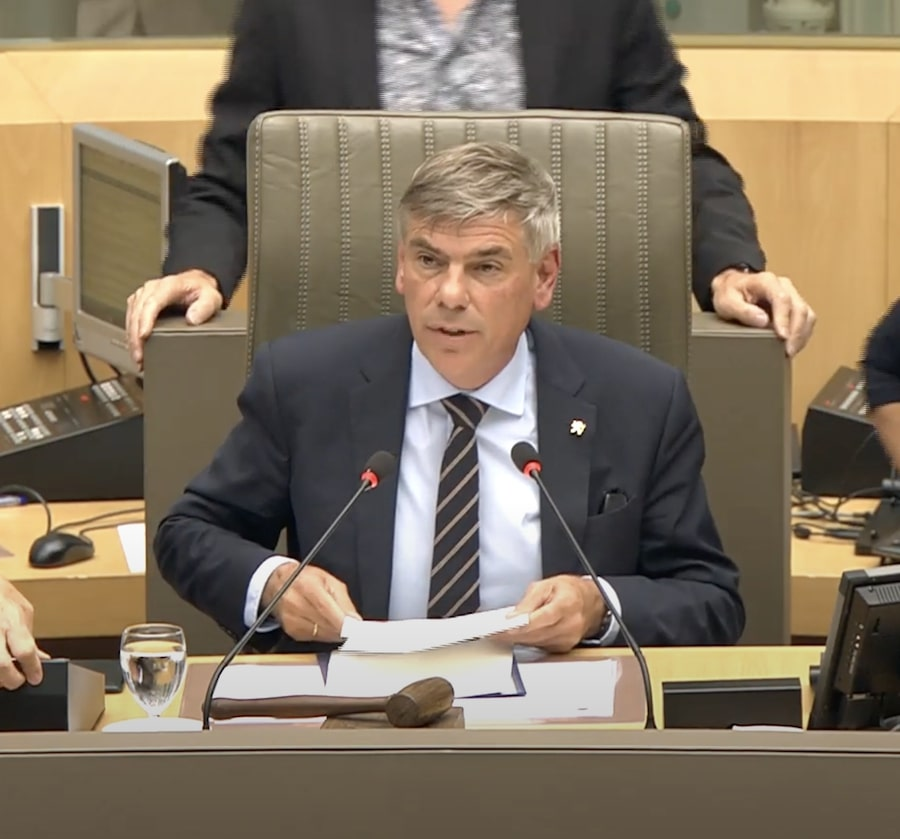
Dewinter as Speaker of the Flemish Parliament

In the May 2014 elections, Dewinter stood on the Antwerp Vlaams Belang list for the federal parliamentary elections and was once again elected to the Chamber of Representatives, where he served until May 2019. In the May 2019 Flemish elections, Dewinter led the Antwerp Vlaams Belang list for the Flemish Parliament. He was elected with 93,751 preference votes, giving him the second-highest number of preference votes, behind N-VA list leader Bart De Wever.

Following these elections, he became First Vice Chair of the Flemish Parliament. On 11 July 2019, following the resignation of Speaker Kris Van Dijck (N-VA), Dewinter became de facto Speaker of the Flemish Parliament in his capacity as First Vice Chair. Two days later, the Flemish Parliament was exceptionally convened to elect a successor. Wilfried Vandaele (N-VA), the sole candidate, was elected. Nevertheless, during the legislative term, Dewinter repeatedly served as acting Speaker in his role as First Vice Chair. He held this position until 2024.

In 2024, he relinquished his position as lead candidate for the Flemish elections to Tom Van Grieken. Dewinter instead became the lijstduwer (the final candidate on the electoral list, typically a prominent figure who lends support to the list). With a personal total of 11,974 preference votes, Dewinter was re-elected to the Flemish Parliament, after which he presided over the assembly's inaugural session as its longest-serving member. In the permanent bureau subsequently established, Dewinter was appointed secretary.

== Political views ==
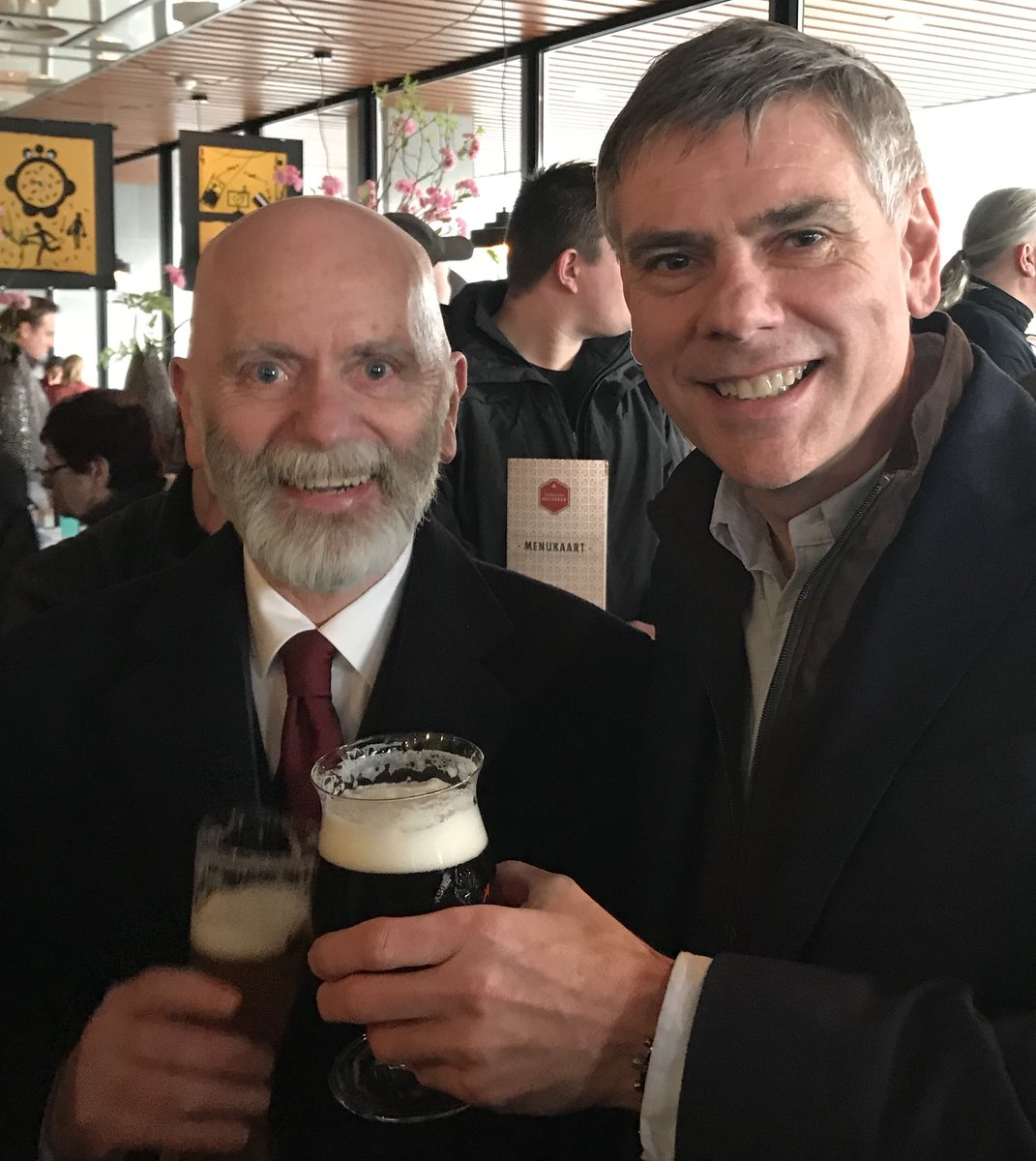
Renaud Camus and Filip Dewinter

Dewinter is an opponent of what he calls "political Islam". According to him, he does not target Muslims, but rather Islam as an ideology. In his Resistance Guide Against Islam, he advocated removing 164 jihadist verses from the Quran in order to make a European form of Islam possible.

In March 1990, he expressed his support in an opinion piece published in the newspaper Le Soir for the recently elected French nationalist Member of the European Parliament, and convicted xenophobe and Holocaust denier, Jean-Marie Le Pen, whom he described as the victim of a hate campaign. In 2010, he participated in a conference organised by Likud in Israel on the fight against terrorism.

== Controversies ==
=== Ties to Ba'athist Syria ===
In March 2015, Filip Dewinter sparked controversy by making a two-day visit to Syria and meeting President Bashar al-Assad, together with fellow party members Jan Penris and Anke Van dermeersch. The visit was controversial because the Syrian leader is widely regarded in Western Europe as an alleged dictator and war criminal, held responsible for the use of chemical weapons and barrel bombs against his own civilian population. The fact that the trip and private meeting with Bashar al-Assad took place without permission and even without the knowledge of party chairman Tom Van Grieken also angered many Vlaams Belang members.

According to Dewinter, the purpose of the meeting was to express his support for what he described as Assad's harsh but courageous actions as an "ally" in the "free" West's fight against the extremist and "Salafist Islamic terrorism" of Islamic State (IS).

At the invitation and expense of the Syrian regime, Dewinter visited Syria again two years later, in 2017. This time, the visit had Van Grieken's approval and was accompanied by a group of accredited journalists from VRT, Knack and Sudpresse. In addition to a meeting with Bashar al-Assad and a press conference at the parliament in Damascus, the trip, like an earlier visit in June 2013, was intended as a "fact-finding mission". Its purpose was to gather "objective information" about, among other things, the warfare in Aleppo, a nearby refugee camp and a military hospital.

=== Ties to Russia ===
Dewinter travelled to Russia in 2014 to meet with Deputy Prime Minister Dmitry Rogozin. Following the conquest and annexation of Crimea, he made a trip to Russia in 2015, paid for by the Russians, to speak at a conference of the State Duma, where he urged Europe to side with Russia. He concluded his speech with a quotation from Vladimir Putin about the importance of unity in the fight against terrorism and posed for a photograph with State Duma Chairman Sergey Naryshkin.

Dewinter regularly appeared in Russian media and endorsed Putin's Eurasianist policy of creating an "independent" Europe stretching from Vladivostok to the North Sea. When the Russian military build-up heightened tensions in early 2022, he condemned what he called the "anti-Putin and anti-Russia smear campaign".

However, one month after the beginning of Russia's war of aggression against Ukraine, he admitted that he had been mistaken about Putin, while opposing arms deliveries and severe sanctions.

=== Ties to China ===
In February 2019, the Brussels Public Prosecutor's Office decided not to prosecute Dewinter over his ties to a Belgian non-profit organisation (VZW) suspected of conducting espionage activities on behalf of the Chinese government. Dewinter had worked for the organisation as a political adviser and networker, receiving expense reimbursements. The organisation had previously been accused of espionage by the Belgian State Security Service. Dewinter denied having any knowledge of the organisation's alleged espionage activities, but acknowledged that he may have been too careless in the work he carried out for it.

In December 2023, a report by the security services revealed that during the COVID-19 pandemic in 2020, Dewinter had allegedly arranged the delivery of 10,000 face masks through his contacts with Chinese spy Changchun Shao. The masks were distributed free of charge by the Antwerp branch of Vlaams Belang. Following a complaint by Groen parliamentary group leader Mieke Schauvliege, the case was examined by the Deontological Committee of the Flemish Parliament, which requested additional information from the State Security Service pending further consideration. After receiving this information, the committee ruled that the complaint against Dewinter was inadmissible due to the absence of concrete facts and a formal case file. The information available from the State Security Service was considered insufficient to justify further action. However, an investigation by Humo and Apache in April 2024 reported that Dewinter had indeed been in direct contact with Changchun Shao regarding the delivery of the face masks. Shao, as the founder of the Preparatory Committee of the International Medical Pilot Zone in Fangchenggang, had played a crucial role in arranging the delivery. Dewinter maintains that he did nothing illegal and argues that the alleged revelations were intended solely to damage his reputation ahead of the Belgian federal elections of 9 June 2024.

According to documents published by Humo and Apache in March 2024, Dewinter had knowingly allowed himself to be used politically by the Chinese Communist Party to promote China's interests through political influence. For example, an expense report from 2016 showed that several dinners with European far-right politicians had been reimbursed by Windows of Beijing in Europe, a Belgian non-profit organisation founded by Chinese spy Changchun Chao. The dinners were intended to prepare for a visit by a delegation from the China Association for International Friendly Contact, which experts describe as a Chinese intelligence agency.

Dewinter maintains that he was never a political adviser and that he was, at most, somewhat naive. He claims that his contacts with the organisation were always related to culture rather than politics. He also emphasises that the Western perception of China was different at the time and that he only discovered Shao was a Chinese spy in late 2017, following his expulsion from Belgium.

=== Waffen SS-Meeting ===
Filip Dewinter was the guest speaker for a gathering of the former SS-collaborators of Sint-Maartensfonds which took place on 1 December 2001. That evening, Filip Dewinter opened his speech with the words "My Honour is loyalty" which was the official motto of the German SS-soldiers during WWII.

Dewinter has also been interviewed by the Israeli paper Haaretz. About the collaboration of Flemish nationalists during WWII he had to say:

Many Flemish nationalists collaborated during the war because they thought—and now it is clear that they were wrong—that this would help them achieve independence for Flanders. This is the whole story. The overwhelming majority were not Nazis. They collaborated in order to attain independence and because the Church called upon them to go out and fight the Communists—something that Western Europe continued to do for 50 years. Now, in 2005, it is easy to say: 'The collaboration was a mistake.' The collaboration did not help our country at all; we just became a vassal state of Germany. At the time, it was logical, because of the Church, because of communism. But this has no connection with Nazism.

About the attendance of party members to ceremonies marking the death of Staf De Clercq he responded:

He is one of the historic leaders of the party. This is part of the history of the Flemish nationalist movement and it is impossible to deny this. We are the descendants of this movement. Some of the members of the party attend these events because they want to honor the heritage of the Flemish movement. This does not mean that they agree with Nazism. Not at all. I understand that this is hard to understand as a Jew. I respect very much that Jews have a problem with this. But Jews must also understand that this is not as simple as it seems. Not all of the [Nazi] collaborators wanted to kill the Jews in Europe. Most of the collaborators had other motives. I think that if they were living today, most of them would be ashamed of what happened to the Jews. The only thing I can do today is to say that I respect very much the suffering of the Jewish people, to express my sympathy and condolences about what happened and to try to move far away from this. But the Jewish people must understand that not every collaborator was necessarily anti-Semitic.

=== Judaism and Islam ===
A December 2005 interview by Dewinter with the American Jewish newsweekly The Jewish Week included a question if "Jews should vote for a party that espouses xenophobia". Dewinter responded by saying: "Xenophobia is not the word I would use. If it absolutely must be a 'phobia,' let it be 'Islamophobia.'"

In 2007 Dewinter took part in hosting the international counter-jihad conference in Brussels in the European and Flemish Parliaments.

=== Golden Dawn ===
In November 2016, Dewinter gave a speech at an event organized by the Greek far-right party Golden Dawn, which earned him a reprimand from the party leadership.

== Assassination plot and death threats ==
In February 2014, former Belgian paracommando Tomas Boutens was sentenced to five years in prison for plotting an assassination attempt against Filip Dewinter as a founding member of the neo-Nazi organisation Bloed, Bodem, Eer en Trouw (Blood, Soil, Honour and Loyalty), the Flemish splinter group of the international Blood & Honour movement. The plan involved shooting Dewinter with a Kalashnikov and making it appear as though the assassination had been carried out by Islamist terrorists. The aim was to destabilise the Belgian state by carrying out attacks on, among others, Dewinter, Dyab Abou Jahjah and the National Bank of Belgium. Inspired by a prophetic vision of a Clash of Civilizations, the plotters intended to provoke a civil war and ultimately establish a white, racist regime.

As Dewinter has received death threats and other threats for many years, and the police protection provided to him (patrols outside his residence) and protection by bodyguards have not always been considered sufficient, he was granted a firearms licence and a permit to carry a weapon in 2018. Dewinter is one of fifteen civilians who have received special authorisation from the provincial governor, following, among other things, a favourable recommendation from the King's Prosecutor, to carry a firearm in public spaces. In his case, this is a 9 mm Glock pistol.

== Quotes ==
- "Vlaams Blok says: Our own people first!! And yes, Vlaams Blok chooses a Flemish Flanders. And yes, Vlaams Blok chooses a white Europe!" (Vlaams Blok-meeting, 1991).
- "He who sows the Koran reaps the jihad".
- "[Immigrants] turn themselves into self pity. They become hostile, they cause nuisance and show criminal behaviour. In Flanders the multicultural society led to a multicriminal society."
- "Staf de Clercq is one of the historical leaders of the Flemish national movement. Our party, the Vlaams Belang, is the continuator of this movement. We may not deny this past. Although I realise that it might be difficult for Jewish readers to understand, most collaborators thought that they could realise an independent Flanders by cooperating with the Germans. Most of them are ashamed of the horror they caused. The only thing I can do today is to show understanding for the suffering of the Jewish people."

== Bibliography ==
- Eigen volk eerst, TYR Publishing, 1989.
- Weg met ons? – Antwoord aan Paula D'Hondt, TYR Publishing, 1991.
- Een tegen allen – Opkomst van het Vlaams Blok, TYR Publishing, 1993.
- Immigratie: de tijdbom tikt, TYR Publishing, 1996.
- Baas in eigen land – Over identiteit, culturele eigenheid en nationaliteit, Egmont Publishing, 2000.
- Zerotolerantie tegen criminaliteit – Over de aanpak van de misdaad, Egmont Publishing, 2003.
- Antwerpen troef!, Egmont Publishing, 2006.
- Zeggen wat u denkt!, Egmont Publishing, 2007.
- Inch Allah? De islamisering van Europa!, Egmont Publishing, 2008.
- Vuile blanken, anti-Vlaams racisme, het laatste taboe!, Egmont Publishing, 2014.
- Verzet! Verzetsgids Tegen Islamisering, Egmont Publishing, 2017.
- Antwerpen weer van ons, Egmont Publishing, 2018.
- De-islamiseer Europa, Egmont Publishing, 2019.
- Omvolking, de grote vervanging, Hertogfonds VZW, 2022.
