= Daniel Tyrie =

Canadian political activist

Chairman of the Dominion Society of Canada
- Incumbent
- Assumed office 1 July 2025
- Preceded by: Position established

Executive Director of the People's Party of Canada
- In office 2019–2024
- Preceded by: Position established
- Succeeded by: Nathan McMillan

Personal details
- Born: 1996 (age 29–30)
- Citizenship: Canadian
- Party: Independent (2024-present)
- Other political affiliations: Dominion Society of Canada (2025–present); People's Party of Canada (2019–2024)
- Education: University of Waterloo
- Occupation: Political activist
- Known for: Anti-immigration activism, Canadian nationalism, founding the Dominion Society of Canada

Daniel Tyrie is a Canadian political activist who is the founder and current chairman of the Dominion Society of Canada. He is also the former Executive Director of the People's Party of Canada.

== Early life ==
Tyrie was born in 1996 and was raised in Toronto. He was educated at the University of Waterloo where he earned a Bachelor's of Arts in Political Science and Economics.

== Political career ==
Tyrie served as the People's Party of Canada's Executive Director from 2019 to 2024.

On 1 July 2025, he founded the Dominion Society of Canada alongside Greg Wycliffe and Ken Jones. The Dominion Society is a Canadian nationalist organization which advocates for a cessation of most forms of immigration to Canada and the remigration of immigrants not of European descent.

On 16 May 2026, it was announced that Tyrie would be a speaker at the 2026 Remigration Summit in Porto, Portugal. This conference was a platform for the Identitarian movement.

== Political views ==
=== Views on immigration ===
Tyrie has stated strong opposition to Canada's immigration policies as of 2025, and has advocated for remigration. Tyrie has also stated that he wants to end birthright citizenship. During an interview while attending the 2026 Remigration Summit in Portugal, Politico journalist Marion Solletty asked Tyrie and other attendees if they considered themselves to be racist to which Tyrie replied, "I don’t consider myself a hateful person. I don’t go around spitting on people of color because they’re in my country. I just don’t think they belong here."

=== Views on multiculturalism ===
Tyrie rejects multiculturalism, stating that, "Canada is not just a multicultural economic-zone. We are a nation forged through generations of struggle and sacrifice." As part of the Dominion Society's 11 step plan, Tyrie and the Dominion Society want to repeal the Canadian Multiculturalism Act and replace it with a piece of legislation known as the "National Cohesion Act", which would affirm Canada’s founding as a historically European, Christian, and bicultural English and French nation with a common civic identity.

== Criticism ==
The Canadian Anti-Hate Network considers the Dominion Society as the "political arm" of white supremacist group Second Sons. However, in an emailed statement to The Tyee, Tyrie disputed this characterization. Jeremy MacKenzie, the founder and leader of the Second Sons, denied that he or his group have any connections to the Dominion Society of Canada other than "the collective foaming at the mouth bloodlust from modern liberalism."
