= Geuzenbond =

Dutch nationalist youth organization

- Formation: 2018
- Founded at: Central Limburg, Netherlands
- Region served: Netherlands, Flanders, French Flanders
- Members: ~20 (2024 estimate)
- Publication: De Stormlamp (transl. The Storm Lantern)
- Affiliations: Patriot Front, Voorpost, Schild & Vrienden, Action Radar Europe
- Website: geuzenbond.nl

The Geuzenbond is a Dutch nationalist and identitarian youth organization. Established in 2018, it has been active in the Netherlands, Flanders, and French Flanders. The National Coordinator for Security and Counterterrorism (NCTV) has designated the group as far-right.

== History ==
The Geuzenbond was established around 2018 in central Limburg. Its name refers to the Geuzen who fought on the Dutch side against the Spanish during the Eighty Years' War. From the outset, the organization made itself known by placing stickers and posters in public spaces, featuring xenophobic slogans like "taal, erfgoed, eigenheid" (transl. "language, heritage, identity").

A first small-scale demonstration took place in 2020 against the use of English as the language of instruction at the University of Twente. By 2021, the Geuzenbond had expanded with chapters in Holland, North Brabant, Flemish Brabant and Overijssel. Its active following at that time was estimated to consist of about ten individuals. In 2023, the Geuzenbond launched a chapter in Dunkirk within French Flanders. Its following is estimated at fewer than ten members.

The Greater Netherlands Student Association (GNSV), a student society, began operating in Leiden in 2021. The founding presidium has been identified as members of the Geuzenbond. The GNSV's existence was announced in 2022 in De Stormlamp (transl. The Storm Lantern), the Geuzenbond's publication. Researcher Willem Wagenaar from the Anne Frank Foundation concluded that the two organizations are effectively the same. The GNSV disputes this, stating that they do not track whether their members are active in other organizations. The first praeses of the Nijmegen chapter of the GNSV, Daan Meershoek, also denied that most of their members are active in both organizations.

In contrast to the GNSV, Geuzenbond members generally prefer to remain anonymous. To ensure this anonymity, faces are blurred in social media photos, and members wear masks during public actions, such as the COVID-19 protest in Rotterdam in 2022. Nevertheless, through open-source intelligence, the Capitol Terrorists Exposers (CTE) collective identified many GNSV members as also being active within the Geuzenbond. Meershoek, for example, was recognized by his posture and clothing in photos of a flower-laying ceremony at the statue of William the Silent in Delft.

On 24 April 2024, the birthday of William, Voorpost and the Geuzenbond had a public gathering at the Noordeinde Palace in The Hague. A month later, during a pro-Palestinian demonstration outside the headquarters of Booking.com in Amsterdam, where approximately 200 people gathered to accuse the platform of complicity in war crimes for offering accommodations in the West Bank, two Geuzenbond members were spotted on a rooftop with an anticommunist and anti-Islamist banner.

As of 2024, the Geuzenbond had around 20 members and a presence on Telegram (~1,300 followers), X (~1,400 followers), and Instagram (~2,000 followers). The group maintains ties with international far-right organizations such as Patriot Front in the United States, Voorpost, Schild & Vrienden in Belgium, and Action Radar Europe, which was founded by the Austrian Martin Sellner.

== Ideology ==
The Geuzenbond promotes Greater Netherlands ideology, which seeks unification or closer collaboration within the Dutch-speaking region. The movement rejects globalization in favor of nationalism, aligning with the principles of the identitarian ideology, which opposes multiculturalism and strives for ethnic homogeneity. According to the Geuzenbond, failure to pursue these goals would lead to chaos and tyranny. The group's anti-immigration stance includes aspirations for a "homogeneous Dutch people within the historically established territory," reminiscent of Blut und Boden ideology.

The Geuzenbond also expresses solidarity with the white Afrikaners in South Africa, advocating for connections with an independent Afrikaner state. Researcher Willem Wagenaar described the group's ideology, which is rooted in solidarism, as the Flemish equivalent of classical Italian fascism. However, he did not view the group as a security risk, given its small size. The non-profit organization Global Project Against Hate and Extremism categorizes the Geuzenbond as part of the international Active Club Network, a decentralized neo-Nazi organization that promotes combat sports, masculinity, healthy living, and fraternity, while propagating white supremacy and the Great Replacement conspiracy theory.

The NCTV classifies the Geuzenbond as far-right and interprets its interest in combat sports as a potential preparation for a racial conflict. Meershoek denies that the Geuzenbond is a far-right organization, asserting that its members do not use violence for political means or advocate for the abolition of democracy. Nevertheless, the Geuzenbond describes itself as radical.

== Symbolism ==
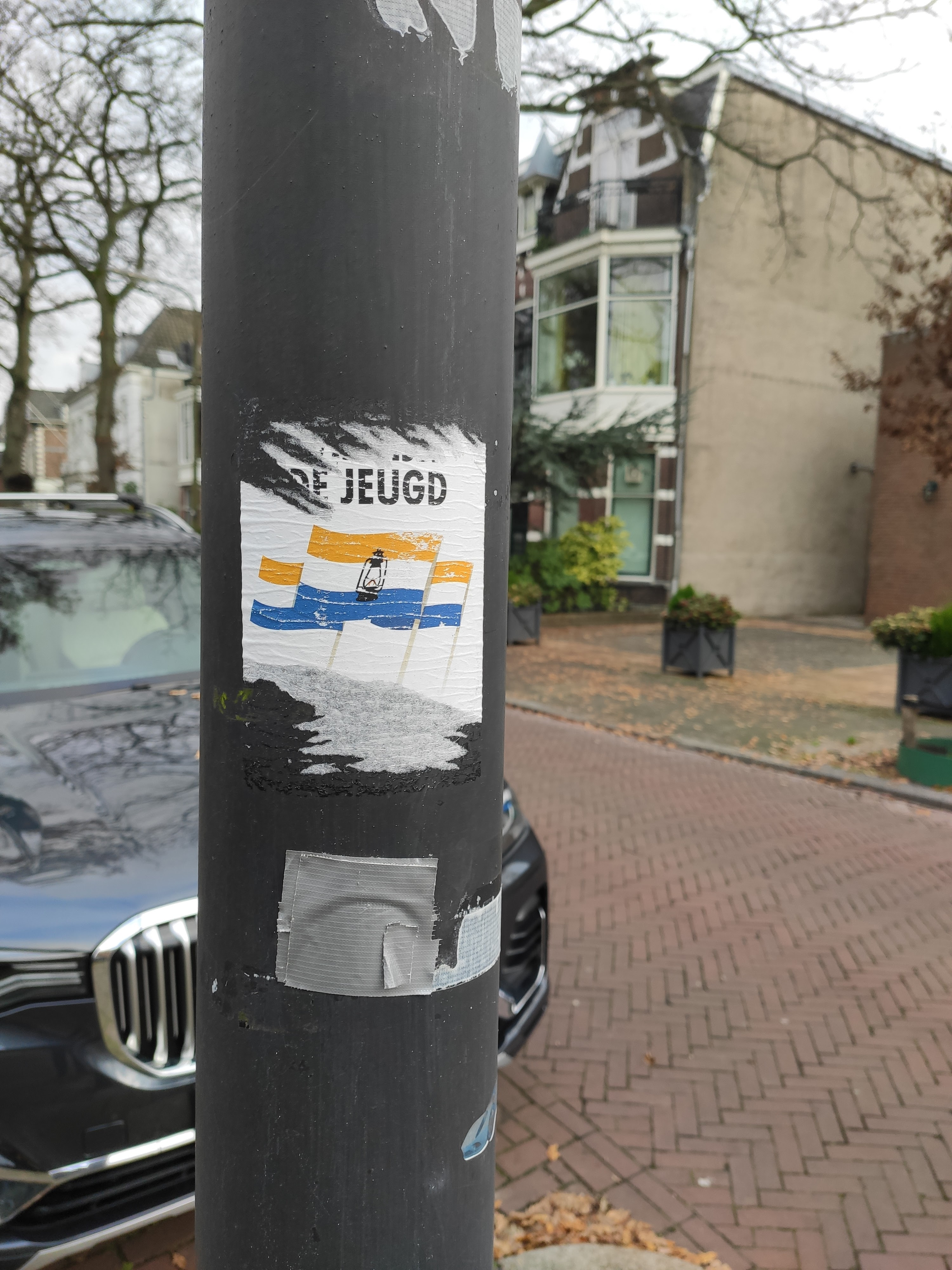
Partially removed Geuzenbond sticker with three Prince's Flags, 2022

The Geuzenbond frequently uses the Prince's Flag during demonstrations. Although the flag has historical origins, it became associated with Nazism in the 1930s due to its use by the NSB. The Geuzenbond claims to reference the Eighty Years' War with its use of the flag. This symbolic usage is considered an example of political dog whistles.
