= Dominion of Canada (disambiguation) =

Dominion of Canada can refer to:

- Canada, historically referred to as "Dominion of Canada" from Confederation until the 1950s
  - Name of Canada § Use of Dominion
  - Dominion § Canadian Confederation and evolution of the term Dominion
- Dominion of Canada Rifle Association, the national rifleman's association of Canada
- Dominion of Canada General Insurance Company, former life assurance company in Canada
- Dominion of Canada Northern Ontario Men's Curling Championship, former name of the NOCA Men's Provincial Championship
- LNER Class A4 4489 Dominion of Canada, steam locomotive formerly known as Woodcock
- Dominion Society of Canada, Canadian anti-immigration group
