= Remigration =

Forced or promoted return of non-European immigrants

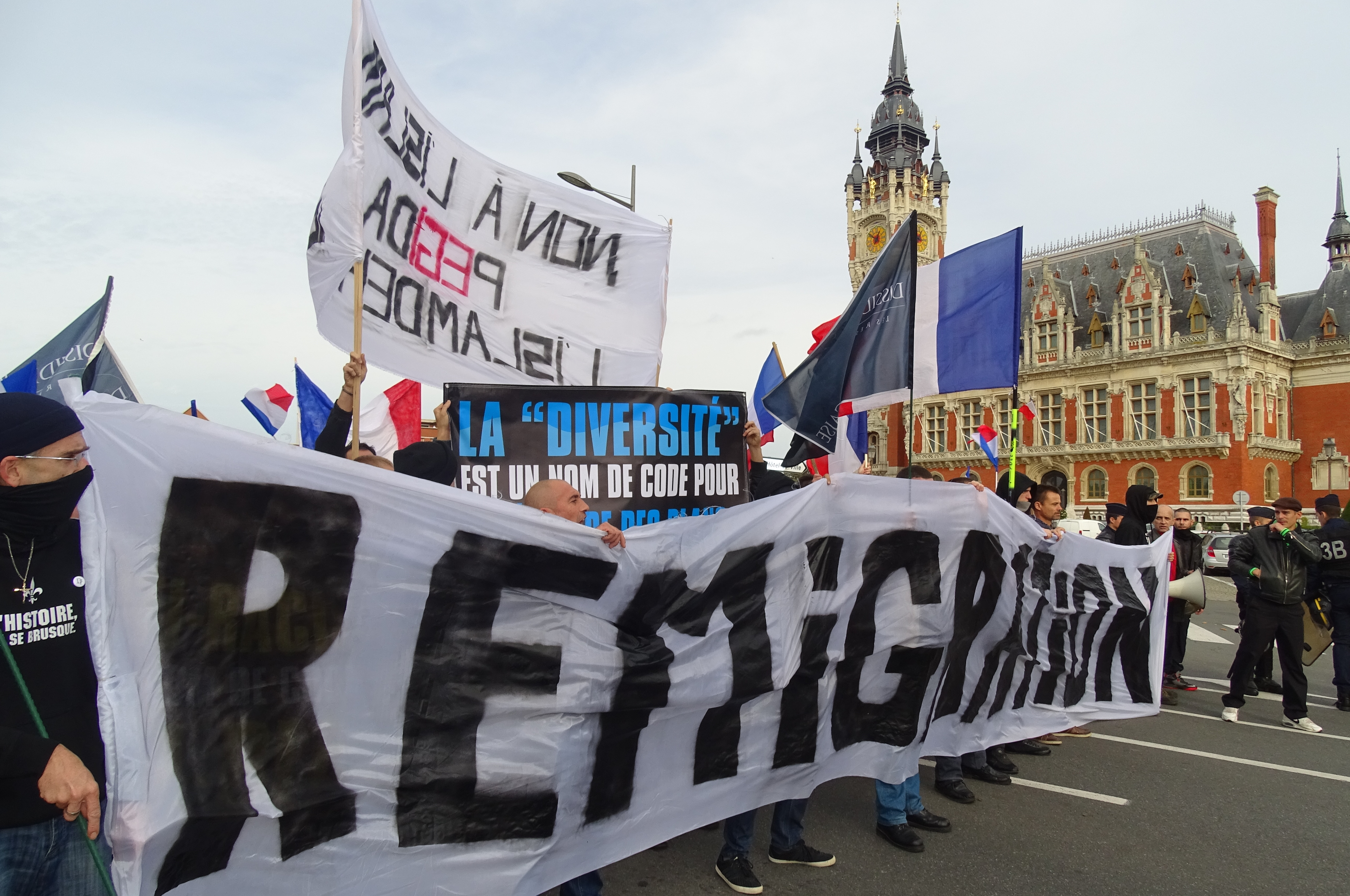
A banner advocating "remigration" during an anti-immigration protest in Calais, France, in 2015

Remigration is a far-right concept referring to the ethnic cleansing via mass deportation of non-white minority populations, especially immigrants and sometimes including native-born citizens, to their place of racial ancestry. Originating in Europe, the concept has since spread to the United States and Canada, where it has gained increasing prominence, and is especially popular within the Identitarian movement. Most proponents of remigration suggest excluding some persons with non-European background from such a mass deportation, based on a varyingly defined degree of assimilation into European culture.

Advocates of remigration promote the concept in pursuit of ethno-cultural homogeneity. According to Deutsche Welle, ethnopluralism, the Nouvelle Droite concept that different ethnicities require their own segregated living spaces, creates a need for remigration of people with "foreign roots". The Mexican scholar José Ángel Maldonado has described the idea as a "soft type of ethnic cleansing under the guise of deportation and segregation".

Presented by its proponents as a remedy to mass immigration and the perceived Islamisation of Europe, remigration has increasingly become an integral policy position of the Identitarian movement and other far-right political movements and parties. Research from the British Institute for Strategic Dialogue, conducted in April 2019, showed a distinct rise in conversations about remigration on the social media website Twitter between 2012 and 2019. Twitter, now owned by Elon Musk, and Telegram have been at the forefront of spreading the term into the mainstream.

== Etymology and development ==
The term remigration stems from Classical Latin remigrāre, "to return home", and was first used in English in the writings of Andrew Willet, an early-17th-century theologian within the Church of England. It had originally meant simply "returning", later was applied to the voluntary return of an immigrant to their place of origin, and is still used as such in social science.

Examples of the historic usage of the term remigration include the return of European Jews after the Second World War, as well as migration of people who had fled socialism and then returned postsocialism. According to journalist Ana P. Santos, up until the 2020s, "The term 'remigration' was primarily used in migration studies to describe the voluntary return of migrants and foreigners to their home countries." But during those years, there was also some discussion of involuntary migration, for example the economist Wolfgang Franz used the term remigration in 1987 for the involuntary return of foreign workers to their home countries.

Early evocations of the modern far-right concept of remigration can be found in French 1960s movements such as Europe-Action, considered the "embryonic form" of the Nouvelle Droite. Jean-Pierre Stirbois, then General Secretary of the National Front (FN), coined the expression "we will send them back" ('on les renverra') in an interview. He was the architect of the first electoral breakthrough of the FN in 1983, earning nearly 17% of the vote in the city of Dreux with the promise of "inverting the migratory flows". The idea is also expressed in the German slogan "Deutschland den Deutschen, Ausländer raus" ('Germany to Germans, foreigners out'), and in the motto of L'Œuvre Française "La France aux Français" ('France to the French').

=== Adoption by Identitarians ===
A core tenet of the Identitarian movement is the "Great Replacement", a conspiracy theory which states that white people are being replaced through migration, violence, and high birth rates by people from Africa, Muslims in particular. Reducing or halting immigration and removing migrant populations are presented as a solution to social issues caused by the Great Replacement.

In the 2010s the Identitarian movements were trying to avoid the use of historically tainted vocabulary while expressing their ideas, trying to create a "new language", for example, by replacing "race" with "culture". In the process, a successful strategy of reusing old terms with a new meaning had been discovered. In particular, while their meaning of "remigration" was a neologism intended to replace the tainted "deportation", the word itself had a reputable history. This was especially true in German-speaking countries, where remigration denoted the post-Second World war return of German refugees who fled from Nazism, thus creating positive associations. Similarly, the term "infiltration" was replaced with the Great Replacement, a myth which states that the white Christian European population is being progressively replaced with non-European populations, specifically from North Africa and the Middle East, through mass migration, demographic growth, and a drop in the European birth rate.

The French movement Generation Identity adopted remigration as part of its platform in 2015, though the term remained obscure until January 2024, with mass interest generated by the widely publicised 2023 Potsdam far-right meeting. The situation in Germany was similar; between 2018 and 2023, Identitäre Bewegung Deutschland and Alternative for Germany (Alternative für Deutschland, or AfD) occasionally used the term, and the AfD adopted it as part of its platform in 2021, but widespread use only began in 2023.

As of 2024, AfD had deemphasized making radical proposals on remigration, allowing the party to appeal to a broad electorate. At the same time, the concept was becoming increasingly normalised, with a wider audience now familiar with what was once an obscure Identitarian term.

Proponents of remigration often use the historical example of the expulsion of Pieds-Noirs from Algeria in 1962 as a successful past instance of organised forced remigration, though the exodus is described by some historians as ethnic cleansing stimulated by violence and threats from the National Liberation Front (FLN) and part of the native Muslim population, as evidenced by the slogan "the suitcase or the coffin" promoted by the FLN, the kidnappings of Pieds-Noirs, or the Oran massacre of 1962.

== Modern use ==
=== Europe ===
Since the 2010s, the idea of remigration has been used by thinkers and political leaders of the Identitarian movement, such as Guillaume Faye, Renaud Camus, Henry de Lesquen, or Martin Sellner, as a euphemism for the mass deportation of non-European immigrants and native residents with a migrant background, back to their country of origin, the criteria of exclusion being a vaguely defined degree of assimilation into European culture.

==== Austria ====
In March 2019, a week after the Christchurch mosque shootings and release of the shooter's manifesto (called The Great Replacement), Identitäre Bewegung Österreich, the Austrian branch of Generation Identity (GI), held a protest in Vienna driven by the conspiracy theory known as the "Great Replacement" of Austrians and openly calling for remigration of residents with a migrant background. By April 2019, a branch of the Freedom Party of Austria (FPÖ), who at the time were in coalition government as a junior partner with the Austrian People's Party, announced a "national call for remigration".

The FPÖ heavily emphasised remigration, particularly to Islamic countries, during its 2024 Austrian legislative election campaign. Party leader Herbert Kickl has called for the "remigration of uninvited strangers" from Austria with a focus on those who break the law.

==== Belgium ====
The Flemish nationalist party Vlaams Belang has called for "remigration" since 2011. In 2021 they called for the formation of an "Agency for Remigration".

In March 2025, Vlaams Belang leader Tom Van Grieken advocated for a "remigration policy" that would include illegal immigrants, asylum seekers and foreign national criminals. In April 2025 Mercina Claesen, a Vlaams Belang MP and leader of the party's youth wing, Vlaams Belang Jongeren, called for the remigration not only of illegal immigrants, but also legal immigrants who have committed crimes.

==== Finland ====
Remigration (Finnish: paluumuutto) has been featured prominently by the Finnish anti-immigration and populist right. The right-wing populist Finns Party declared in their party organ that "We have to shift from integration to remigration". The party leader and current Deputy Prime Minister Riikka Purra declared that "Remigration and strict immigration control are the main tools to prevent problems caused by immigration." In July 2026, Finns Party MEP Sebastian Tynkkynen was involved in a demonstration for remigration outside the European Parliament.

The "Remigration Summit" in Milan was attended by a delegation from the neo-fascist Blue-and-Black Movement.

==== France ====
In October 2017 Generation Identity set out a policy plan to its members, advocating for France to force former colonies to take migrants through emphasizing their status as a nuclear power and conditioning financial assistance on the repatriation of immigrants.

In March 2018 an Al Jazeera investigative team released footage and audio of Marine Le Pen's close confidant and former accountant, Nicolas Crochet, saying that the National Rally party would introduce a remigration programme to force immigrants back to their country of origin, in the event that they came to power in France.

In February 2019, speaking with L'Opinion, Debout la France candidate Emmanuelle Gave (daughter of French entrepreneur Charles Gave), advocated for remigration as a policy for voters in the European Parliament elections in May. In what Libération described as a "dangerous penetration of the ideas of the ultra-radical extreme right in the French political space", Gave announced that she was in favor of the party putting remigration "on the table".

According to an IFOP poll conducted in March 2022 prior to the French presidential elections, 63% of French people claim "not to be shocked" by the use of the word "remigration" and 66% support the idea of remigrating illegal immigrants, foreign criminals and "Fiche S" foreigners.

According to an OpinionWay poll from March 2022, 55% of French people also support the establishment of a Ministry of Remigration, an idea proposed by Eric Zemmour during the French presidential elections campaign.

As of 2024, Marine Le Pen's party, National Rally, has opposed remigration, citing Alternative for Germany's support for it as a reason to cut ties. Remigration continues to be supported by the National Rally's rival, Zemmour's Reconquête, and Marion Marechal's Identity–Liberties, a split from Reconquête.

==== Germany ====
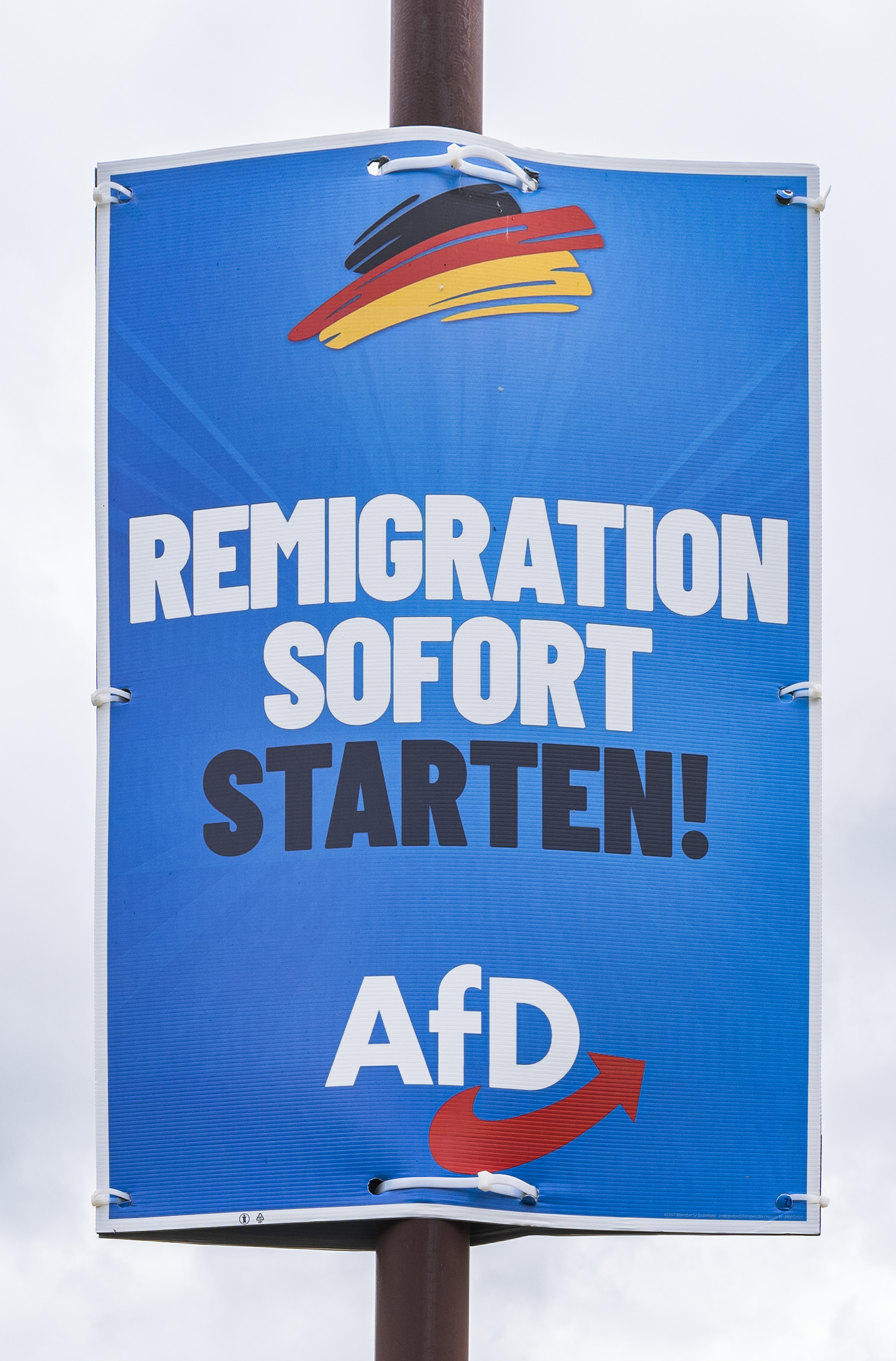
Election poster of the AfD in Thuringia supporting remigration (2024)

In March 2018, Identitarian protesters were arrested for trespassing on the roof of Frankfurt Central Station, and hanging a banner that reads "Endstation Multikulti. Notbremse ziehen. Remigration" (Terminal station Multikulti. Pull emergency brake. Remigration), while chanting phrases like "home, freedom, tradition" from a megaphone.

In March 2019 the German Identitarian movement began a "remigration campaign" which included governmental petitions, a "flashmob" outside a mosque and a demonstration in front of the Federal Ministry of the Interior, Building and Community in Berlin, where the protesters demanded the repatriation of Islamic refugees back to the Middle East. It was reported that the group were distributing posters aimed at Syrian refugees that read "The war is over. Syria needs you" and referenced a "remigration policy".

In May 2019, Katrin Ebner-Steiner, leader of AfD in Bavaria, indicated that the deportation of non-whites from Germany was a preferable policy to racial integration, after she called for "Remigration instead of integration" at a conference for the Southern wing of the party.

Ahead of the 2019 European Parliament election, Germany's opposition party, the far-right Alternative for Germany, made remigration part of their policy platform, openly calling for "remigration, instead of mass immigration", and stating that "Germany and Europe must put in place remigration programs on the largest possible scale". AfD MP Markus Frohnmaier has repeatedly worn a slogan reading "Remigration Ministry" into the Bundestag.

In January 2024, Correctiv reported that members of the AfD had secretly met with figures from the German and Austrian far-right in a meeting in Potsdam in November 2023, in which they allegedly discussed a "remigration" plan for deporting immigrants, which could include naturalised German citizens. The figures present included the Identitarian activist Martin Sellner.

In July 2025 the AfD Bundestag group removed a demand for "remigration" from its seven-point policy proposal as part of a softening of its immigration stance ahead of the next German federal election. However, many political scientists are sceptical if the shift is "anymore than cosmetic".

In September 2026, after his victory in the 2026 Saxony-Anhalt state election, AfD candidate Ulrich Siegmund preposed using the Germany military to carry out a "remigration and deportation offensive."

==== Italy ====
Lega Giovani, the youth wing of the right-wing populist Italian party Lega, advocated for remigration following violent incidents in January 2025 involving migrants in Como and Lombardy, and received support from the Lombardy regional leader of the party.

In May 2025, Lega MEP Roberto Vannacci addressed a 'Remigration Summit' in Milan, expressing support for remigration and stating that "remigration is not a slogan but a concrete proposal." Vannacci later broke away from Lega and founded National Future, a party focused on promoting remigration.

In May 2025, Lega MEP Isabella Tovaglieri similarly called for a "systematic remigration campaign".

In April 2026, Lega's leader Matteo Salvini called for remigration at a Milan rally, suggesting a "points-based residence permit" where "after a number of mistakes you go back to your own country".

The minor neo-fascist party CasaPound supports remigration (along with other far-right organizations like Veneto Fronte Skinheads, Rete dei Patrioti e Brescia ai Bresciani) and proposed a law about it on 7 July 2026.

==== Netherlands ====
In 2021, the Party for Freedom (PVV) called for the formation of a Ministry for Remigration in its manifesto, but removed this policy from its programme for the 2023 Dutch general election. Remigration was again included in the PVV's programme for the 2025 Dutch general election, where the party advocated introducing a voluntary remigration scheme that would involve migrants renouncing Dutch citizenship. In February 2026, PVV leader Geert Wilders called for "large-scale remigration programs" during a speech in the Dutch Parliament, which would be largely voluntary, but "mandatory for criminals, profiteers, and illegal immigrants".

In its 2023 election programme, JA21 advocated for "promoting remigration in case of failed integration".

The Forum for Democracy (FvD) advocates for "mass remigration" in order to maintain a "white Europe", and has criticised the PVV for focusing more on reducing immigration than promoting remigration.

==== Portugal ====
Rita Matias, a Chega member of the Portuguese Parliament and the leader of the Chega Youth, stated that "remigration is the solution" in February 2025.

In April 2025, Chega leader Andre Ventura expressed support for remigration of foreign nationals and dual nationals who have committed crimes in Portugal as part of his 2025 Portuguese legislative election campaign.

==== Spain ====
Vox Secretary General Ignacio Garriga has called for "mass remigrations" of illegal immigrants from Catalonia in 2024, following an increase in sexual assaults in the region.

Vox's economic and housing program, presented in June 2025, explicitly calls for "remigration" of legal immigrants who "decide not to integrate" in Spain. Vox MP Rocío de Meer, the party's spokeswoman for demographic emergency and social policies, has suggested eight million people in Spain, including second generation immigrants, would be eligible for remigration if Vox took power, though the party subsequently clarified that this was not the number that Vox believes should be deported.

==== Sweden ====
The far-right nationalist party Alternative for Sweden (AfS) advocate the revocation of citizenship and the forced remigrations of individuals who do not meet the party's criteria for citizenship. Alternative for Sweden party leader, Gustav Kasselstrand, asserted that compulsory measures would drive at least one million immigrants out of Sweden. The party's strategy involves a complete overhaul of the current immigration system, including the dissolution of the Swedish Migration Agency in favor of a new "Return Agency" tasked with re-evaluating every residence permit granted since 2000. In March 2018, Jeff Ahl gave a speech in the Riksdag, stating that hundreds of thousands of people would be deported out of Sweden if Alternative for Sweden gained power.

The syncretic Örebro Party (ÖP or ÖrP) also advocates for remigration policies alongside strong secularism, and assimilationist policies such as immediate closure of Islamic charter schools. Örebro Party leader, Markus Allard, caused significant public debate in 2025 by claiming that Sweden is "the land for/belongs to the Swedes" and that the Örebro Party favors a large scale remigration policy. He also criticised the Sweden Democrats (SD) for, according to him, allowing too many immigrants into the country under their watch as confidence and supply to the Kristersson cabinet.

In its political program for the 2026 Swedish general election the Örebro Party writes that they want to "stop the ongoing population replacement" and make Sweden a monocultural society, rather than a multicultural one. The party also writes that this "will be a Sweden where ethnic Swedes are once again the clear majority." The party also claims that "Sweden belongs to the Swedes" and "No other people shall ever be able to lay claims on Sweden. This is our land.” and states that they want to implement measures to decrease the immigrant population in Sweden through remigration, closed borders and a strict assimilation policy.

==== United Kingdom ====
Generation Identity UK and Ireland activists have engaged in the promotion of remigration. In April 2018, Hope not Hate detailed how, while the group was relatively unknown by the mainstream media; its "core beliefs" of ethnopluralism, and remigration of non-whites from Europe, was more extreme than any policies of the English Defence League. In May 2018, The Times was reporting how the extremist organisation was promoting the singling out of Black British people for priority remigration from the UK.

As of 2025, the Homeland Party, and Britain First support remigration as a policy. Rupert Lowe's Restore Britain party has also been described by York Councillor Andrew Hollyer as using "remigration" rhetoric.

According to Nick Lowles, one of the authors of a report by Hope not Hate, in a related concept, members of the counter-jihad movement "believe there will be a confrontation between Islam and the West and there can be no accommodation so the only solution can be to expel followers of Islam from Britain and Europe".

=== North America ===
==== Canada ====
The concept of remigration has been advocated for by various far-right and alt-right groups in Canada, notably Diagolon, the Second Sons, and the Dominion Society of Canada.

==== United States ====
Homeland Security
(@DHSgov)
tweeted:

The stakes have never been higher, and the goal has never been more clear:

Remigration now.

November 28, 2025

Usage of the term in the United States has spiked in the months leading up to the 2024 presidential election. In September, the Republican Party’s presidential nominee, Donald Trump, called for "remigration" of illegal immigrants to their home countries and suspending refugee resettlement, also pledging to "do large deportations in Springfield, Ohio", referring to the town's community of legal Haitian immigrants. The usage mainstreamed the term in the country. In May 2025 the Department of State released a "reorganisation chart" that included the creation of an "Office of Remigration". As President, Trump once again endorsed "remigration" in June 2025 as "reversing the invasion" of illegal immigrants into the United States. In July 2025 Trump claimed that the One Big Beautiful Bill Act would allow for remigration to be implemented. White House Deputy Chief of Staff Stephen Miller has been described as an advocate for remigration within the Trump administration.

In October 2025, the U.S. Department of Homeland Security triggered controversy after tweeting “remigrate” from its official X account.

In June 2026, U.S. Representative Andy Ogles introduced legislation called the "Remigration Act", expanding the scope of denaturalisations.

== Criticism ==
Michael Weiss and Julia Ebner, of the Institute for Strategic Dialogue, have identified the "identitarian concept of 'remigration'" as having accelerated since 2014, and associated it with increasing calls from the far-right for mass deportation of non-white Europeans, in what they described as "ethnic cleansing". Ebner also stated that avoiding the word "deportation" is useful to sidestep associations of deportations during the Holocaust. The term's deliberate use of euphemistic language has been identified as a strategic tactic to make remigration more palatable to mainstream audiences. Researcher Cynthia Miller-Idriss notes that "relabelling concepts like the forced deportation and ethnic cleansing of immigrants as 're-migration' can make hateful expressions seem more acceptable to a broader range of ordinary individuals".

Francis Combes has described remigration as a form of demagoguery that would lead to ethnic cleansing. Arguing that France has had a mixed genetic heritage since Gallic times, he has questioned the practicality of implementing remigration and the number of generations that would require investigation in pursuit of "purity".

Critics have raised significant concerns about the feasibility and legality of implementing remigration policies. The concept presents fundamental practical challenges, as the precise mechanism for deporting naturalised citizens and those born in the country remains unclear. Experts in human rights law note that remigration policies would likely violate international legal principles, particularly the principle of non-refoulement enshrined in the 1951 Refugee Convention, which prohibits the deportation of individuals to countries where their life or freedom would be threatened.

From an economic perspective, critics argue that remigration policies contradict the actual drivers of contemporary demographic challenges. Labour economists point out that the factors increasing the appeal of remigration rhetoric - falling birth rates, labour shortages, and a lack of new businesses and services - are most feasibly addressed through immigration rather than mass deportation.

Some political scientists argue that mainstream adoption of remigration rhetoric and policies, rather than countering far-right movements, may actually strengthen them. Research suggests that when centrist and centre-right parties adopt far-right policy positions, the electoral advantage typically accrues to the actual far-right parties rather than to the parties attempting to co-opt their rhetoric.

=== Historical and ideological parallels to Nazism and fascism ===
Scholars have drawn parallels between remigration ideology and Nazi and fascist movements. Remigration shares conceptual similarities with Nazi and fascist racial ideology, which centred on concepts of ethnic and racial purity and motivated forced deportations and ethnic cleansing in Nazi-occupied Europe. Scholar Dagmar Herzog has characterised modern remigration rhetoric as a manifestation of "postmodern fascism," arguing that contemporary far-right movements targeting Arab and African migrants echo historical fascist targeting of racialised minorities, particularly Jews in the Nazi period.

Historians have noted ideological similarities between remigration and fascism. Historian Emilio Gentile has defined fascism as centred on "the absolute primacy of the nation, understood as an ethnically homogeneous organic community," a goal that remigration advocates similarly pursue through the removal of non-majority ethnic groups. Both remigration and historical fascist movements employ mass deportation as a primary mechanism for achieving ethnic homogeneity.

The terminology used to describe remigration has also drawn historical scrutiny. The term "remigration" was adopted by contemporary far-right movements partly because it had positive historical associations with post-Second World War refugee returns in German-speaking countries, thereby avoiding the word "deportation" and its associations with Nazi-era forced relocations and the Holocaust. This linguistic choice has been noted by scholars as significant because Nazi Germany's own population policies escalated progressively. Prior to World War II, Nazi leadership promoted Jewish emigration through discriminatory policies; by 1939, these policies had escalated to forced deportation and ghettoization; and eventually to genocide and the Holocaust, resulting in the systematic murder of approximately six million Jews. Scholars studying remigration rhetoric have drawn attention to this historical escalation pattern, cautioning that similar incremental escalations have preceded mass atrocities in the twentieth century.

In the United States, scholars have linked remigration discourse to white nationalist ideology. Analysts note that some proponents frame remigration as a mechanism for preserving or establishing white majority populations in given territories. Communication scholars studying the concept have characterised it as "an established part of the linguistic toolbox of white supremacy" in European contexts.

Scholars have also examined the strategic use of euphemistic language in remigration discourse. The vagueness of the term "remigration" has been identified by researchers as allowing for the introduction of extreme positions into mainstream political discourse whilst obscuring their ideological roots. This linguistic strategy has been compared to historical fascist use of euphemisms to obscure the true nature of ethnic and racial policies.

== See also ==
- 1938 expulsion of Polish Jews from Germany
- Immigration and crime
- Voluntary return
- Deportation
- White nationalism
- Identitarian movement
- Nativism
- Great Replacement conspiracy theory
- Back-to-Africa movement
- "Go back to where you came from"
- War-time Refugees Removal Act 1949, aspect of the White Australia policy

== Bibliography ==
- Albertini, Dominique (28 February 2017). "La "remigration", nouvelle frontière de l'extrême droite ?" [The "remigration", new frontier of the far right?]. Libération. Archived from the original on 24 May 2019.
- Bergmann, Eirikur (1 May 2024). "Eurabia". Weaponizing Conspiracy Theories. ISBN 9781003460770.
- Buck, Christopher (2009). Religious myths and visions of America : how minority faiths redefined America's world role. Westport, Conn.: Praeger. ISBN 978-0313359590.
- Burden, Emily Louise (2023). The violence of 'Non-violence': A socio-technical study of the ethnocultural politics and strategies of New Right identitarianism (PhD thesis). University of Southampton.
- Camus, Jean-Yves (2017). "D'où vient l'expression "remigration"?". Le Soleil.
- Ebner, Julia (23 March 2021). Going Dark: The Secret Social Lives of Extremists. Bloomsbury Publishing. ISBN 978-1-5266-4209-7.
- Havlicek, Sasha; Guerin, Cécile (12 April 2019). "La "remigration", un concept qui essaime au-delà des identitaires" [Remigration, a concept that goes beyond identity]. Libération.
- Goetz, Judith (2024). "Our Only Weapons are Good Arguments and Dissemination: The Austrian Identitarians Taken at Their Word". International Journal of Communication. 18: 5088–5106.
- Guhl, Jakob (1 July 2019). "Debatte Begriffe der neuen Rechten - Neue Wörter, alter Hass" [Debate terms of the new right - New words, old hate]. Die Tageszeitung.
- Kononova, Anastasiia (2024). Populist Far Right and Radical Movements: Analysing the AfD and Generation Identity's Shared Narratives on (Re)migration (PDF) (Master of Art thesis). Vienna, Austria: Central European University.
- Maldonado, José Ángel (2020). "Manifestx: toward a rhetoric loaded with future". Communication and Critical/Cultural Studies. 17 (1): 104–110. doi:10.1080/14791420.2020.1723799. ISSN 1479-1420. S2CID 216420424., download from Maldonados home page
- Miller-Idriss, Cynthia (11 January 2022). Hate in the Homeland: The New Global Far Right. Princeton University Press. ISBN 978-0-691-23429-8.
- Wilhelmsen, Fredrik (2 October 2021). "Heroic Pasts and Anticipated Futures: A Comparative Analysis of the Conceptions of History of the Nordic Resistance Movement and Generation Identity". Politics, Religion & Ideology. 22 (3–4): 277–301. doi:10.1080/21567689.2021.1968842. ISSN 2156-7689.
