= Barbara Pas =

Flemish politician

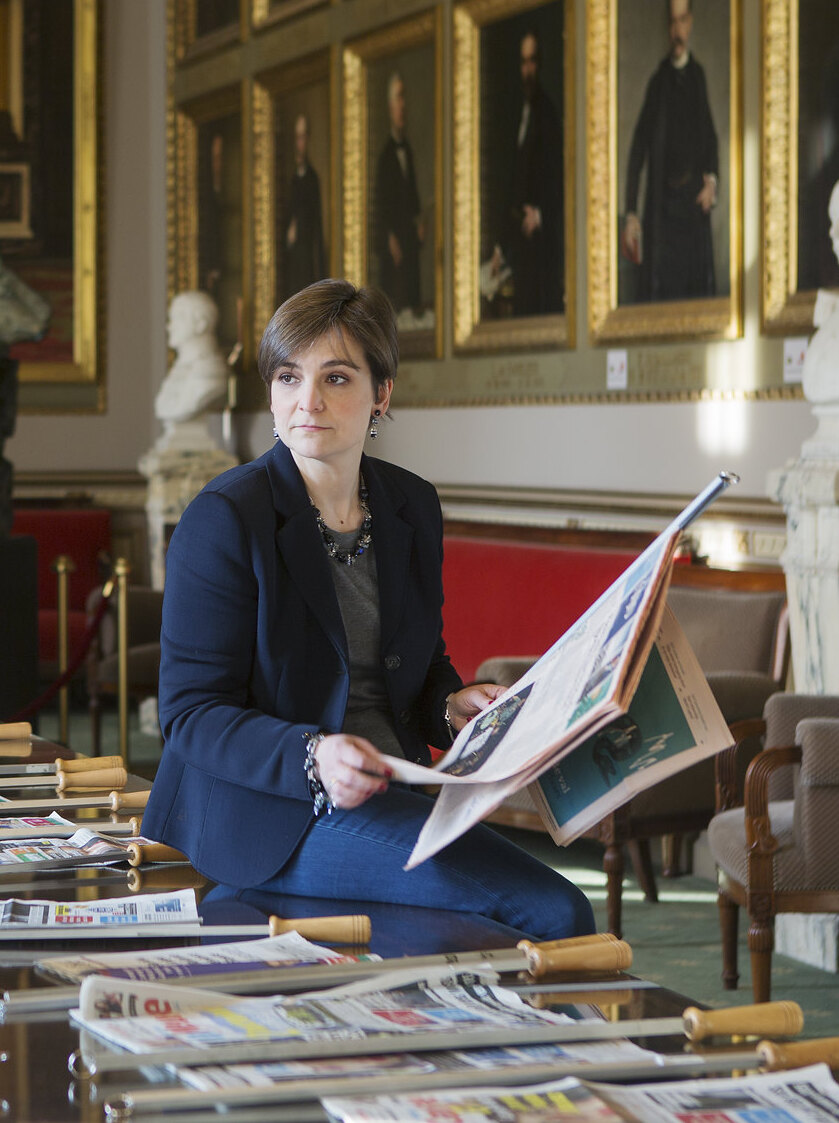

Member of the Chamber of Representatives
- Incumbent
- Assumed office 10 June 2007

Personal details
- Born: 1 March 1981 (age 45) Temse, Belgium
- Party: Vlaams Belang
- Other political affiliations: Vlaams Belang Jongeren
- Education: Catholic University of Leuven

Barbara Pas (born 1 March 1981) is a Belgian politician and a member of the Chamber of Representatives for Vlaams Belang. She is also the floor leader of the party in the Chamber and serves as the spokeswoman for the VB on a federal level. Pas previously served as national chairwoman of the Vlaams Belang Jongeren.

== Early life ==
Pas was born in Temse, Belgium, in 1981. She studied a degree in engineering at the Catholic University of Leuven during which she was a member of the Flemish nationalist Nationalistische Studentenvereniging and the Katholiek Vlaams Hoogstudentenverbond groups.

== Political career ==
Pas served as the president of the Vlaams Belang Jongeren, the youth wing of the Vlaams Belang from October 2009 to March 2012. She was elected to the Chamber of Representatives in 2007. Since December 2012, she has been national vice-president of Vlaams Belang. In April 2013, she succeeded Gerolf Annemans the VB's group leader in the Chamber of Representatives for the Flemish Interest. She continued this until May 2014, when her party did not have enough MPs to have another fraction. She was reappointed to the role again in 2019, after Vlaams Belang did get enough members for a parliamentary faction again. In 2020, Pas expressed criticism of moves by the Black Lives Matter protests in Belgium to remove statues of Leopold II, King of the Belgians in public spaces. She argued that while she is a republican and that Leopold had oppressed the Flemish community, she also believed that statues of historical figure should remain, and stated that "It bothers me that an American incident is being imported here." Pas has also negotiated with Bart De Wever to end the cordon sanitaire applied to the VB and believes it will be lifted by 2024 as both the VB and the N-VA will gain enough votes to work together.

In 2021, Belgian journalist Hind Fraihi published in her book Behind the Shield of the Extreme Right that Pas was a member of the closed Facebook group She Wolves which allegedly shared fascist content and called for violence. In response, both Pas and Vlaams Belang distanced themselves from the group. She declared to have been added indirectly.

In 2022, she co-authored the book Bottomless along with economist Lode Vereeck which offered a critique of Belgium's financial systems.

During the local elections of October 2024 she doubled the seats in her hometown Dendermonde equalling the Mayor's results, and obtained 4790 preferential votes.
