= Mercina Claesen =

Belgian politician (born 2002)

Member of the Flemish Parliament
- Incumbent
- Assumed office 2024

Personal details
- Born: 27 March 2002 (age 24) Genk, Belgium
- Party: Vlaams Belang
- Education: KU Leuven

Mercina Claesen (born 27 March 2002 in Genk) is a Belgian politician of the Vlaams Belang party. She has been a member of the Flemish Parliament since 2024 representing the Limburg constituency.

== Biography ==
Claesen was born in Genk and now lives in Munsterbilzen. She completed a bachelor's and then a master's degree in social policy at KU Leuven. During her studies she was active in the Flemish nationalist Nationalistische Studentenvereniging group. She also worked part-time as a special education teacher.

Claesen became active in the Vlaams Belang Jongeren (VBJ) as a teenager and has been the spokesperson and provincial coordinator of VBJ in Limburg since 2022. During the 2024 Belgian regional elections, she was elected to the Flemish Parliament and is the baby of the house as the youngest serving member.
