= Office of Remigration =

US Department of State unit

- Seal of the United States Department of State

Agency overview
- Formed: 2025
- Jurisdiction: United States
- Employees: ~15
- Agency executive: Assistant Secretary, Bureau of Population, Refugees, and Migration
- Parent department: Bureau of Population, Refugees, and Migration

The Office of Remigration is a unit within the Bureau of Population, Refugees, and Migration of the United States Department of State established in 2025 to support remigration of immigrants in the United States. The office was first proposed in May 2025 as part of an overhaul of the department's organizational structure.

== History ==
On May 29, 2025, the State Department published a press statement by Secretary of State Marco Rubio titled "Next Steps on Building an America First State Department", which outlined a variety of changes to the Department. The document included a new organizational chart of the department, including the Office of Remigration within the Bureau of Population, Refugees, and Migration. In a May 2025 congressional notification from the State Department wrote that the Office would initially be staffed by reassigned personnel from the Office of Western Hemisphere Affairs.

The proposal consolidates the functions of the Bureau into three "functional offices" under a Deputy Assistant Secretary of State for Migration Matters, with the Office of Remigration being one of the functional offices with the role of a "hub for immigration issues and repatriation tracking."

In May 2026, Wired published an investigation into the Office. The office's role was described as to "process payments possibly worth tens of millions of dollars to facilitate the deportations of immigrants to countries they may not even be from", with "little to no oversight". In an emailed statement, the State Department wrote that "President Trump promised to reverse the Biden-era invasion of illegal aliens and once again make America a country for Americans. Remigration puts these words into action."

An August 2025 organization chart divided the office into two units, "Voluntary Returns and Maritime Migration" and "Overseas Solutions" for third-country deportations. "Under the orders of Stephen Miller", the office negotiated third-country deportation agreements. As of June 2026, the administration "authorized or pledged at least $410 million to facilitate agreements with 31 countries". Christopher Landau "has been involved in negotiating the third-country deportation agreements".

== Reaction ==
The Office's establishment drew praise from European far-right leaders and organizations, including Martin Sellner, an Austrian far-right activist.

== See also ==
- Remigration
