= Bart Claes =

Belgian politician

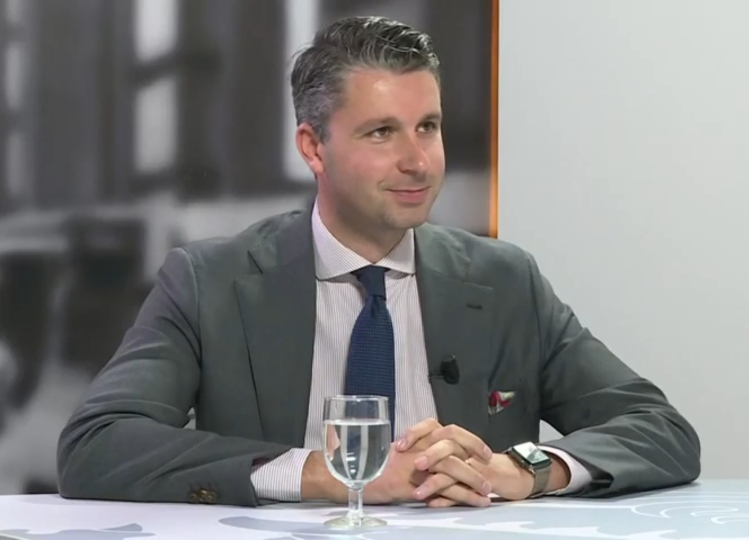

Member of the Flemish parliament
- Incumbent
- Assumed office 2019

Personal details
- Born: Bart Claes; 8 April 1989 (age 37) Mechelen, Belgium
- Party: Vlaams Belang (2014–present)
- Other political affiliations: N-VA (until 2014)
- Education: University of Antwerp; University of Ghent

Bart Claes (born 8 April 1989) is a Belgian politician who has been a member of the Flemish parliament for the Flemish nationalist Vlaams Belang party since 2019.

== Biography ==
Claes was born in Mechelen and grew up in Rumst. His father Luc Claes was a councilor for the New Flemish Alliance and the alderman in Rumst. He studied law at the University of Antwerp and the University of Ghent. During his studies Claes was a member of the Nationalistische Studentenvereniging and the New Flemish Alliance party. In 2014 he left the N-VA due to disagreeing with the course of the party and joined Vlaams Belang. After graduating, Claes worked for Katoen Natie.

From 2016 to 2020, Claes was chairman of the Vlaams Belang Jongeren. In 2019, Claes was elected as a member of the Flemish Parliament for the Antwerp region. During the 2019 Belgian federal election, Claes managed the VB's election campaign and claimed that he looked to both the Brexit and Donald Trump presidential campaigns as examples of how to target voters.

In 2020, Claes received criticism from the Flemish Groen! party after sharing a post on Twitter referring to transgender Belgian Minister Petra De Sutter as "the personification of cultural Marxism." Flemish Parliament speaker Liesbeth Homans described Claes' tweet as "reprehensible" but said she defended his right to freedom of expression. Claes later claimed his remark was partially taken out of context.
