= Greater Netherlands Student Association =

Dutch conservative student fraternity

GNSV
- Motto: Fides, Honor, Patria
- Location: Leiden, Nijmegen, Utrecht
- Established: September 2021 (Leiden); August 2023 (Nijmegen); September 2025 (Utrecht)
- Colors: Red, White, and Green (Leiden) Black, Gold, and Green (Nijmegen) White, Red, and Green (Utrecht)
- Website: Official website

The Greater Netherlands Student Association (Dutch: Groot-Nederlandse Studentenvereniging; GNSV) is a nationalist, right-wing extremist student organization in the Netherlands, with chapters in Leiden, Nijmegen and Utrecht. The association was founded in Leiden in 2021 by members of the Geuzenbond, a far-right identitarian youth organization. The association maintains close ties with the Nationalistische Studentenvereniging (NSV!), which can be seen as its Flemish counterpart.

== History and structure ==
The GNSV was founded in September 2021 in Leiden. The following year, its existence was announced in De Stormlamp (transl. The Storm Lantern), the publication of the Geuzenbond. Several indications suggest that the two organizations are closely intertwined. Researcher Willem Wagenaar from the Anne Frank Foundation concluded that they are essentially the same organization. The GNSV denies this, stating they do not monitor whether their members are active in other organizations.

In contrast to the Geuzenbond, GNSV members are identifiable in their outings on social media. Nevertheless, praeses Frank Dijk and the two other members of the founding presidium were recognizable as Geuzenbond members who marched masked at a COVID-19 demonstration in Rotterdam in January 2022. Daan Meershoek, the first praeses of the Nijmegen chapter, appeared alongside Dijk and other GNSV members in a Geuzenbond photo taken during a flower-laying ceremony at the statue of William the Silent in Delft. Through open source intelligence, the Capitol Terrorists Exposers (CTE) collective determined that many GNSV members are also active within the Geuzenbond. Meershoek has denied that the majority of their members are involved in both organizations.

The Nijmegen chapter was founded in 2023. That year, Meershoek and several other members attended a lecture at KU Leuven by far-right Austrian activist Martin Sellner, organized by the Flemish Nationalistische Studentenvereniging (NSV!). Sellner, who has connections to neo-Nazi circles, was previously linked to the Christchurch mosque shootings in 2019, as he received financial support from the perpetrator and publicly expressed sympathy for him.

Even before the GNSV participated in their first introduction market at Radboud University, objections to their presence were voiced on social media. During the event, GNSV members clashed with antifascists, leading to three members of the latter group being detained by the police. This violence was condemned by Mayor Hubert Bruls. However, the court later acquitted all, citing insufficient evidence to determine culpability for the fight. Subsequently, Tom Steenblok, chair of the Knokpartij in the student council, urged the university to exclude the GNSV, stating their ideas "contradict the rights of women, people of color, and LGBT+ individuals." Rector magnificus Han van Krieken declared that the GNSV had been warned that they would only be welcome as long as they refrained from racism, sexism, or exclusion and that the association had agreed to these terms. In Leiden, the GNSV was refused a stand at the market because they had failed to submit their application on time.

Meershoek visited the far-right French student association Cocarde Étudiante in Paris in 2024. This group is known for connections with neo-Nazis. The following August the GNSV was allowed to recruit members at introduction markets in both Nijmegen and Leiden. Protests by Leiden Tegen Fascisme (transl. Leiden Against Fascism) occurred in Leiden. Meanwhile, in Nijmegen, members of the Antifascistische Aktie (transl. Antifascist Action) handed out flyers next to the GNSV booth for about 30 minutes, labeling the association as neo-Nazis, until security asked them to leave. Both universities defended their decision to allow GNSV participation, citing the association's legal status. According to their own statements, the association grew in 2024 from a few dozen to around forty members.

In January 2025, the GNSV announced plans to establish a chapter in Utrecht with an anticipated launch in the 2025–2026 academic year. Utrecht chapter praeses Frank van Breukelen stated that there is a "need for a right-wing voice" in the city. The association aims to offer a space for politically engaged students to experience student life. Van Breukelen is group leader for Forum for Democracy in the Provincial Council of Utrecht. At the time of this announcement, Dijk and Meershoek had been serving as praeses of the Leiden and Nijmegen chapters, respectively, since the association's founding. In the city council, parties such as BIJ1, GroenLinks, Student & Starter, PvdA, DENK, and the Party for the Animals raised concerns about the arrival of the association. Municipal executive Linda Voortman emphasized the right to freedom of association, but stated that such ties "stand in direct opposition to the values of Utrecht as a human rights city." Utrecht University and Hogeschool Utrecht both stated that they have no contact with the association, and that any future request for official recognition would be assessed according to existing criteria, including a prohibition on political interests for student associations.

In March 2025, members of the GNSV placed their own QR codes over municipal ones on street signs for Prince Bernhard in Utrecht. The action was a protest against the addition of information about the prince’s Nazi past. According to the association, this addition constitutes an attack on Dutch culture and history. In the statement linked via their QR code, they called the municipality’s policy “hypocritical,” claiming that communist dictators are not similarly ‘contextualized’.

In August 2025, a member of the GNSV was arrested on suspicion of planning a terrorist attack.

== Ideology and mission ==
The GNSV view themselves as the heir to a 'Greater-Netherlands student tradition' that has its origins in the Dietsch Studentenverbond founded in the 1920s. They present themselves as a conservative-right student association operating within the bounds of the rule of law. Journalist Haro Kraak however, argued in de Volkskrant that the organization functions as a vehicle to make the far-right ideology of the Geuzenbond more visible.

They maintain close ties with the Flemish NSV! and claim to largely support their ideology. Both organizations featured the same quote on their websites from Ernest Van der Hallen, a Flemish nationalist youth leader during the interwar period: "Be radical, be principled; be absolute; be what the bourgeois calls: an extremist."

In 2023, the GNSV, NSV! and Geuzenbond came together at the Greater Netherlands Youth Congress. The congress was ideologically aimed at achieving unification or fostering closer collaboration within Dutch-speaking regions while rejecting globalism in favor of nationalism.

Unlike the Geuzenbond, the GNSV have only rarely made radical statements publicly. However, far-right dog whistles, such as the OK symbol, can be found in their content. Dijk has stated that they reject the label "far-right," as it implies using anti-democratic means to achieve political objectives. Wagenaar has described their ideology as an extension of the Geuzenbond’s, rooted in solidarism, which he characterized as a Flemish variant of classical Italian fascism. They've denied that their members adhere to this ideology.

== Traditions and symbolism ==
The GNSV's traditions and customs strongly resemble those of their Flemish counterpart, the NSV!. Their emblem is nearly identical, and they also wear gray wool caps trimmed with the association’s colors and sashes in matching colors across their chests. This practice is common among Flemish student associations. The Leiden chapter uses red-white-green colors, while the Nijmegen chapter uses black-gold-green. These student attributes also draw parallels to German Burschenschaften, predominantly right-wing student associations that the GNSV cites as an inspiration. Officially, the Prince's Flag is not used, although it does appear in social media posts. Dijk has stated that it is important to rehabilitate this flag, which is often associated with the 1930s National Socialist Movement (NSB), by placing it in a wider historical context regarding its origin during the Dutch Revolt.

The initiation ritual includes three stages: a 'baptismal march,' followed by trials during the rush period, and concluding with a hazing. The association also organizes cantuses and club nights, along with lectures, discussion evenings, and book discussions aimed at ideological development. Campaigns are conducted to promote the association’s ideology.
