= Vlaams Belang Jongeren =

Youth wing of the Vlaams Belang party

Vlaams Belang Jongeren Vlaams Belang Jongeren
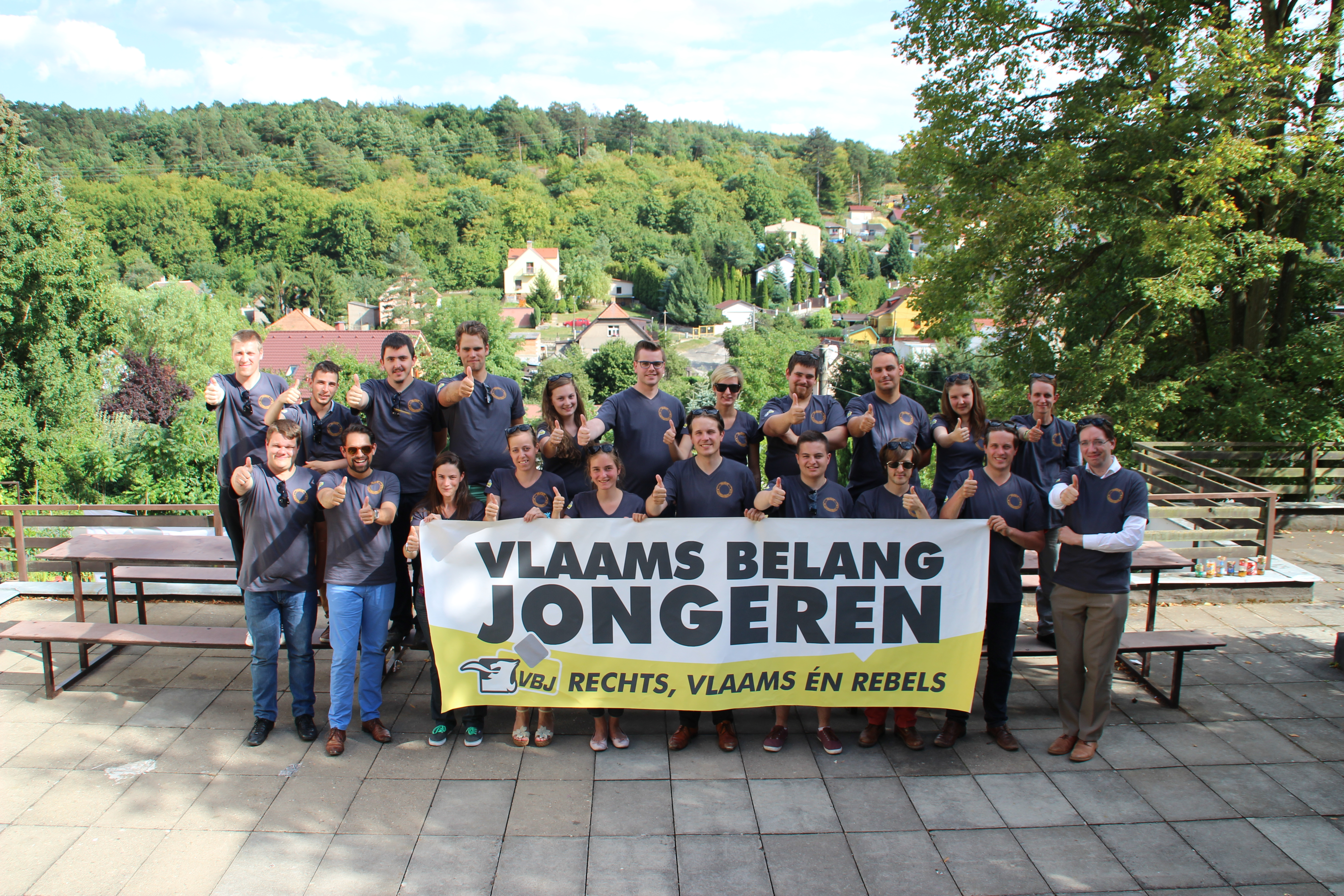
- Summer University of the Flemish Interest Youth league.
- President: Filip Brusselmans
- Founded: 2004
- Headquarters: Brussels, Belgium
- Ideology: Flemish nationalism National conservatism Euroscepticism; Right-wing populism

Vlaams Belang Jongeren (VBJ; Dutch for "Flemish Interest Youth") is the youth wing of the Vlaams Belang party. Until the conviction of the Vlaams Blok in 2004, the organisation was called Vlaams Blok Jongeren. When the party changed its name, so did the youth wing. The current chairwoman of VBJ is Mercina Claesen, who replaced Filip Brusselmans in 2024.

VBJ is a Flemish nationalist and conservative organisation that aims to group youth who want to contribute to the political program of Vlaams Belang. It claims to defend European values and culture. Many of its members also have ties to Flemish nationalist and conservative youth and student organizations such as the Nationalistische Studentenvereniging (NSV) and the Katholiek Vlaams Hoogstudentenverbond (KVHV).

Under the presidency of Tom Van Grieken VBJ was one of the founding members of YEAH or Young European Alliance for Hope. This organisation groups the youth wings of nationalist parties across Europe, such as the Front National de la Jeunesse (youth wing of the Front National), the Movimento Giovanni Padani (youth wing of the Lega Nord) and the Ring Freiheitlicher Jugend (youth wing of the Freiheitliche Partei Österreichs).

== Chairmen of the VBJ ==
- Hans Verreyt (2004–2009)
- Barbara Pas (2009–2011)
- Tom Van Grieken (2011–2014)
- Reccino Van Lommel (2014–2016)
- Bart Claes (2016–2020)
- Filip Brusselmans (2020–2025)
- Mercina Claesen (2025–)
