= Dominion Society of Canada =

Canadian far-right, nationalist and anti-immigration group

- Société du Dominion du Canada (French)
- Formation: 1 July 2025
- Founders: Daniel Tyrie, Greg Wycliffe and Ken Jones
- Type: Non-profit corporation
- Purpose: Canadian nationalism Anti-immigration activism Far-right activism
- Location: Canada
- Field: Political movement Pressure group
- Members: Over 3,000 (self-claimed in July 2026) "Thousands" (per the Canadian Anti-Hate Network in August 2026)
- Chairman: Daniel Tyrie
- Subsidiaries: None
- Website: www.dominionsociety.ca

The Dominion Society of Canada (French: Société du Dominion du Canada) is a Canadian nationalist and anti-immigration group that was founded in 2025.

== History ==
The Dominion Society of Canada was founded on 1 July 2025 by former People's Party of Canada Executive Director Daniel Tyrie, Greg Wycliffe and Ken Jones, and was established as a non-profit corporation on 10 July 2025.

On 16 April 2026, Canadian senator Paula Simons said that the Dominion Society is "now openly calling for campaigns of remigration" during a speech in the Canadian senate about the rise of public racism targeted at immigrants and refugees. This marked the first time that the Dominion Society had been mentioned within a government legislature.

On 26 October 2026, the NATO Association of Canada reported that while the Dominion Society of Canada has not adopted anti-NATO or pro-Russia positions, it is aligned with groups who do such as Alternative for Germany while also having connections to other ethnonationalist groups in Europe such as Restore Britain and the Austrian Identarian Movement. The NATO Association of Canada also reported that the Dominion Society misinterprets statistics and figures published by Statistics Canada in order to push anti-immigration narratives.

=== Membership figures ===
In October 2025, the group was reported by The Canadian Anti-Hate Network to have 1,600 registered members. The Canadian Anti-Hate Network reported that supporters of both the Second Sons and the Dominion Society includes police officers, soldiers of the Canadian Army, personnel of the RCAF, and members of the RCMP. In a July 2026 interview, Tyrie claimed that the group had over 3,000 registered members across Canada. In August 2026, according to Canadian Anti-Hate Network director Evan Balgord, the Dominion Society likely has thousands of members, the majority of which are young white men.

== Goals ==
The Dominion Society describes its mission as promoting Canadian nationalism and immigration reform intended to preserve Canada’s cultural continuity. It promotes the concept of remigration, including policy proposals such as a ten-year moratorium on immigration, revoking temporary visas, restricting birthright citizenship to children of citizens, and cutting social services for non-citizens. It proposes that “economically productive, culturally integrated” permanent residents would be naturalized while others would have their status revoked. It also calls for mass deportations under these rules, as well as incentives for voluntary repatriation.

The Canadian Anti-Hate Network has characterized the Dominion Society as a white nationalist organization, noting that it rejects civic nationalism and views the “nation” as a reflection of the ethnic and cultural characteristics of its Anglo- and Franco-Canadian “founding stock”, groups which CAHN notes are exclusively white. The Canadian Anti-Hate Network also reported the Dominion Society shares membership and discussion spaces with groups such as the Second Sons and is acting as the “political arm” of Canada's white nationalist movement. However, in an emailed statement to The Tyee, Tyrie disputed this characterization. Later on 20 May 2026, Jeremy MacKenzie the founder and leader of the Second Sons denied that he or his group have any connections to the Dominion Society of Canada.

== Activities ==
On 17 October 2025, during a University of Toronto Mississauga campus event by Member of parliament Jamil Jivani as part of his Restore the North tour, several audience members identified themselves as members of the Dominion Society. When the audience members put the idea of Remigration to Jivani he said, "acknowledge it is complicated." Later, on 3 November 2025, Jivani posted a video on Twitter with a speaker who was wearing a Dominion Society pin.

On 17 November 2025, a group of between 10 and 15 people dressed in dark green hoodies gathered above the Ontario Highway 406 overpass in St. Catharines. Some members waved Canadian Red Ensigns and Dominion Society flags while others hung a banner which read, "REMIGRATION NOW."

On 14 December 2025, members of the Dominion Society (including board members Greg Wycliffe and Ken Jones) gathered on the Deerfoot Highway overpass in Calgary. Some members waved the Canadian Red Ensign and held a dominion society banner over the bridge that read "REMIGRATION NOW". The protest was described as the Dominion Society's first showing in Alberta.

On 16 February 2026, Daniel Tyrie was invited to a video podcast interview by Juno News founder Candice Malcolm. During the interview, Tyrie argued that "ethnocultural identity needs to be put at the heart of our immigration policy." At the end of the interview, Malcolm asked Tyrie if he considered himself to be a white nationalist to which Tyrie replied that he considers himself to be a Canadian nationalist. The interview was criticized by former Alberta premier and former immigration minister Jason Kenney. Kenney described Tyrie as a "racist" and described remigration as "Bananas". The interview was also condemned by New Democratic Party MLA Jagrup Brar.

On 18 May 2026 (which was Victoria Day), members of the Dominion Society rallied both Victoria Park and Gore Park in Hamilton, Ontario. The protesters called for a statue of Canada’s first prime minister, Sir John A. Macdonald, to be erected at the site where a monument to him was previously removed in 2021. The protesters also chanted that they would "take our country back." In the aftermath of the rally on 23 May 2026, local anti-racism advocates in Hamilton said that more needed to be done by the city to "combat rising hate," citing the Dominion Society rally on Victoria Day and the rally by Nationalist-13 in late December 2025 which were both held in Gore Park and both called out anti-immigration slogans.

=== DomCon ===
On 29 August 2026, the Dominion Society held its first DomCon conference. According to Dominion Society chairman Daniel Tyrie, tickets for the event sold out by August 22nd, 2026. The event was originally planned to take place in Hamilton, Ontario. Later, it was moved to Burlington, Ontario, after Hamilton Police publicly encouraged venues to consider the impact of hosting the conference. The Justice Centre for Constitutional Freedoms subsequently sent a warning letter to Hamilton Police, arguing that its actions infringed protections for freedom of expression and peaceful assembly.

Austrian far-right activist Martin Sellner was invited to attend DomCon but was denied entry into Canada. Despite being unable to attend in person, Sellner attended and spoke at the event virtually.

Restore Britain spokesman Charlie Downes was invited to attend DomCon. Prior to the event he was detained at the US-Canada border but was later released and attended the convention. British activist and White Papers Policy Institute member Lucy White spoke at Domcon where she presented the WPPI's Canadian Remigration Policy Platform.

Mayor of West Lincoln Cheryl Ganann stated that the Dominion Society would not be permitted to host any events in the town. Mayor of St. Catharines Mat Siscoe condemned DomCon and the Dominion Society and stated that their views are not welcome in St. Catharines. He also urged local businesses to not rent out a space for the Dominion Society. B'nai Brith Canada urged the Canadian government to prevent Martin Sellner from entering the country. The Friends of Fort George announced that Brock's Monument would be closed for the duration of DomCon, citing the need to protect the "safety of its student employees."

Conservative Party MP Andrew Lawton criticized police reaction to the Dominion Society, stating that the actions taken against the Dominion Society amounted to censorship. Former Conservative Party leader Erin O'Toole stated that while he disagrees with the Dominion Society's views, the group should be free to express their views.

==== Counter protests ====
Several counter protests took place across Ontario in response to DomCon. Counter protests in Hamilton, Ontario were organized by Hope Not Hate and included groups such as the Hamilton & District Labour Council, the Hamilton Centre for Civic Inclusion, and the Hamilton Anti-Racism Resource Centre. According to CBC News, more than 100 people attended the counter protest outside of Hamilton city hall.

A counter demonstration took place in Burlington, Ontario outside of The Atrium Banquet and Conference Centre where DomCon was being hosted. Around 30 masked counter protesters took part in the demonstration while several men in suits wearing Dominion Society lanyards stood them down. Officers of the Halton Regional Police Service kept the two groups from engaging each other.

A counter demonstration took place in Peterborough, Ontario in the morning of August 29th. It was organized by Kawarthas United Against Hate and the Peterborough-Nogojiwanong chapter of the International Socialists Canada. Peterborough mayoral candidates Keith Riel, Rob Hailman, and Jacob Méthot were in attendance at the demonstration while council candidates Joy Lachica, Chris Potter, Matt Crowley, Jen Lacey, Ashley Bonner and Charmaine Magumbe also attended the demonstration. Magumbe was the only candidate to give a speech to the crowd while she was at the same time representing the Afrocentric Awareness Network of Peterborough during the protest.
