= Voorpost =

Flemish/Dutch nationalist action group

- Voorpost logo
- Formation: 1976 (Flanders); 1978 (Netherlands)
- Chairman: Bart Vanpachtenbeke
- Action leader Flanders: Nick Van Mieghem
- Action leader Netherlands: Florens van der Kooi
- Website: voorpost.org

Voorpost ("outpost, picket") is an ethno-nationalist (volksnationalist) group founded in Flanders, Belgium, by Karel Dillen in 1976 as a splinter from the Volksunie. Voorpost pursues the irredentist ideal of a Greater Netherlands, a nation state that would unite all Dutch-speaking territories in Europe. It is active in Belgium, the Netherlands and South Africa. The organisation has staged rallies on various topics, against Islam, leftist organizations, drugs, and socialism.

Members include Vlaams Blok ideologue Roeland Raes and Vlaams Belang politician Luc Vermeulen. Bart Vanpachtenbeke is the leader of Voorpost (succeeding Johan Vanslamsbrouck). As of 2013 Nick van Mieghem is action leader for Flanders, replacing Luc Vermeulen. Florens van der Kooi (formerly of the NNP) is action leader for the Netherlands. Several members of the organisation were also members of the VMO (Vlaamse Militanten Orde), which was banned in 1983 due to several violent attacks against immigrants, Belgian French-speakers, and left-leaning organisations.

The Dutch AIVD classified the group as far-right. It also concluded it does not have anti-democratic goals nor uses anti-democratic means. In 1986, the Dutch labour union FNV and the Anne Frank Foundation made a list of groups it considered racist and fascist, which included Voorpost. Because of this members of Voorpost were barred from joining the FNV. A Dutch court ruled in 2012 this ban on Voorpost members was against the law as discrimination based on political opinion is illegal in the Netherlands.
