= Nationalistische Studentenvereniging =

Flemish nationalist student association

NSV! Nationalistische Studentenvereniging
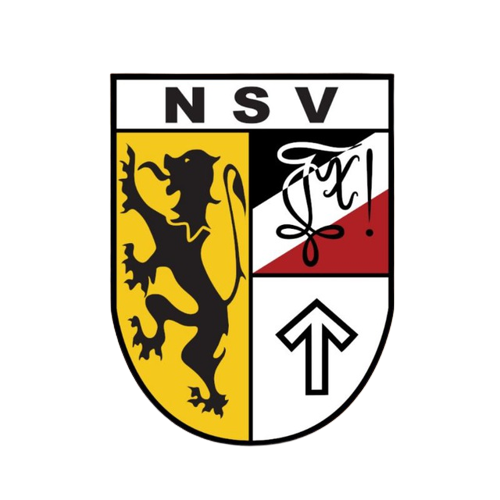
- Founded: 1976 (50 years ago)
- Split from: KVHV
- Ideology: Flemish nationalism; National conservatism; Anti-immigration; Remigration
- Position: Far-right
- Colours: Black, white and red
- Magazine: Branding
- Website: https://nsv.be/

The Nationalistische Studentenvereniging (NSV!) (transl. "Nationalist Student Association") is a far-right Flemish nationalist student association, with chapters in Antwerp, Brussels, Ghent, Leuven, West Flanders (including Bruges, Roeselare, Ostend and Kortrijk), Hasselt and Mechelen.

== History ==
The NSV was founded in 1976 by Edwin Truyens as a radical splinter group of the Katholiek Vlaams Hoogstudentenverbond (KVHV; "Catholic Flemish Student Association"). This split occurred after the national council of the KVHV resented the radical Flemish nationalist stances of Truyens and his faction, including accepting nothing less than full Flemish independence.

In 2024, the student union had their recognition rescinded and were banned from using KU Leuven facilities after a speaker the NSV invited used racist language during a lecture. The group has also received a suspension from the University of Ghent for discriminatory behavior.

== Ideology ==
The NSV maintains an ideology of conservative, radical nationalism and is active in the Flemish Movement. Many top figures in the Vlaams Belang (formerly Vlaams Blok) started their political activities in the NSV, although the organization claims party-political independence. They also have close ties to other grassroots organisations in the Flemish independence movement like the Vlaamse Volksbeweging (VVB) and Voorpost. Smaller numbers of former NSV members have also been elected to office for the newer and more moderate New Flemish Alliance party.

Internationally the NSV maintains informal relations with several European nationalist organizations, such as Generation Identity, the Movimento Giovani Padani and the publishing house Arktos.

== Colours and symbols ==
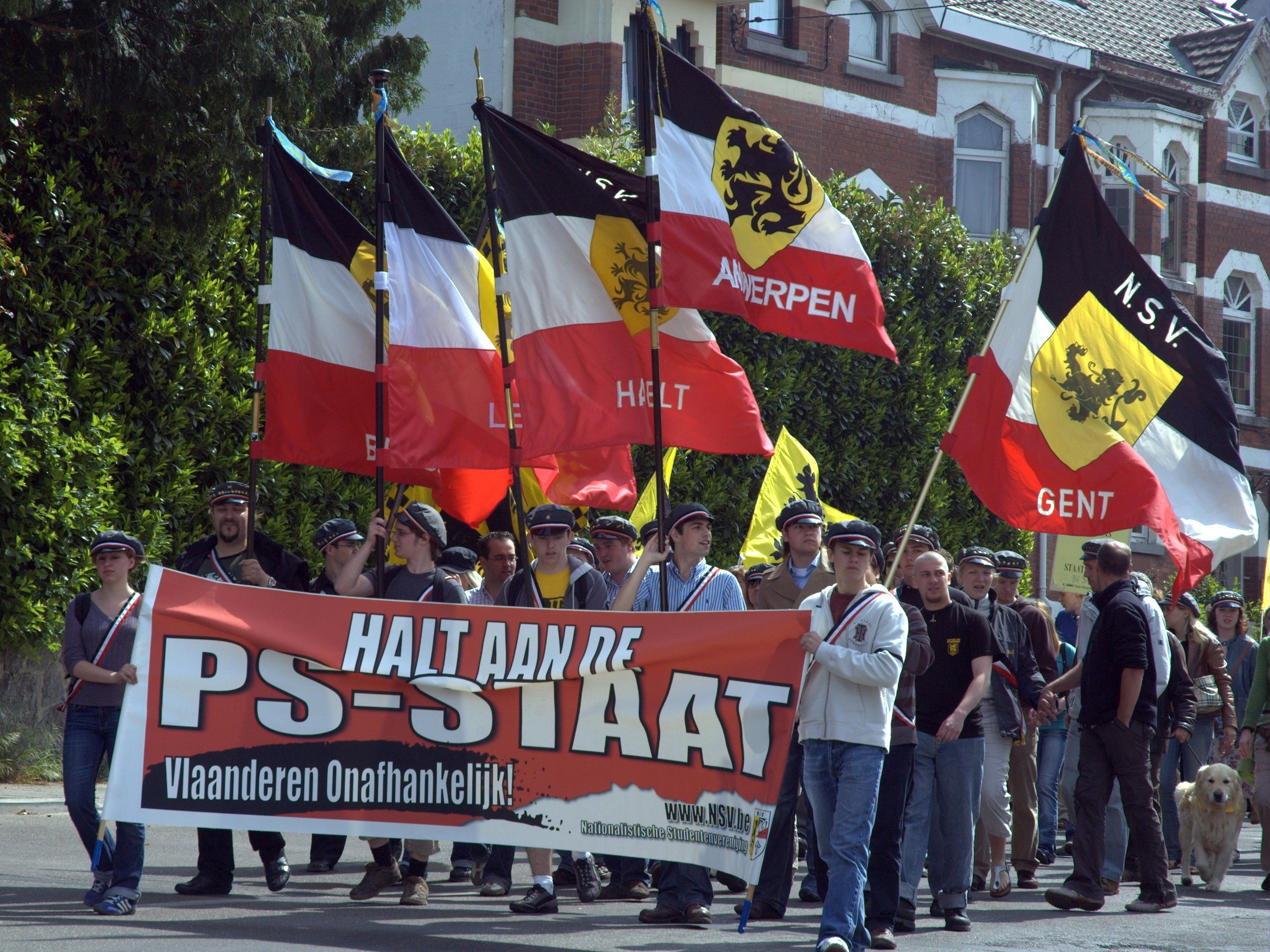
NSV protesting the 2007 government formation

Members of the NSV can be recognised by their grey student's hat and ribbons (the German-originating Couleur tradition). The colours of their ribbons and student's hats are black-white-red. The black relates to the Flemish flag, and white and red are the heraldic colours of Antwerp, the city where the NSV was founded. These were initially the colours of KVHV Antwerp, but after the split, NSV took on the black-white-red and KVHV Antwerp adopted the Prince's Flag.

NSV has been accused of using far-right imagery, such as the tyr-rune (an Armanen rune) and a flag bearing the same colors as that of the German Reich. People have also repeatedly given Nazi salutes at NSV protests.

== Notable (former) members of the NSV ==
- Frank Vanhecke (president of Vlaams Belang from 1996–2008)
- Bruno Valkeniers (president of Vlaams Belang from 2008–2012)
- Tom Van Grieken (president of Vlaams Belang since 2014)
- Filip Dewinter (leading member of Vlaams Belang)

== See also ==
- Nationalistisch Jong Studenten Verbond ("Nationalist Young Students Association"): An affiliated organization with similar ideological profile for secondary school students between 15 and 18 years old
- Voorpost ("Frontline"): A far-right (Diets) organization that works in close cooperation with the NSV
- Katholiek Vlaams Hoogstudentenverbond ("Catholic Flemish Student Association"): a Roman Catholic and conservative Flemish nationalist student society that is active in Flemish universities, from which the NSV split
- Groot-Nederlandse Studentenvereniging ("Greater Netherlands Student Association"): Student association in the Netherlands modeled after and working closely with the NSV!
