= 2023 Potsdam far-right meeting =

Meeting about deporting people from Germany

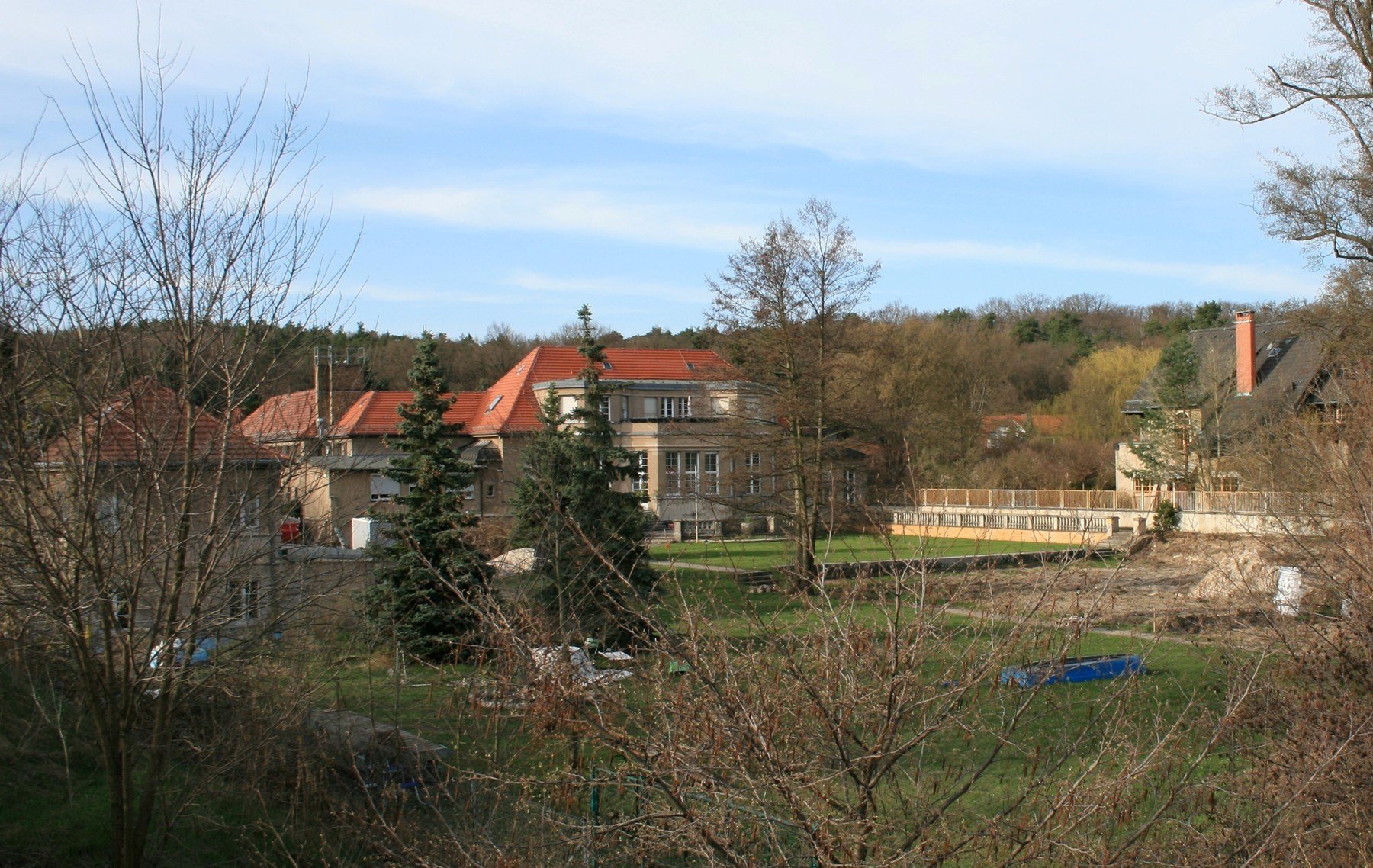
- Adlon Mansion at Lake Lehnitz (2013)
- Date: 25 November 2023
- Venue: Adlon Mansion
- Location: Potsdam, Brandenburg, Germany; 52.4425°N 13.0485°E
- Motive: Establish a plan on remigration of asylum seekers, foreigners, and foreign-born German citizens
- Reporter: Correctiv
- Organized by: Gernot Mörig; Hans-Christian Limmer
- Participants: Identitarian movement members; Alternative for Germany members (partial, disavowed); Christian Democratic Union members (partial, disavowed); Other German far-right activists

On 25 November 2023, a group of mostly right-wing extremists met at the Adlon Mansion on Lake Lehnitz in Potsdam, Germany. At the event, Austrian activist Martin Sellner presented a plan for the deportation (called "remigration" by Sellner) of certain parts of the German populace, namely asylum seekers, foreigners with a residence permit, and "non-assimilated" German citizens. The meeting was attended by members of the far-right and right-wing populist party Alternative for Germany (AfD), the mainstream centre-right party Christian Democratic Union (CDU), the Werteunion (a German conservative political association), and the far-right Identitarian movement, among others. The meeting was exposed by the investigative journalism organization Correctiv, which published its findings on 10 January 2024.

Both the revelations regarding the content of the meeting and the networking between the AfD and other right-wing extremists led to a broad wave of outrage and horror among numerous representatives from German politics, business, and culture. In many German cities, tens of thousands of people protested against the plans discussed at the meeting. What followed was a debate about a possible ban of the AfD and party expulsions of members of the CDU that attended the meeting.

Some participants of the Potsdam meeting mounted lawsuits against the report. In February 2024, Ulrich Vosgerau achieved a partial success, with a court deciding in his favour in one of three points, which however did not concern the core statements of the report. In January 2025, two new legal challenges were launched by participants.

== Meeting ==
Gernot Mörig and Hans-Christian Limmer had invited the guests; Limmer did not attend. Mörig was a former leader of the Freibund, a German youth association associated with the German alt-right movement, before becoming head of the neo-Nazi German Patriotic Youth (Heimattreue Deutsche Jugend; HDJ). Limmer is a former advisor of the Roland Berger consulting firm, who is best known for the 2002 takeover of the BackWerk bakery chain and his investments in the system catering companies Hans im Glück and Pottsalat. The invitation to the meeting announced a "Masterplan" and a speech by Martin Sellner. Participants were also required to donate at least €5,000. The meeting was supposed to stay secret, but Correctiv was able to get a copy of the invitation. With the aid of anonymous sources as well as video footage from inside the hotel, Correctiv successfully reconstructed the contents of the meeting.

According to Correctiv, the 22 attendees included the following:

- Martin Sellner, Austrian right-wing extremist and former speaker of the Austrian Identitarian movement
- Roland Hartwig, former member of the German parliament for the AfD, and personal advisor to AfD chairwoman Alice Weidel at the time of the event
- Gerrit Huy, AfD member of the German parliament
- Ulrich Siegmund, Chairman of the AfD faction in the state parliament of Saxony-Anhalt
- Tim Krause, speaker of the AfD faction in the state parliament of Brandenburg and vice chairman of the AfD district association Potsdam-Mittelmark
- Ulrich Vosgerau, member of the CDU and the board of trustees of the AfD-affiliated Desiderius-Erasmus-Stiftung
- Mario Müller, member of the Identitarian movement and research assistant to the AfD member of parliament Jan Wenzel Schmidt
- Alexander von Bismarck, member of the CDU and former mayor of Insel
- Simone Baum, member of the CDU and chairperson of the North Rhine-Westphalia (NRW) branch of the Werteunion
- Michaela Schneider, member of the CDU and vice chairperson of the North Rhine-Westphalia (NRW) branch of the Werteunion
- Silke Schröder, a member of the board of directors of the Verein Deutsche Sprache at the time of the event, and a columnist in the conservative publication Deutschland-Kurier, who also worked with the Austrian far-right media platform AUF1.
- Henning Pless, right-wing extremist alternative medicine practitioner from Kiel
- Gernot Mörig, a former personal assistant of Peter Kurth (CDU), the former president of the Federal Association of German Waste Disposal, Water - and Raw Material Economy, alongside his wife Astrid Mörig and son Arne Friedrich Mörig
- Wilhelm Wilderink (CDU) and Mathilda Huss, the hotel operators of the Adlon mansion
- Hans-Ulrich Kopp, an entrepreneur, publisher and founder of Lepanto Verlag
- Erik Ahrens, political activist classified as belonging to the right-wing extremist scene by state-level security authorities, and known for his part in the success of AfD-affiliated accounts on TikTok, such as that of Maximilian Krah
- Christoph Hofer, an IT entrepreneur
- Two clerks, one member of the Identitarian movement, and a doctor

Days after the uncovering by Correctiv, news reports based on work by another collective stated that the meeting may already have been the seventh of its kind; a draft letter by Mörig purportedly thanked AfD chairman Tino Chrupalla for his participation in a 2021 meeting described as the fifth, with a sixth planned the following year. While Chrupalla refused to comment, his participation in the fifth meeting was confirmed by other AfD members.

== Master plan ==
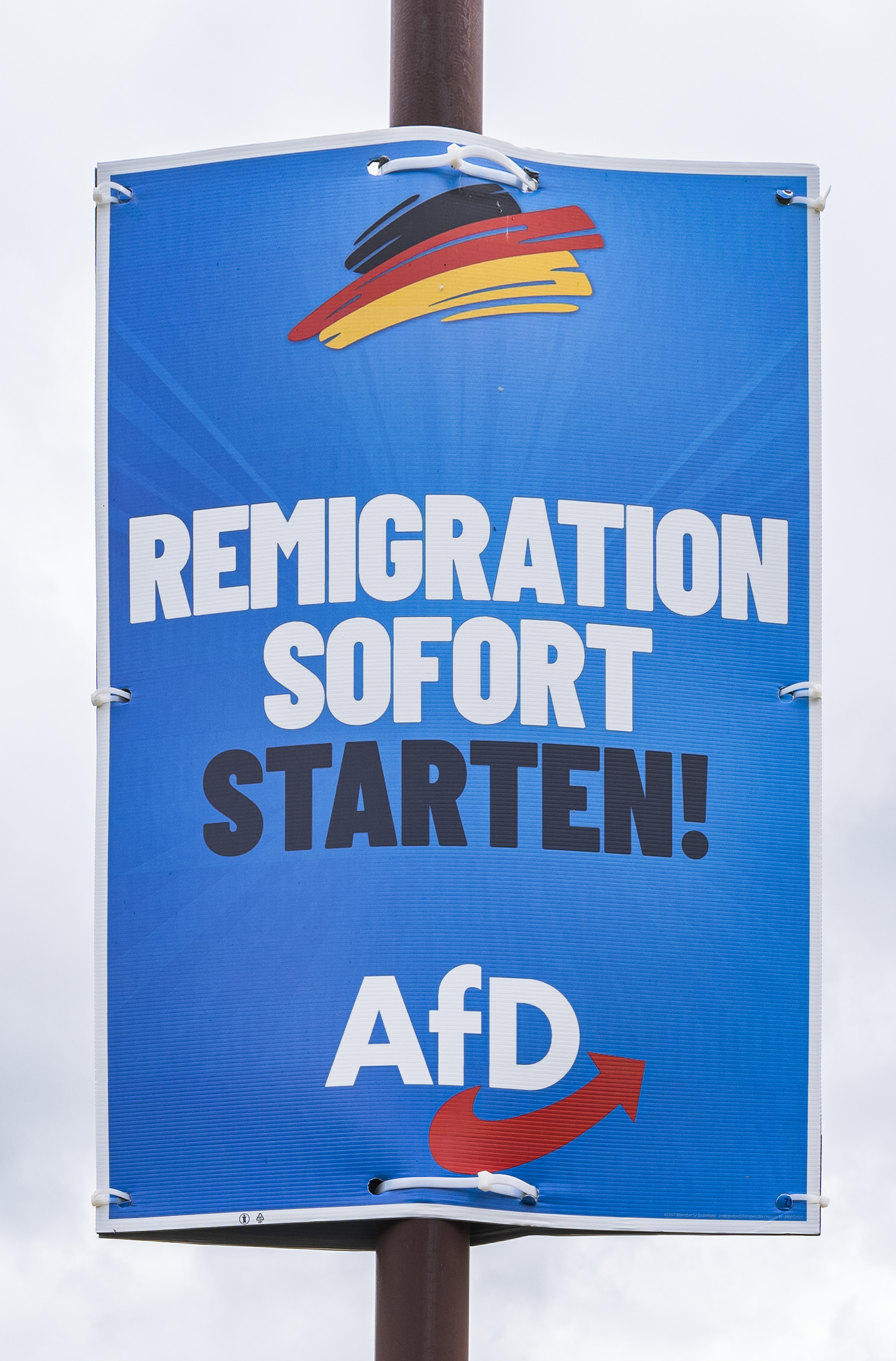
Election poster of the AfD Thuringia supporting remigration (2024)

Sellner's "master plan for remigration" would entail the relocation of three groups of people from Germany: asylum seekers, foreigners with the right to stay, and "non-assimilated" German citizens. According to Sellner, "tailor-made laws" would have to be used to exert pressure on such residents to assimilate, in order to persuade them to leave the country. The plan is intended to be a "decades[-long] project". Sellner also brought up the idea of a "model state" in North Africa, where up to two million people could be "moved to" and the refugee helpers could follow them.

In this context, Sellner discussed the concept of "ethnic elections" since, according to him, people with a history of migration tend to vote for "migration-friendly" parties. The report by Correctiv notes that this argument by Sellner, if it were realized, would cast doubt on about 20 million people's right to vote. The discussed magnitude of millions of people makes it clear as to why some media outlets used the term "deportation plan" to refer the master plan in their reports. Sellner wrote to the news agency dpa that the plan envisioned a special economic zone in North Africa, which would be leased and organized as a model city. The plan included "not only deportations, but also local help, a dominant culture, and pressure to assimilate." According to Ulrich Siegmund, foreign restaurants should disappear from the streetscape, and it should become "unattractive" for the clients of such establishments to live in Saxony-Anhalt.

There was allegedly no criticism of the plan among the participants, but, rather, doubts as to whether it could be implemented. The panel stated that in order to realize the proposed remigration plan, pre-political power should be built up. Money was to be invested in influencer projects, propaganda and campaigns to change the "climate of opinion". According to Correctiv, there was talk of discrediting the Federal Constitutional Court of Germany, casting doubt on democratic elections, and fighting the public media. There were also discussions about influencing young people on social media with content that would be perceived as "normal political theses".

The plan of a "remigration through displacement" is not a new idea. In his book Nie zweimal in denselben Fluss ("Never into the same River twice"), published in 2018, Björn Höcke called for a cleansing of "culture-foreign" people in Germany.

Correctiv's reporting of an alleged "master plan" was mostly suggestive and the organisation had to admit in several court cases in the following years that no deportation of German citizens had been discussed. Martin Sellner had exclusively advertised the removal of asylum seekers and other foreigners to 18 listeners. On 19 December 2025 a Hamburg court found the "master plan" reporting acceptable nonetheless. It concluded Correctiv did not report facts but was writing an opinion piece. Commentator Elke Bodderas wrote, that with the court ignoring the consequences of Correctiv's opinion piece, the deliberately imprecise piece of work, with its murmuring tone, helped Correctiv to survive the case.

== Reactions ==
The revelations resulted in mass protests throughout Germany and calls for the AfD to be banned. Groups of thousands of protestors gathered in several German cities, with roughly 100,000 in Munich alone on the weekend of 20 January. Some sources have reported that up to 1.4 million people were involved in the protests in the period 19–21 January.

The AfD dropped slightly in two polls 10 days after the protests commenced, with slippage continuing through February, where its standing has since remained. In Austria, the FPÖ scored losses in polls conducted by three different institutes in the period from 12 to 18 January 2024, but retained the lead.

== See also ==
- Wannsee Conference – 1942 Nazi meeting to plan the Holocaust
