= Save Europe Act =

European anti-immigration campaign launched in 2026

- Formation: 31 May 2026
- Founders: Eva Vlaardingerbroek, Martin Sellner
- Type: Political campaign
- Purpose: European Citizens' Initiative concerning immigration and asylum policy
- Region served: European Union
- Website: www.save-europe-act.com

The Save Europe Act is a far-right European anti-immigration campaign launched in 2026 that sought to establish European Union legislation on immigration and asylum policy. The campaign is led by the far-right Dutch political commentator Eva Vlaardingerbroek and far-right Austrian activist Martin Sellner.

The campaign proposed a moratorium on new immigration routes from non-Western countries, citing a need for the "ethnic and cultural continuity" of the "native peoples of Europe", in the face of what they described as "demographic exchanges" by "non-Western" and "non-European" peoples. It has been described as advocating the forcible expulsion of "unintegrated" non-European migrants to their countries of origin.

== Legal process ==
The campain seeks to establish its goals through the European Citizens' Initiative mechanism that allows citizens of the European Union with a minimum number of nationals from at least seven member states, to call directly on the European Commission to propose a legal act.

In July 2026, the European Commission ruled that the proposal did not meet the legal criteria required under the European Citizens' Initiative Regulation, stating that is was contrary to Article II of the Treaty on European Union and the Charter of Fundamental Rights of the European Union.

The organisers responded by stating that they intened to challenge the decision in the Court of Justice of the European Union.

== See also ==
- Immigration to the European Union
- Common European Asylum System
