= Sellner =

Sellner may refer to:

- Brittany Sellner (born 1992), American author and influencer
- Martin Sellner (born 1989), Austrian Identitarian leader
- Rudolf Sellner (1905–1990), German actor, dramaturge, stage director and intendant
