= Alexander Markovics =

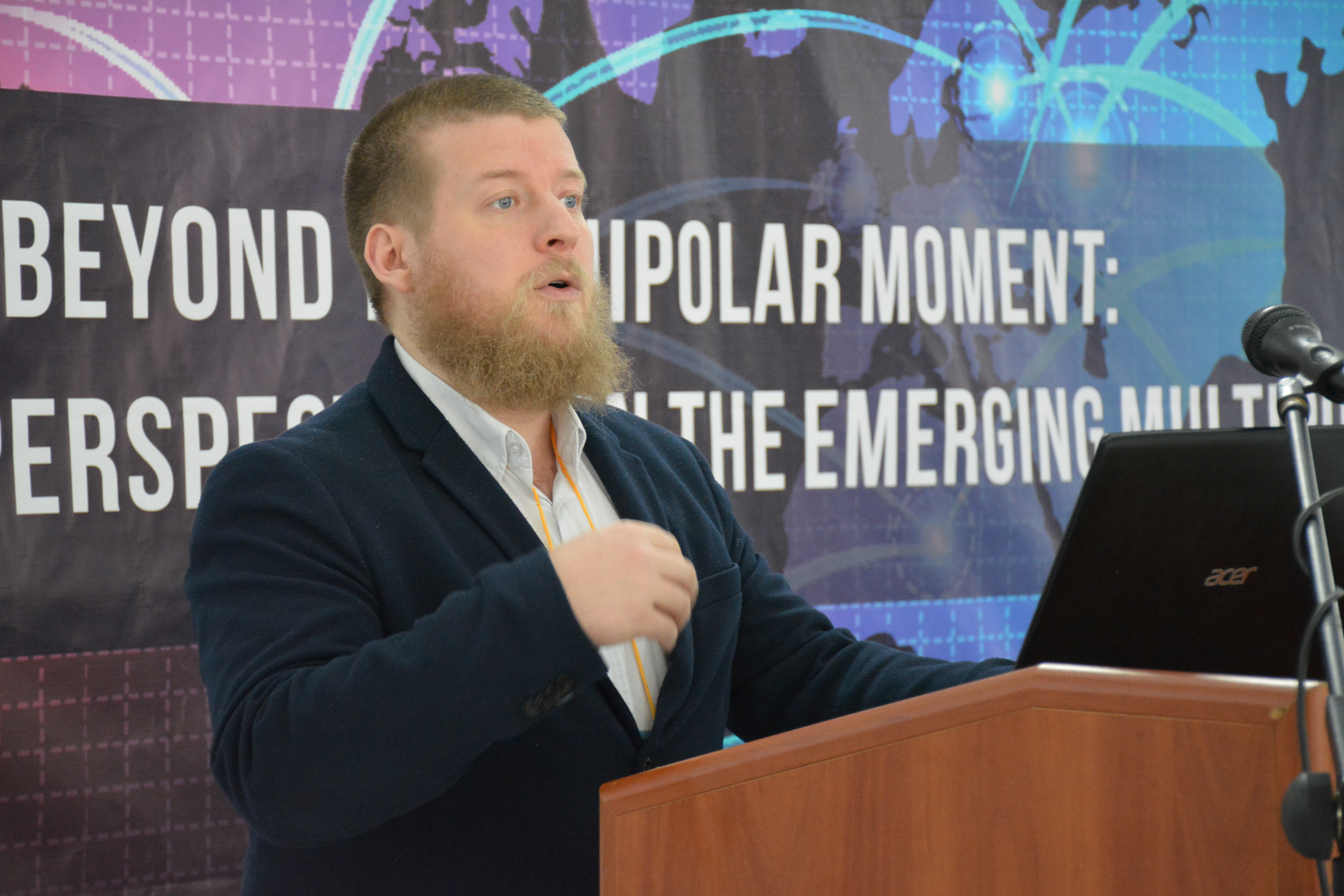
In 2019

Alexander Markovics (born 9 May 1991 in Vienna) is an Austrian historian, publicist and activist of the Neue Rechten. He co-founded the far-right organization Identitäre Bewegung Österreich, which he headed from 2013 to 2015. In 2019, he became general secretary and press spokesman of the Vienna Suworow-Institut, Gesellschaft zur Förderung des Österreichisch-Russischen Dialogs. (lit. Society for the Promotion of Austrian-Russian Dialogue) He regularly publishes in the Deutsche Stimme, which is the far-right party Die Heimat's party newspaper.
