= Gerrit Huy =

German politician (born 1953)

Member of the Bundestag
- Incumbent
- Assumed office 2021

Personal details
- Born: Rose Gerrit Huy; 13 May 1953 (age 73) Braunschweig, West Germany
- Party: Alternative for Germany

Gerrit Huy (born 13 May 1953) is a German right-wing politician of the Alternative for Germany (AfD) and a former business executive. She has been a member of the Bundestag since 2021.

== Life and politics ==
Huy was born in 1953 in the West German city of Braunschweig. She studied at the John F. Kennedy School of Government at Harvard University on a scholarship. During a discussion there, she caught the eye of Edzard Reuter, who brought her into the Daimler-Benz group as his personal assistant in 1986. From April 1997, Huy served for eleven months as the first female member of the board of directors of Daimler-Benz.

Huy joined the AfD in 2017, stating that the refugee policy of the federal government at the time was too liberal for her. She was elected to the Bundestag in 2021 via fifth place on the Bavarian state list and primarily represents the Weilheim constituency (which also includes Garmisch-Partenkirchen and Landsberg am Lech). In 2025 she was re-elected.

On 25 November 2023, Huy attended a meeting at the Landhaus Adlon in Potsdam together with other AfD members, CDU politicians, business figures, and far-right activists, including Martin Sellner, leader of the Identitarian Movement of Austria. The Correctiv research network reported in January 2024 that Sellner had presented a "master plan" at the meeting for the "remigration" of migrants and their descendants, including German citizens of migrant background; the report triggered mass protests against the AfD.

In December 2025, the Hamburg Regional Court dismissed a suit against Correctiv, treating the term "master plan" as protected opinion. In March 2026, the Berlin Regional Court II ruled that Correctiv's central claim — that the meeting concerned a plan to expel German citizens — was substantially untrue; Correctiv is appealing. Huy told the ARD-Hauptstadtstudio that nothing noteworthy had taken place at the meeting and that she had not previously known Sellner or been aware he would attend.

Huy repeatedly criticizes the Bürgergeld (citizen’s benefit) as "disincentivizing work." She argues that standard increases intended to offset inflation create "perverse incentives" that make it difficult for companies to recruit labor. She also advocates for excluding foreign nationals from receiving the Bürgergeld; according to her, migrants should only become eligible for the benefit after having contributed to the social security system for 10 years.
