= Weilheim (electoral district) =

Federal electoral district of Germany

225 Weilheim
- Electoral district for the Bundestag
- Weilheim in 2025
- State: Bavaria
- Population: 223,900 (2019)
- Electorate: 168,473 (2021)
- Major settlements: Weilheim in Oberbayern; Penzberg; Schongau
- Area: 1,978.5 km^{2}

Current electoral district
- Created: 1949
- Party: CSU
- Member: Alexander Dobrindt
- Elected: 2002, 2005, 2009, 2013, 2017, 2021, 2025

Weilheim is an electoral constituency (German: Wahlkreis) represented in the Bundestag. It elects one member via first-past-the-post voting. Under the current constituency numbering system, it is designated as constituency 225. It is located in southwestern Bavaria, comprising the districts of Garmisch-Partenkirchen and Weilheim-Schongau.

Weilheim was created for the inaugural 1949 federal election. Since 2002, it has been represented by Alexander Dobrindt of the Christian Social Union (CSU).

== Geography ==
Weilheim is located in southern Bavaria. As of the 2021 federal election, it comprises the districts of Garmisch-Partenkirchen and Weilheim-Schongau.

== History ==
Weilheim was created in 1949. In the 1949 election, it was Bavaria constituency 12 in the numbering system. In the 1953 through 1961 elections, it was number 207. In the 1965 through 1998 elections, it was number 212. In the 2002 and 2005 elections, it was number 227. In the 2009 through 2021 elections, it was number 226. From the 2025 election, it has been number 225.

Originally, the constituency comprised the districts of Bad Tölz, Garmisch-Partenkirchen, Schongau, and Weilheim. In the 1976 election, it comprised the districts of Bad Tölz-Wolfratshausen, Garmisch-Partenkirchen, and Weilheim-Schongau. In the 1980 through 2013 elections, it comprised the districts of Garmisch-Partenkirchen, Landsberg, and Weilheim-Schongau. It acquired its current borders in the 2017 election.

| Election | No. | Name | Borders |
|---|---|---|---|
| 1949 | 12 | Weilheim | Bad Tölz district; Garmisch-Partenkirchen district; Schongau district; Weilheim district |
| 1953 | 207 | Weilheim | Bad Tölz district; Garmisch-Partenkirchen district; Schongau district; Weilheim district |
| 1957 | 207 | Weilheim | Bad Tölz district; Garmisch-Partenkirchen district; Schongau district; Weilheim district |
| 1961 | 207 | Weilheim | Bad Tölz district; Garmisch-Partenkirchen district; Schongau district; Weilheim district |
| 1965 | 212 | Weilheim | Bad Tölz district; Garmisch-Partenkirchen district; Schongau district; Weilheim district |
| 1969 | 212 | Weilheim | Bad Tölz district; Garmisch-Partenkirchen district; Schongau district; Weilheim district |
| 1972 | 212 | Weilheim | Bad Tölz district; Garmisch-Partenkirchen district; Schongau district; Weilheim district |
| 1976 | 212 | Weilheim | Bad Tölz-Wolfratshausen district; Garmisch-Partenkirchen district; Weilheim-Schongau district |
| 1980 | 212 | Weilheim | Garmisch-Partenkirchen district; Landsberg district; Weilheim-Schongau district |
| 1983 | 212 | Weilheim | Garmisch-Partenkirchen district; Landsberg district; Weilheim-Schongau district |
| 1987 | 212 | Weilheim | Garmisch-Partenkirchen district; Landsberg district; Weilheim-Schongau district |
| 1990 | 212 | Weilheim | Garmisch-Partenkirchen district; Landsberg district; Weilheim-Schongau district |
| 1994 | 212 | Weilheim | Garmisch-Partenkirchen district; Landsberg district; Weilheim-Schongau district |
| 1998 | 212 | Weilheim | Garmisch-Partenkirchen district; Landsberg district; Weilheim-Schongau district |
| 2002 | 227 | Weilheim | Garmisch-Partenkirchen district; Landsberg district; Weilheim-Schongau district |
| 2005 | 227 | Weilheim | Garmisch-Partenkirchen district; Landsberg district; Weilheim-Schongau district |
| 2009 | 226 | Weilheim | Garmisch-Partenkirchen district; Landsberg district; Weilheim-Schongau district |
| 2013 | 226 | Weilheim | Garmisch-Partenkirchen district; Landsberg district; Weilheim-Schongau district |
| 2017 | 226 | Weilheim | Garmisch-Partenkirchen district; Weilheim-Schongau district |
| 2021 | 226 | Weilheim | Garmisch-Partenkirchen district; Weilheim-Schongau district |
| 2025 | 225 | Weilheim | Garmisch-Partenkirchen district; Weilheim-Schongau district |

== Members ==
Like most constituencies in rural Bavaria, it is an CSU safe seat, the party holding the seat continuously since its creation. It was first represented by long-time CSU leader Franz Josef Strauss from 1949 to 1987, a total of ten consecutive terms; however, he resigned from the Bundestag in 1978 to become Minister-President of Bavaria, and subsequently turned down his Bundestag mandate after the 1980 and 1983 elections. He was succeeded by Michaela Geiger, who was representative from 1987 to 2002. Alexander Dobrindt was elected in 2002, and re-elected in 2005, 2009, 2013, 2017, 2021 and 2025.

| Election | Member | Party | % |
|---|---|---|---|
| 1949 | Franz Josef Strauss | CSU | 28.8 |
| 1953 | Franz Josef Strauss | CSU | 52.3 |
| 1957 | Franz Josef Strauss | CSU | 57.6 |
| 1961 | Franz Josef Strauss | CSU | 57.7 |
| 1965 | Franz Josef Strauss | CSU | 58.9 |
| 1969 | Franz Josef Strauss | CSU | 62.0 |
| 1972 | Franz Josef Strauss | CSU | 62.3 |
| 1976 | Franz Josef Strauss | CSU | 66.3 |
| 1980 | Franz Josef Strauss | CSU | 65.4 |
| 1983 | Franz Josef Strauss | CSU | 68.8 |
| 1987 | Michaela Geiger | CSU | 67.1 |
| 1990 | Michaela Geiger | CSU | 61.8 |
| 1994 | Michaela Geiger | CSU | 62.0 |
| 1998 | Michaela Geiger | CSU | 58.0 |
| 2002 | Alexander Dobrindt | CSU | 63.5 |
| 2005 | Alexander Dobrindt | CSU | 59.4 |
| 2009 | Alexander Dobrindt | CSU | 52.0 |
| 2013 | Alexander Dobrindt | CSU | 57.2 |
| 2017 | Alexander Dobrindt | CSU | 47.9 |
| 2021 | Alexander Dobrindt | CSU | 41.9 |
| 2025 | Alexander Dobrindt | CSU | 45.8 |

== Election results ==
=== 2025 election ===
Federal election (2025): Weilheim
| Notes: | Blue background denotes the winner of the electorate vote. Pink background denotes a candidate elected from their party list. Yellow background denotes an electorate win by a list member, or other incumbent. A ✓ or ✗ denotes status of any incumbent, win or lose respectively. | | | | | | |
| Party | Candidate | Votes | % | ±% | Party votes | % | ±% |
|---|---|---|---|---|---|---|---|
| CSU | ✓ Alexander Dobrindt | 65.407 | 45.8 | ▲3.9 | 59,685 | 41.6 | ▲6.5 |
| AfD | Gerrit Huy | 22.082 | 15.5 | ▲8.4 | 24,240 | 16.9 | ▲9.0 |
| Greens | Christian King | 18,129 | 12.7 | ▲0.8 | 17,098 | 11.9 | ▼1.5 |
| SPD | Clemens Meikis | 13,488 | 9.4 | ▼5.0 | 13,888 | 9.7 | ▼4.8 |
| Left | Robert Wilska | 5,698 | 4.0 | ▲2.0 | 6,870 | 4.8 | ▲2.5 |
| FDP | Jürgen Speer | 6,356 | 4.4 | ▼1.8 | 6,760 | 4.7 | ▼5.7 |
| FW | Michael Marksteiner | 8,023 | 5.6 | ▼1.8 | 6,333 | 4.4 | ▼3.9 |
| ÖDP | Gwendolin Simple | 2,331 | 1.6 | ▼1.4 | 963 | 0.7 | ▼0.6 |
| Volt | Joachim Nibbe | 1,400 | 1.0 | ▲0.6 | 692 | 0.5 | ▲0.2 |
| dieBasis | | | | ▼3.1 | 587 | 0.4 | ▼2.3 |
| BP | | | | ▼1.8 | 301 | 0.2 | ▼0.7 |
| Tierschutzpartei | | | | | 1,012 | 0.7 | ▼0.3 |
| PARTEI | | | | | 667 | 0.5 | ▼0.2 |
| Pirates | | | | | | | ▼0.3 |
| BSW | | | | | 4,016 | 2.8 | |
| Team Todenhöfer | | | | | | | ▼0.2 |
| Unabhängige | | | | | | | ▼0.5 |
| Gesundheitsforschung | | | | | | | ▼0.01 |
| Bündnis C | | | | | | | ▼0.1 |
| Humanists | | | | | 82 | 0.1 | 0.0 |
| BD | | | | | 118 | 0.1 | |
| MLPD | | | | | 15 | 0.0 | 0.0 |
| Informal votes | | 801 | | | 388 | | |
| Total valid votes | | 142,914 | | | 143,327 | | |
| Turnout | | 143,715 | 85.4 | ▲3.5 | | | |
| CSU hold | Majority | | | ▼3.5 | | | |

=== 2021 election ===
Federal election (2021): Weilheim
| Notes: | Blue background denotes the winner of the electorate vote. Pink background denotes a candidate elected from their party list. Yellow background denotes an electorate win by a list member, or other incumbent. A ✓ or ✗ denotes status of any incumbent, win or lose respectively. | | | | | | |
| Party | Candidate | Votes | % | ±% | Party votes | % | ±% |
|---|---|---|---|---|---|---|---|
| CSU | ✓ Alexander Dobrindt | 57,179 | 41.9 | ▼6.1 | 48,178 | 35.1 | ▼7.7 |
| SPD | Sigrid Meierhofer | 19,682 | 14.4 | ▼0.4 | 19,927 | 14.5 | ▲3.0 |
| Greens | Elisabeth Löwenbourg-Brzezinski | 16,300 | 11.9 | ▲2.9 | 18,397 | 13.4 | ▲3.9 |
| FW | Arnold-Günther Reuss | 10,100 | 7.4 | | 11,462 | 8.4 | ▲6.2 |
| AfD | Gerrit Huy | 9,686 | 7.1 | ▼3.0 | 10,873 | 7.9 | ▼4.2 |
| FDP | Karl Sielmann | 8,553 | 6.3 | ▼0.8 | 14,311 | 10.4 | 0.0 |
| dieBasis | Juina Wessel | 4,301 | 3.1 | | 3,717 | 2.7 | |
| ÖDP | Maiken Winter | 4,205 | 3.1 | ▼0.4 | 1,737 | 1.3 | ▼0.3 |
| Left | Rolf Walther | 2,718 | 2.0 | ▼2.7 | 3,124 | 2.3 | ▼3.1 |
| Tierschutzpartei | | | | | 1,316 | 1.0 | ▲0.1 |
| BP | Johann Gattinger | 2,405 | 1.8 | ▼1.1 | 1,229 | 0.9 | ▼0.8 |
| Independent | Ricard Ryssel | 966 | 0.7 | | | | |
| PARTEI | | | | | 905 | 0.7 | ▲0.1 |
| Pirates | | | | | 375 | 0.3 | 0.0 |
| Volt | Werner Knigge | 500 | 0.4 | | 339 | 0.2 | |
| Team Todenhöfer | | | | | 296 | 0.2 | |
| Unabhängige | | | | | 256 | 0.2 | |
| Gesundheitsforschung | | | | | 136 | 0.1 | 0.0 |
| V-Partei3 | | | | | 120 | 0.1 | ▼0.1 |
| Bündnis C | | | | | 85 | 0.1 | |
| Humanists | | | | | 83 | 0.1 | |
| du. | | | | | 76 | 0.1 | |
| NPD | | | | | 67 | 0.0 | ▼0.1 |
| The III. Path | | | | | 61 | 0.0 | |
| DKP | | | | | 48 | 0.0 | 0.0 |
| LKR | | | | | 27 | 0.0 | |
| MLPD | | | | | 15 | 0.0 | 0.0 |
| Informal votes | | 1,444 | | | 879 | | |
| Total valid votes | | 136,595 | | | 137,160 | | |
| Turnout | | 138,039 | 81.9 | ▲1.6 | | | |
| CSU hold | Majority | 37,497 | 27.5 | ▼5.7 | | | |

=== 2017 election ===
Federal election (2017): Weilheim
| Notes: | Blue background denotes the winner of the electorate vote. Pink background denotes a candidate elected from their party list. Yellow background denotes an electorate win by a list member, or other incumbent. A ✓ or ✗ denotes status of any incumbent, win or lose respectively. | | | | | | |
| Party | Candidate | Votes | % | ±% | Party votes | % | ±% |
|---|---|---|---|---|---|---|---|
| CSU | ✓ Alexander Dobrindt | 63,784 | 47.9 | ▼9.5 | 57,254 | 42.9 | ▼9.9 |
| SPD | Enrico Corongiu | 19,722 | 14.8 | ▼1.6 | 15,402 | 11.5 | ▼3.7 |
| AfD | Edeltraud Schwarz | 13,383 | 10.1 | | 16,145 | 12.1 | ▲6.5 |
| Greens | Gabriela Seitz-Hoffmann | 12,066 | 9.1 | ▲1.5 | 12,753 | 9.5 | ▲1.7 |
| FDP | Karl-Martin Schröter | 9,370 | 7.0 | ▲3.9 | 13,909 | 10.4 | ▲5.2 |
| Left | Reinhard Böttger | 6,229 | 4.7 | ▲1.9 | 7,214 | 5.4 | ▲2.4 |
| FW | | | | | 2,876 | 2.2 | ▼0.6 |
| ÖDP | Maiken Winter | 4,629 | 3.5 | ▲0.9 | 2,145 | 1.6 | ▲0.2 |
| BP | Siegfried Seelos | 3,855 | 2.9 | ▼0.7 | 2,225 | 1.7 | ▼0.5 |
| Tierschutzpartei | | | | | 1,186 | 0.9 | ▲0.2 |
| PARTEI | | | | | 724 | 0.5 | |
| Pirates | | | | | 352 | 0.3 | ▼1.2 |
| DM | | | | | 292 | 0.2 | |
| V-Partei³ | | | | | 260 | 0.2 | |
| NPD | | | | | 227 | 0.2 | ▼0.4 |
| DiB | | | | | 204 | 0.2 | |
| BGE | | | | | 186 | 0.1 | |
| Gesundheitsforschung | | | | | 162 | 0.1 | |
| MLPD | | | | | 22 | 0.0 | 0.0 |
| DKP | | | | | 15 | 0.0 | |
| BüSo | | | | | 14 | 0.0 | 0.0 |
| Informal votes | | 1,295 | | | 766 | | |
| Total valid votes | | 133,038 | | | 133,567 | | |
| Turnout | | 134,333 | 80.4 | ▲8.3 | | | |
| CSU hold | Majority | 44,602 | 33.1 | ▼7.6 | | | |

=== 2013 election ===
Federal election (2013): Weilheim
| Notes: | Blue background denotes the winner of the electorate vote. Pink background denotes a candidate elected from their party list. Yellow background denotes an electorate win by a list member, or other incumbent. A ✓ or ✗ denotes status of any incumbent, win or lose respectively. | | | | | | |
| Party | Candidate | Votes | % | ±% | Party votes | % | ±% |
|---|---|---|---|---|---|---|---|
| CSU | ✓ Alexander Dobrindt | 104,236 | 57.2 | ▲5.2 | 95,885 | 52.5 | ▲6.9 |
| SPD | Angelica Dullinger | 30,019 | 16.5 | ▲2.2 | 28,342 | 15.5 | ▲2.6 |
| Greens | Gabriela Seitz-Hoffmann | 15,559 | 8.5 | ▼3.3 | 16,017 | 8.8 | ▼2.7 |
| AfD | | | | | 9,665 | 5.3 | |
| FW | Susann Enders | 6,429 | 3.5 | | 4,441 | 2.4 | |
| BP | Klaus Jacobitz | 5,599 | 3.1 | ▲1.2 | 3,573 | 2.0 | ▲0.5 |
| FDP | Klaus Breil | 5,325 | 2.9 | ▼7.6 | 9,461 | 5.2 | ▼10.7 |
| Left | Michaele Siebe | 5,321 | 2.9 | ▼1.3 | 5,629 | 3.1 | ▼1.8 |
| ÖDP | Hanns-Dieter Schlierf | 5,010 | 2.7 | ▲0.3 | 3,011 | 1.6 | ▼0.2 |
| Pirates | Alexander Lessmann | 3,137 | 1.7 | | 2,907 | 1.6 | ▼0.1 |
| Tierschutzpartei | | | | | 1,284 | 0.7 | ▲0.1 |
| NPD | Matthias Polt | 1,581 | 0.9 | ▼0.2 | 1,062 | 0.6 | ▼0.2 |
| REP | | | | | 412 | 0.2 | ▼0.2 |
| DIE FRAUEN | | | | | 321 | 0.2 | |
| DIE VIOLETTEN | | | | | 271 | 0.1 | ▼0.1 |
| Party of Reason | | | | | 196 | 0.1 | |
| PRO | | | | | 137 | 0.1 | |
| RRP | | | | | 79 | 0.0 | ▼1.0 |
| MLPD | | | | | 45 | 0.0 | 0.0 |
| BüSo | | | | | 32 | 0.0 | 0.0 |
| Informal votes | | 1,951 | | | 1,397 | | |
| Total valid votes | | 182,216 | | | 182,770 | | |
| Turnout | | 184,167 | 72.9 | ▼0.9 | | | |
| CSU hold | Majority | 74,220 | 40.7 | ▲3.0 | | | |

=== 2009 election ===
Federal election (2009): Weilheim
| Notes: | Blue background denotes the winner of the electorate vote. Pink background denotes a candidate elected from their party list. Yellow background denotes an electorate win by a list member, or other incumbent. A ✓ or ✗ denotes status of any incumbent, win or lose respectively. | | | | | | |
| Party | Candidate | Votes | % | ±% | Party votes | % | ±% |
|---|---|---|---|---|---|---|---|
| CSU | ✓ Alexander Dobrindt | 94,302 | 52.0 | ▼7.5 | 83,058 | 45.6 | ▼8.1 |
| SPD | Angelica Dullinger | 25,894 | 14.3 | ▼7.1 | 23,512 | 12.9 | ▼7.3 |
| Greens | Marcus Reichenberg | 21,516 | 11.9 | ▲4.1 | 20,871 | 11.5 | ▲3.0 |
| FDP | Klaus Breil | 19,076 | 10.5 | ▲5.8 | 28,911 | 15.9 | ▲5.2 |
| Left | Werner Bäumler | 7,568 | 4.2 | ▲1.5 | 8,897 | 4.9 | ▲2.0 |
| ÖDP | Hanns-Dieter Schlierf | 4,511 | 2.5 | | 3,277 | 1.8 | |
| Pirates | | | | | 3,098 | 1.7 | |
| BP | Pauli Doll | 3,399 | 1.9 | ▼0.1 | 2,740 | 1.5 | ▲0.3 |
| RRP | Klaus Blume | 1,921 | 1.1 | | 1,966 | 1.1 | |
| NPD | Matthias Polt | 1,883 | 1.0 | ▼0.1 | 1,501 | 1.0 | 0.0 |
| FAMILIE | | | | | 1,257 | 0.7 | 0.0 |
| Tierschutzpartei | | | | | 1,128 | 0.6 | |
| REP | | | | | 835 | 0.5 | ▼0.2 |
| Independent | Monica Herz | 725 | 0.4 | | | | |
| Independent | Waltraud Siade | 598 | 0.3 | | | | |
| DIE VIOLETTEN | | | | | 489 | 0.3 | |
| PBC | | | | | 219 | 0.1 | ▼0.1 |
| CM | | | | | 193 | 0.1 | |
| DVU | | | | | 91 | 0.0 | |
| BüSo | | | | | 57 | 0.0 | 0.0 |
| MLPD | | | | | 28 | 0.0 | 0.0 |
| Informal votes | | 2,439 | | | 1,704 | | |
| Total valid votes | | 181,393 | | | 182,128 | | |
| Turnout | | 183,832 | 73.8 | ▼6.3 | | | |
| CSU hold | Majority | 68,408 | 37.7 | ▼0.4 | | | |

=== 2005 election ===
Federal election (2005):Weilheim
| Notes: | Blue background denotes the winner of the electorate vote. Pink background denotes a candidate elected from their party list. Yellow background denotes an electorate win by a list member, or other incumbent. A ✓ or ✗ denotes status of any incumbent, win or lose respectively. | | | | | | |
| Party | Candidate | Votes | % | ±% | Party votes | % | ±% |
|---|---|---|---|---|---|---|---|
| CSU | ✓ Alexander Dobrindt | 114,756 | 59.4 | ▼4.0 | 104,036 | 53.7 | ▼10.6 |
| SPD | Angelica Dullinger | 41,229 | 21.4 | ▼1.3 | 39,115 | 20.2 | ▼0.2 |
| Greens | Marcus Reichenberg | 15,068 | 7.8 | 0.0 | 16,425 | 8.5 | ▲0.7 |
| FDP | Klaus Breil | 9.166 | 4.7 | ▲0.8 | 20,702 | 10.7 | ▲6.1 |
| Left | Günther Schachner | 5,068 | 2.6 | | 5,504 | 2.8 | ▲2.3 |
| BP | Pauli Doll | 3,754 | 1.9 | ▲0.4 | 2,296 | 1.2 | ▲0.8 |
| NPD | Eduard Hornsteiner | 2,278 | 1.2 | | 1,630 | 0.8 | ▲0.7 |
| Independent | Manuel Herz | 1,714 | 0.9 | | | | |
| Familie | | | | | 1,275 | 0.7 | |
| REP | | | | | 1,232 | 0.6 | ▲0.3 |
| GRAUEN | | | | | 551 | 0.3 | ▲0.2 |
| Feminist | | | | | 400 | 0.2 | ▲0.1 |
| PBC | | | | | 371 | 0.2 | ▲0.1 |
| BüSo | | | | | 111 | 0.1 | 0.0 |
| MLPD | | | | | 79 | 0.0 | |
| Informal votes | | 2,574 | | | 1,880 | | |
| Total valid votes | | 193,033 | | | 193,727 | | |
| Turnout | | 195,607 | 80.0 | ▼3.6 | | | |
| CSU hold | Majority | 73,527 | 38 | | | | |
