= Correctiv =

German investigative journalism organisation

- Founded: 2014
- Founder: David Schraven
- Type: Non-profit
- Purpose: Investigative journalism
- Location: Berlin, Germany; Essen, Germany
- Region served: Abuse of power, corruption, environment, education, health, social justice, right-wing extremism, religious extremism
- Method: Foundation and member supported
- Key people: David Schraven (publisher), David Crawford (senior reporter)
- Employees: 70
- Volunteers: >500
- Website: correctiv.org/en

Correctiv (self-styled CORRECT!V) is a German nonprofit investigative journalism newsroom based in Essen and Berlin. It is run by CORRECTIV – Recherchen für die Gesellschaft gemeinnützige GmbH ("CORRECTIV – Investigations for the Society (Non-profit company with limited liability)"), which also runs the online journalism academy Reporterfabrik.

Its stated goals are to provide free, independent journalism accessible to everyone. The collective says it aims to counter disinformation to strengthen democratic structures.

Correctiv has more than 70 employees and associates.

== History ==
Correctiv was initiated in January 2014 by the charitable organization "Correctiv – Recherchen für die Gesellschaft" ("Correctiv – Research for Society") based in Essen with an initial financial support by the Brost Foundation with a grant of €1 million per year for three years.

In 2017 Reporterfabrik, an independent journalism school was founded partly by people from the Correctiv collective. Correctiv continues to host and closely work with Reporterfabrik.

Correctiv.Lokal, a network for joint research by local journalists, bloggers and experts, was launched in August 2018 together with the Rudolf Augstein Foundation.

In May 2020, the Salon5 youth editorial team was founded with the support of the Ruhr Conference of the state government of North Rhine-Westphalia and the RAG Foundation.

In January 2024, Correctiv published a report on a gathering of far-right extremists in Potsdam, a meeting held at the Villa Adlon on Lake Lehnitz on November 25, 2023.

In 2025, Correctiv was designated as an undesirable organization in Russia. This will result in the media outlet's activities being banned in Russia and cooperation between Russian citizens and the outlet being criminalized.

== Organization ==
Correctiv is a member of the International Fact-Checking Network.

=== Funding ===
Correctiv is a nonprofit organization and exempt from taxation under German law. The funding comes largely from establishment foundations and corporations, such as the Open Society Foundations, Google Germany GmbH, and German Telekom, as well as membership fees and donations from the users and readers. All donations of more than €1000 are listed on the website. Despite depending on establishment foundations and corporations for most of its funding, Correctiv claims to be "nonprofit, independent and investigative".

Press research in 2026 showed that the activists continued to receive government funding from the Federal Ministry for Education, Family Affairs, Senior Citizens, Women and Youth through the "Demokratie leben!" program. In 2025/2026 €280,991 were allocated by the Ministry for a Corretiv-run "anti desinformation" project aimed at children.

=== Board of directors ===
David Schraven is the publisher and Jeannette Gusko the executive director.

=== Flight MH17 ===
Correctiv described the Flight MH17 as one of the greatest war crimes of modern times. Over several months it gathered facts, investigated in eastern Ukraine and Russia, and found witnesses to the missile launch, unveiled a clear chain of evidence that MH17 was downed by a BUK missile ground-launched by a unit of the Russian 53rd Anti-Aircraft Missile Brigade from Kursk. The brigade unit operated in mid July on Ukrainian territory without displaying national emblems. Correctivs handling of the question whether German authorities failed to warn airlines, which included projecting personal accusations against Frank-Walter Steinmeier on the building of the German Foreign Ministry and threatening him with a related personal lawsuit drew public scrutiny and raised questions whether Correctiv was engaging in journalism or campaigning.

=== 2024 AfD report and following legal disputes ===
In January 2024, Correctiv published a report titled "Secret Plan Against Germany" (German: "Geheimplan gegen Deutschland") that described a meeting between AfD and CDU members and far-right elements to plan a program of forced "re-migration" of immigrants and others considered undesirable. The report led to mass demonstrations in Germany against AfD.

The Hamburg Regional Court issued an injunction at the request of Ulrich Vosgerau against a passage in the report, concerning an alleged statement by Vosgerau regarding election challenge complaints. Correctiv had misquoted Vosgerau by claiming that he considered mass complaints to be promising. The court ruled that Correctiv could not prove the accuracy of the quote and sided with Vosgerau. The application was rejected with regard to two other statements. Vosgerau then filed with the Berlin II Regional Court, who ruled that these statements were untrue factual assertions or, at the very least, "arbitrarily fabricated" expressions of opinion.

In March 2026, the Berlin II Regional Court upheld a lawsuit filed by AfD politician Gerrit Huy and prohibited Correctiv from publishing statements about the Potsdam meeting. Among these was the statement that the meeting concerned a "master plan for the expulsion of German citizens." The Berlin II Regional Court classified this statement as an untrue statement of fact, since the meeting in Potsdam did not concern "expulsions."

However, earlier court verdicts contradict the March 2026 ruling. For instance, the Hamburg Regional Court classified the statement as an expression of opinion in December 2025. If the statements are classified as expressions of opinion, there are broader protections for Correctiv's publications.

Correctiv appealed the ruling, pointing to the role of nationalist euphemisms within the New Right and arguing that it is the task of journalistic analysis to decipher and contextualize these euphemisms. The Berlin Press Chamber failed to recognize the significance of these euphemisms.

=== Legal dispute with Karl-Theodor zu Guttenberg ===
In August of 2026 a Berlin court provisionally ruled that Correctiv must not use distorted and shortened quotes to imply that former Defense Minister zu Guttenberg supported a punctual cooperation between conservatives and right-wing populists. Correctiv previously had to correct the article multiple times, amend a reply by zu Guttenberg and accepted 8 cease-and-desist letters.

== Awards ==
- 2014: Journalist des Jahres in category "newcomer" for the team of Correctiv
- 2015: Grimme Online Award for their investigation "MH17 – Die Suche nach der Wahrheit"
- 2015: Deutscher Reporterpreis in category "innovation" for graphic feature "Weisse Wölfe" by David Schraven and Jan Feindt
- 2015: Franco-German Journalism Award for "MH17 – Die Suche nach der Wahrheit"
- 2016: Deutscher Reporterpreis in category "innovation"
- 2016: Journalist des Jahres in category "Team des Jahres" (Team of the year)
- 2016: LeadAward in category Independent of the year
- 2016: Axel Springer Preis in category "Investigation" for undercover feature "animal thieves"
- 2016: Award "Innovation of the year" by Wirtschaftsjournalist magazine for developing the software CrowdNewsroom and the analysis of mutual banks "Sparkassen-Check"
- 2017: ERM-Media Award for sustainable development. Award for Fabian Löhe and Annika Joeres for Correctiv
- 2018: Franco-German Journalism Award for the project "searise" by Annika Joeres and Simon Jockers for Correctiv
- 2018: Dr.-Georg-Schreiber-Mediaaward
- 2018: Journalist award by Apothekerstiftung Westfalen Lippe for reporting on "Alte Apotheke"
- 2018: Otto-Brenner-Preis for journalism for the works "Er kommt am Abend" and "Vergewaltigt auf Europas Feldern" by Pascale Müller (Correctiv) and Stefania Prandi (BuzzFeed)
- 2018: Umweltmedienpreis by Deutsche Umwelthilfe for the project "Irrsinn der Agrarpolitik" by Justus von Daniels, Stefan Wehrmeyer and Annika Joeres for Correctiv
- 2019: Nannen Prize in feature for article "Vergewaltigt auf Europas Feldern" by Pascale Müller (Correctiv) and Stefania Prandi (BuzzFeed)
- 2020: Deutsch-Französischer Journalistenpreis in the category „Multimedia“ for their reporting on tax evasion
- 2023: Reporter:innen-Preis 2023 in the category of „Data Journalism“ for an investigation about the state of women's shelters
- 2023: Deutscher Verlagspreis
- 2023: Grimme Online Award in the category of „Recherche“ for their research on access to abortion in Germany
- 2024: Carlo Schmid Foundation prize
- 2024: VOICE Albert O. Hirschman Prize
- 2024: Prize for the Freedom and Future of the Media
