= David Schraven =

German journalist (born 1970)

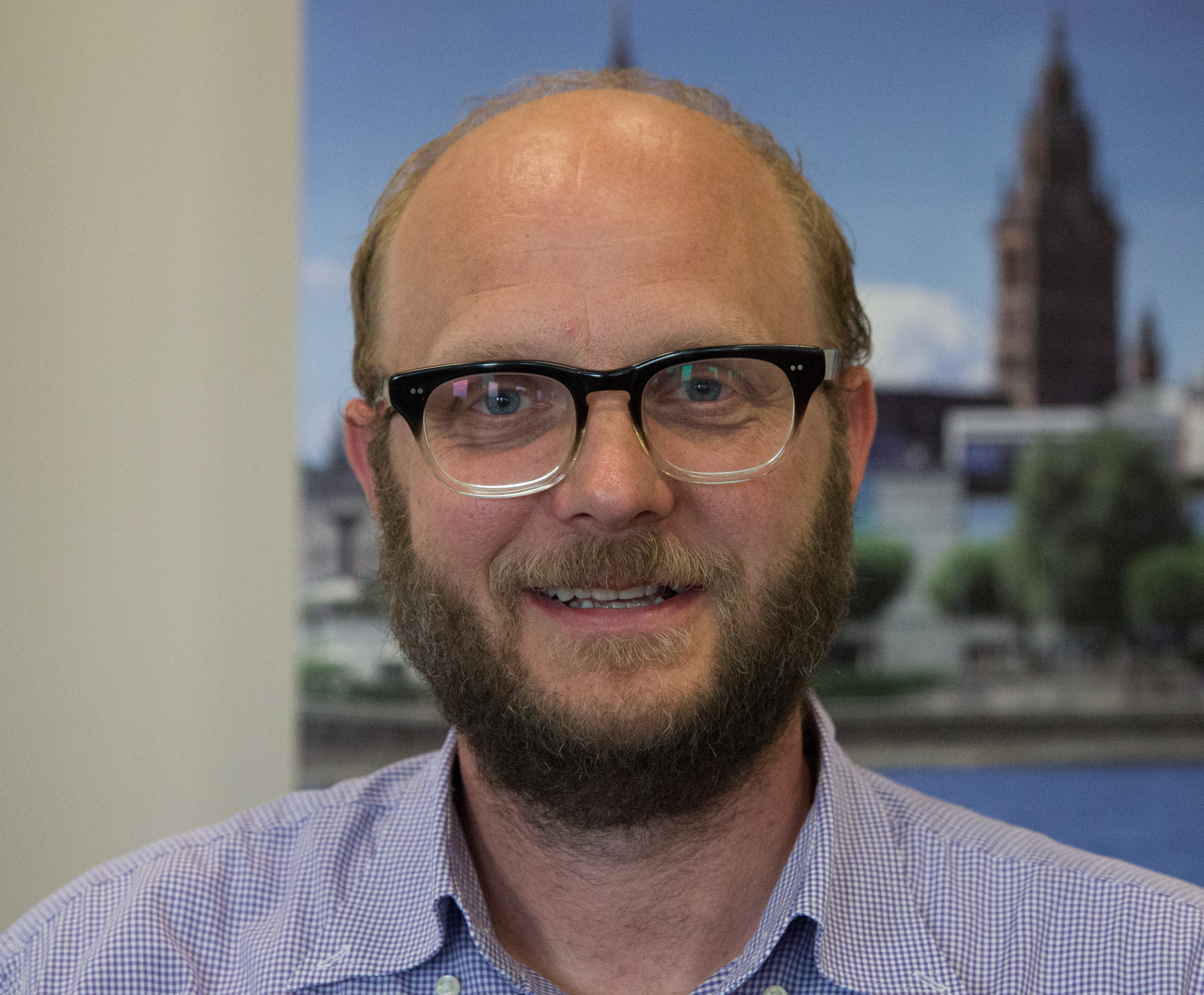
- Schraven in 2017
- Born: 1970 (age 55–56) Bottrop, Germany
- Occupation: Journalist
- Genre: Investigative journalism
- Notable awards: Deutschen Reporterpreis

David Schraven (born 1970 in Bottrop, Germany) is a German journalist. From 2010 to 2014, he was head of investigations at Funke Mediengruppe. From 2007 to September 2014, he was treasurer of German association of investigative journalists Netzwerk Recherche. In 2014 he founded Correctiv.

== Career ==
He was the founder of the German newspaper taz ruhr. Later, he worked as a reporter on energy issues for the Axel Springer Group. Then, in 2010, he continued his research projects as head of investigations at Funke Mediengruppe.

Schraven published several reports about German military action by the Bundeswehr in Afghanistan. In 2011, he explained the details of the Operation Halmazag. In 2012, he published an investigation of the German military actions in Afghanistan on a special website with leaked documents. In 2013 his graphic novel reportage Kriegszeiten (Carlsen Verlag) was nominated for the Deutsche Jugendliteraturpreis (German Youth Book Award).

He has contributed to various reference books about investigative journalism for the German association of investigative journalists Netzwerk Recherche. The book Reporter im verdeckten Einsatz (PDF) deals with undercover research methods and Kritischer Wirtschaftsjournalismus (PDF) focuses on investigative business journalism.

In 2014, he founded Correctiv.

== Awards ==
During his career as an investigative reporter, Schraven won several prices for his investigative stories. He came third on the best known award for investigative journalism in Germany called Wächterpreis for his investigation of toxic drinking water. Then he won the Swiss "Fichtnerpreis" for his research about a corrupt politician. In 2015, he received the Grimme Online Award for overseeing the investigation into downing Flight MH17. He also won the Deutschen Reporterpreis for his book Weisse Wölfe (illustrated by Jan Feindt).

== Books ==
- 2009: Undercover: Reporter im verdeckten Einsatz, Wiesbaden: Netzwerk Recherche, ISBN 978-3-9812408-1-8,
- 2011: Die wahre Geschichte vom Untergang der Alexander Kielland (graphic novel), Carlsen Verlag, ISBN 978-3-551-73052-7, with Vincent Burmeister (Artist)
- 2012: Author graphic reportage Kriegszeiten, Carlsen Verlag, ISBN 978-3-551-78698-2, nominated for the international youth book award Deutschen Jugendliteraturpreis 2013, with Vincent Burmeister (artist)
- 2014: Zechenkinder: 25 Geschichten über das schwarze Herz des Ruhrgebiets, Ankerherz-Verlag, ISBN 978-3-940138-54-5, with Uwe Weber (Fotograf)
- 2015: WEISSE WÖLFE. Eine graphische Reportage über rechten Terror (graphic novel), CORRECTIV, with Jan Feindt (Artist), ISBN 978-3-9816917-0-2.
- 2018: Unter Krähen: Aus dem Inneren der Republik (graphic novel), CORRECTIV, with Vincent Burmeister (artist) ISBN 978-3981740097.
- 2020: publisher Corona: Geschichte eines angekündigten Sterbens, DTV, with Cordt Schnibben ISBN 978-3423262811.
- 2022: Was wir wollen, CORRECTIV ISBN 978-3948013202.
