= System catering =

Method of standardized food preparation

System catering is a method of standardized food preparation which can be duplicated at all the branches of a catering chain such as KFC, Little Chef or McDonald's. This term is not, however, widely used in the chain restaurant industry, which typically refers to its style of operations simply as "food service". It is likely that the term "system catering" is a loose translation of the German word "Systemgastronomie" used to describe this business in German. The catering is centrally controlled and the various branches sell the same product range and provide the same service. The restaurants look alike from the outside, the interior fixtures and fittings are identical and the same standards of quality control are applied in all branches. A customer can therefore expect the same standard of food and service at any branch of a firm which operates with system catering.
