= Brittany Sellner =

American white nationalist and conspiracy theorist

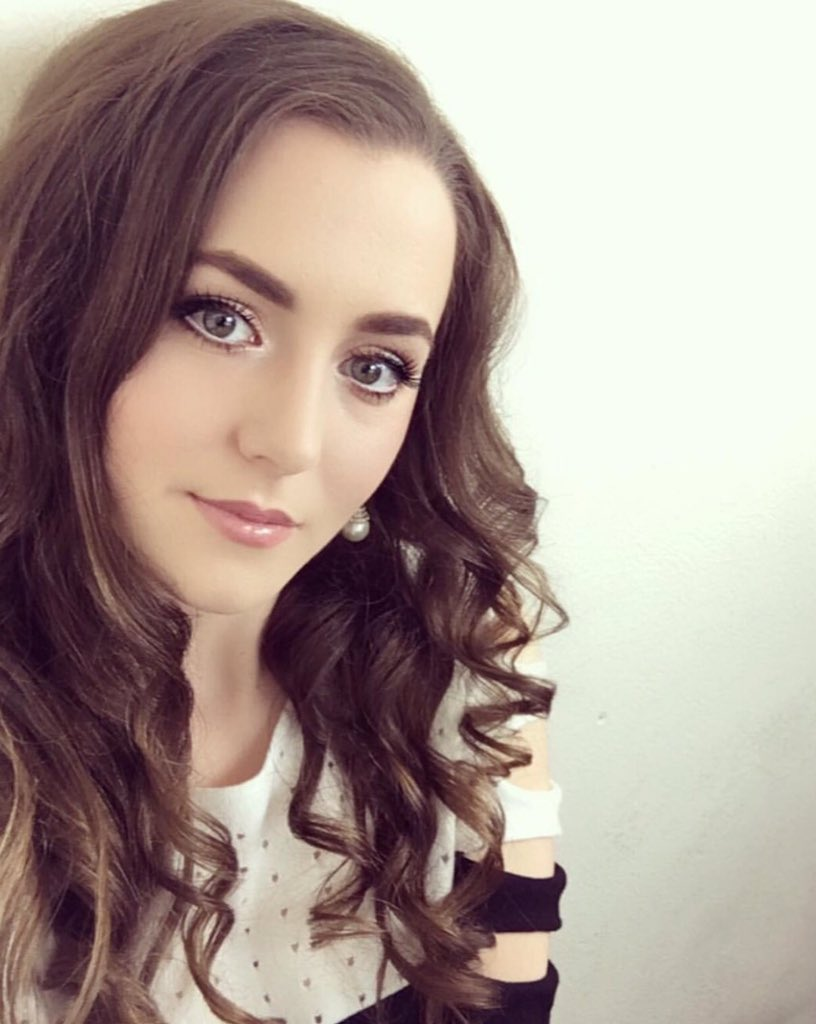
- Pettibone in 2017
- Born: Brittany Alicia Merced Pettibone; October 7, 1992 (age 34); California, U.S.
- Occupations: Activist; influencer; author
- Years active: 2016–present
- Spouse: Martin Sellner (m. 2019)
- Children: 1
- Website: https://web.archive.org/web/20260117162959/https://BrittPettibone.com/

Brittany Sellner (née Pettibone; born October 7, 1992) is an American white nationalist and conspiracy theorist. She has been active as a YouTuber, and advocates anti-feminism and the Great Replacement conspiracy theory.

== Political activities ==
Sellner began her political activism in 2016 in support of Donald Trump's presidential campaign. She promoted the Pizzagate conspiracy theory, and co-hosted the video podcast Virtue of the West with Tara McCarthy. The following year, she was one of the speakers at events that led to protests at Berkeley. She also traveled to France to support French presidential candidate Marine Le Pen, and to Sicily to join Generation Identity's efforts to stop NGO boats of African migrants.

In 2018, she was refused entry to the United Kingdom and deported along with her boyfriend, Austrian Identitarian activist Martin Sellner, after having come to Britain with the intention of interviewing Tommy Robinson. The same year, together with Lauren Southern, she met with and interviewed Russian ultranationalist Aleksandr Dugin. Sellner is also noted to be a friend of Dutch far-right influencer Eva Vlaardingerbroek, and has appeared in anti-COVID-19 vaccination demonstrations.

Sellner describes herself as a "Catholic American nationalist", and advocates a "full stop on mass immigration". The Anti-Defamation League have described her as an alt-right or alt-lite activist who traffics in white nationalist ideas, having contributed to websites such as AltRight.com and Red Ice. She has been a major promoter of the Identitarian movement, and has promoted the white genocide and George Soros conspiracy theories. At the same time, she is noted for presenting a "soft" and feminine tradwife influencer lifestyle on social media like Instagram, appealing to a more mainstream audience.

== Personal life ==
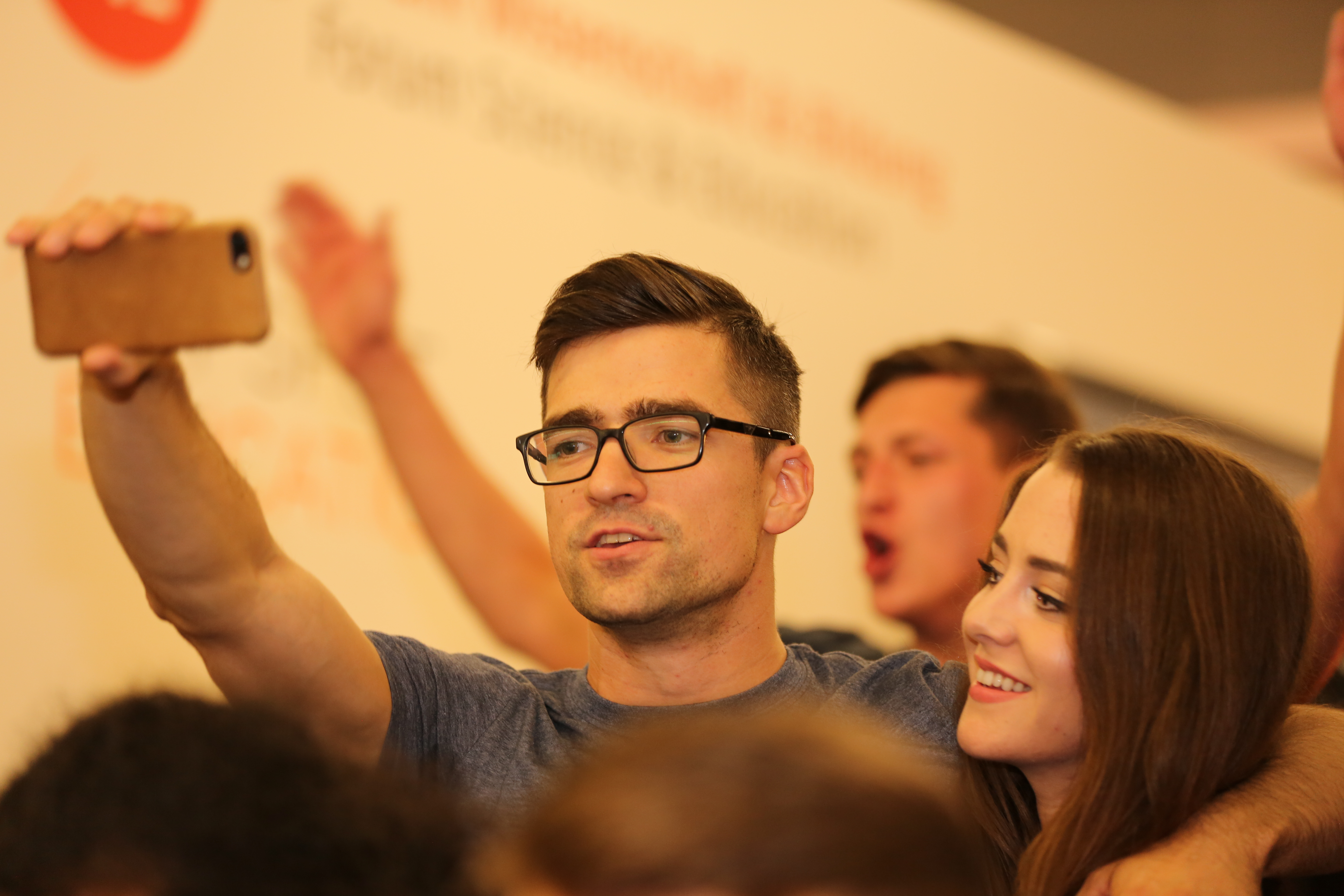
Brittany and Martin Sellner in 2017

Together with her identical twin Nicole, Sellner authored the science-fiction and fantasy novel Hatred Day under the pseudonym T.S. Pettibone in 2016. The novel was selected as one of Kirkus Reviews' Best Books Of 2016.

Originally from California, she married Martin Sellner, and moved to Austria in 2019. The couple had originally planned to get married in Idaho in the US, while Brittany was living in Post Falls. However, Martin's visa was cancelled after Austrian police raided his home, even though the couple eventually received backing from the Kootenai County Republican Central Committee. In June 2019, the Austrian investigation of Martin for alleged contacts with Christchurch terrorist Brenton Tarrant widened to include Brittany, for her interview with Australian Blair Cottrell. Brittany and Martin Sellner had a son in 2021.

== Bibliography ==
- The Steel Inferno: There are as many secrets as there are faces. Chrysanthalix Press. 2013. ISBN 978-0615727882.
- Hatred Day. Chrysanthalix Press. 2016. ISBN 978-0997202915.
- What Makes Us Girls: And Why It's All Worth It. Reason Books. 2018. ISBN 978-0997202977.
- Patriots Not Welcome. Chrysanthalix Press. 2021. ISBN 978-0997202991.
