= Eva Vlaardingerbroek =

Dutch political commentator (born 1996)

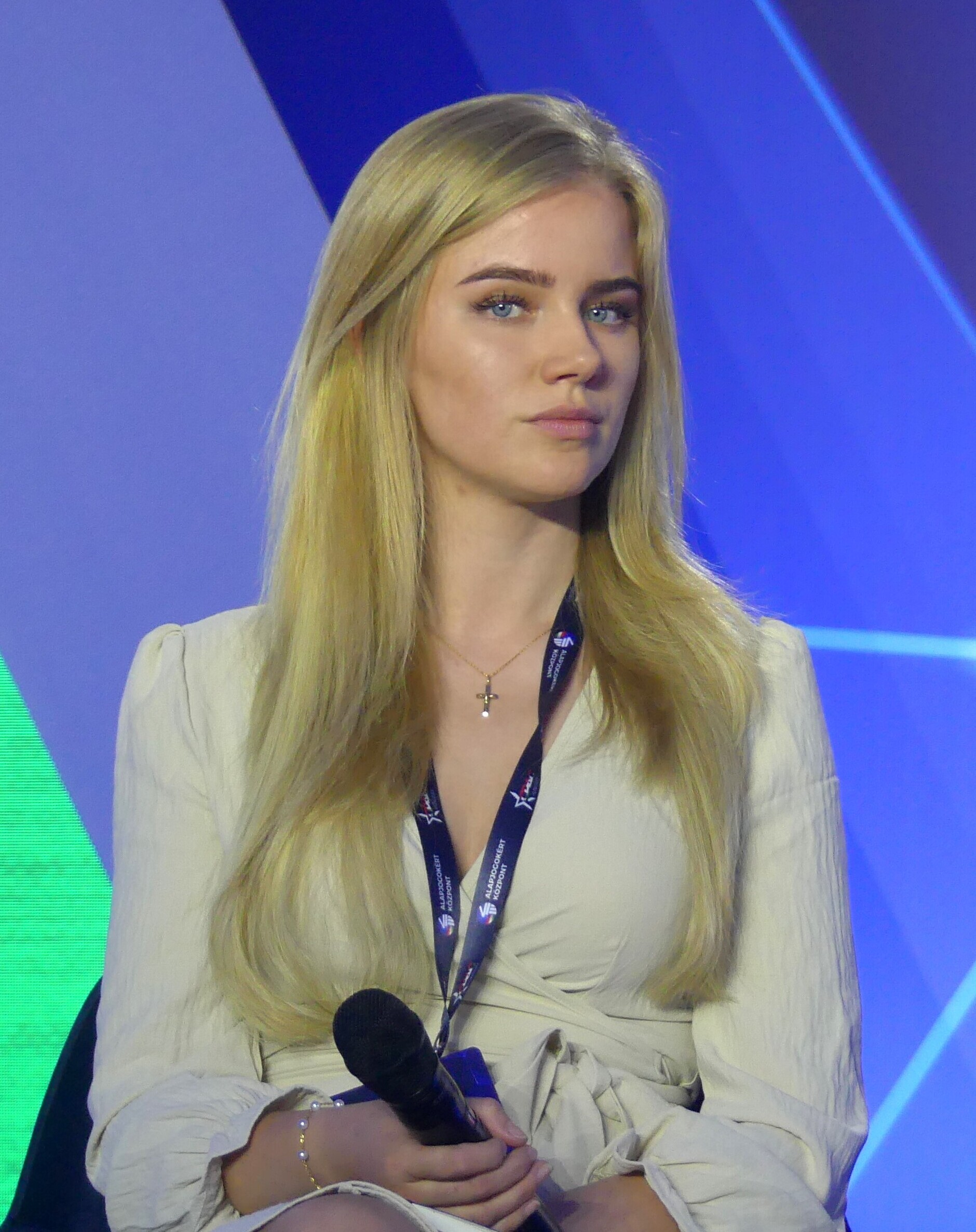
- Vlaardingerbroek at CPAC Hungary, 2023
- Born: Eva Lotte Louise Vlaardingerbroek; 3 September 1996 (age 30); Amsterdam, Netherlands
- Education: Utrecht University (LLB); Leiden University (LLM)
- Occupations: Political commentator; activist
- Political party: FvD (2016–2020)
- Spouse: Francesco Gargallo di Castel Lentini (m. 2024)
- Children: 1
- Father: Kees Vlaardingerbroek

Eva Lotte Louise Vlaardingerbroek (born 3 September 1996) is a Dutch far-right (Note: Far-right:) political commentator and activist. She has been particularly vocal about issues surrounding farmers in the Dutch farmers' protests. She is noted for her criticism of the Dutch government under prime minister Mark Rutte. She has made numerous appearances with American conservative pundit Tucker Carlson, arguing that the Dutch farming crisis is not a result of the nitrogen crisis in the Netherlands. She is known for promoting far-right conspiracy theories such as the Great Replacement conspiracy theory, which is a recurrent theme in her speeches and discussions.

== Early life ==
Vlaardingerbroek was born on 3 September 1996 in Amsterdam to a Catholic mother and a Protestant father, both of whom work in the classical music industry. Her father, Kees Vlaardingerbroek, is a musicologist and former concert director. She has a younger brother, and her paternal grandfather was a Dutch Reformed pastor. She was baptized as a child in the Protestant faith.

== Education and political career ==
Vlaardingerbroek grew up in Hilversum and studied law at Utrecht University, where she participated in the Utrecht Law College honours program. After studying for some time in Germany at LMU Munich and completing her bachelor's degree, she began the master's degree in Encyclopedia and Philosophy of Law at Leiden University. She wrote her thesis on The Contractualization of Sex in the #MeToo Era and completed her master's with honours.

During her studies, Vlaardingerbroek joined political party Forum for Democracy (FvD) in 2016. In 2019, she gave a speech against modern feminism at that year's party congress. In 2019, she took up an internship with the FvD faction in the European Parliament in Brussels. After that, Vlaardingerbroek left Brussels behind to work in Leiden as a lecturer-researcher, during which she published several opinion pieces in Elsevier Weekblad. In October 2020, she put her position at the university and her dissertation on hold to focus fully on a political career, followed by FvD leader Thierry Baudet's announcement on 31 October that Vlaardingerbroek would fill the fifth spot on the party's candidate list for the House of Representatives.

After a dispute over Baudet's leadership and discriminatory remarks made by members of the youth wing publicly escalated in November 2020, Vlaardingerbroek announced on WNL's morning show Goedemorgen Nederland on 26 November that she had chosen sides against Baudet. Later that same day, Vlaardingerbroek and Joost Eerdmans, Annabel Nanninga, and Nicki Pouw-Verweij released a joint statement announcing their departure from the party. At the time this meant the end of Vlaardingerbroek's political career. In April 2023, Algemeen Dagblad published an exposé that revealed how in 2021, months after the conflict and split, FvD had threatened her and other former members with hefty fines for allegedly breaching party confidentiality. Vlaardingerbroek was never officially served nor found guilty of breaching party confidentiality and described it as an attempt to scare her into silence.

After leaving FvD, Vlaardingerbroek referred her time of membership in the party as "a horrible time."

In November 2023, Vlaardingerbroek stated that she would vote for the Party for Freedom (PVV) in the 2023 Dutch general election.

== Opinion work and activism ==
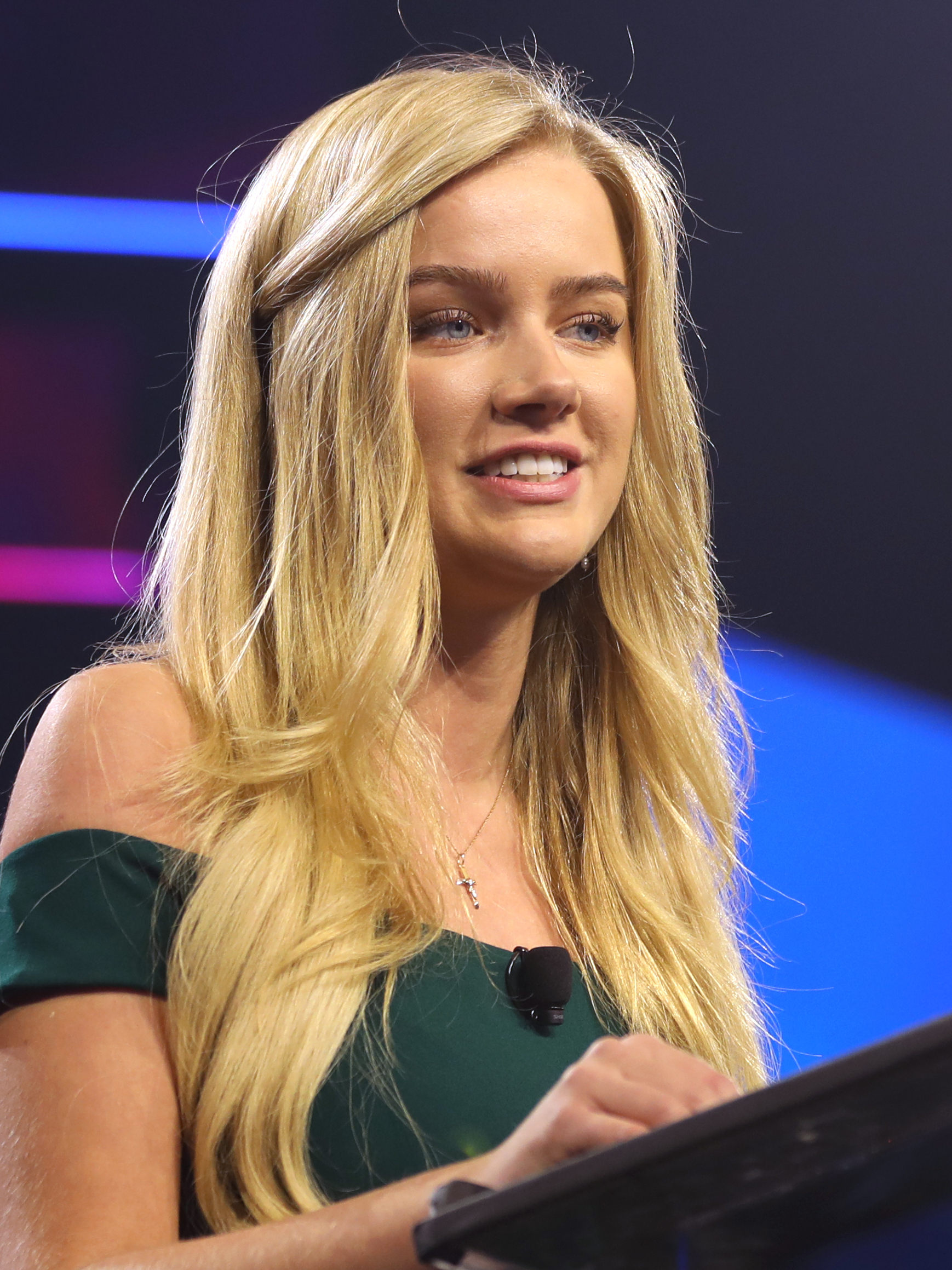
Vlaardingerbroek speaking at the 2023 AmericaFest at the Phoenix Convention Center in Phoenix, Arizona

In December 2019, Het Parool stated that Vlaardingerbroek "shocked the feminist Netherlands with a speech against modern feminism", in which she called it "a form of hardcore cognitive dissonance". She stated that "neo-feminists have no reflection on what is retrograde or problematic about multiculturalism, especially on the subject that interests them: sexism. So, this feminism is indeed one of the biggest shams of our time." She received scathing criticism by a number of Dutch commentators for her remarks, after Dutch newspaper De Volkskrant and some of their journalists branded Vlaardingerbroek the "shield maiden of the far right" and an "Aryan princess" who constituted a danger to the rights of women and minorities. In an interview with Bert Dijkstra of De Telegraaf, Vlaardingerbroek fought back, calling the article a politically motivated "character assassination". Vlaardingerbroek has also spoken against abortion, arguing that life begins at conception.

During the COVID-19 pandemic, Vlaardingerbroek spoke out as a firm critic of lockdowns, mRNA vaccines, and other COVID-19 restrictions, stating that the Western world was "losing its freedom". In January 2021, Vlaardingerbroek made a live appearance on Tucker Carlson Tonight stating that Europe was "heading towards a new system, a tyrannical regime, of mass surveillance and control". Also in 2021, Vlaardingerbroek worked for some time in Sweden as presenter of her own pan-European talk show "Let's Talk About It" on the YouTube channel of Swedish media outlet Riks, which is affiliated with the Sweden Democrats party.

On 1 January 2022, she began working as a legal advisor at a law firm, focusing on human rights and civil litigation. After more than four months, this employment was terminated.

In early July 2022, Vlaardingerbroek spoke out about the nitrogen crisis in the Netherlands on the American television channel Fox News in conversation with Tucker Carlson. She argued that the crisis was being used to steal land from farmers in order to build homes on it for immigrants, which is part of the Great Replacement conspiracy theory and the Great Reset conspiracy theory. In a June 2023 report, published by the Changing Markets Foundation, she was identified as one of the "key misinfluencers" promoting "misinformation around Dutch nitrogen policy changes."

Vlaardingerbroek regularly appears as a commentator on Mark Steyn's talk show on the British television channel GB News, as well as on the right-wing populist YouTube channel Achtung, Reichelt! by Julian Reichelt, the former editor-in-chief of the German tabloid Bild. On 11 March 2023, Vlaardingerbroek participated in the pro-farmer Zuiderpark protest against the government in The Hague. At the protests, Vlaardingerbroek stated that "our farmers are fighting against the worst kind of injustice". Later that year, Vlaadingerbroek spoke against transgender model Rikkie Kollé winning the Miss Nederland competition, saying that "man has been elected Miss Netherlands. I wouldn't expect anything else in our post-truth world".

At CPAC 2024, Vlaardingerbroek asserted that the Great Replacement conspiracy theory is real, citing that 56 percent of the population of Amsterdam, where she lives, consists of immigrants. (Note: According to Reuters, this percentage includes Amsterdam residents "with a migration background," meaning that at least one parent was born abroad. Direct immigrants consist of 37 percent of Amsterdam's population.) She added, "I think we all know what they mean with the word 'diversity.' It means less white people. Less of you," apparently addressing the audience. The speech was removed by YouTube for violating its hate speech policies.

In 2025, Vlaardingerbroek spoke at a far-right rally in London organized by Tommy Robinson. She said, "They are demanding the sacrifice of our children on the altar of mass migration. Let's not beat about the bush – this is the rape, replacement and murder of our people … Remigration is possible, and it's up to us to make it happen."

In January 2026, Vlaardingerbroek's Electronic Travel Authorisation (ETA) to the United Kingdom was revoked by the Home Office, after they deemed her presence not to be "conducive to the public good".

In May 2026 Vlaardingerbroek and Martin Sellner set up a petition titled "SaveEuropeAct", a proposed European Citizens' Initiative advocating an end to non-European immigration and the establishment of a Europe-wide remigration framework. Sellner described the initiative as an effort to preserve the "ethnocultural continuity" of European nations. It received more than half a million signs till July the same year. The European commission commented on the petition, stating „it would constitute discrimination grounded on race and ethnic origin and be manifestly contrary to Article 21 of the Charter of Fundamental Rights of the European Union“.

=== Twitter ===
Vlaardingerbroek has an active presence on X (formerly Twitter), where, As of January 2026, she has 1.2 million followers. She describes herself as a "Shieldmaiden of the far right" as a reappropriation of an epithet given to her in the Dutch press.

On 25 November 2023, she expressed her sympathy for Derek Chauvin after he had been stabbed in prison. Chauvin was convicted for the murder of George Floyd: second-degree murder, third-degree murder, and second-degree manslaughter. Vlaardingerbroek called him "a victim of mass formation psychosis and mob rule" as well as innocent of the murder.

During the Russo-Ukrainian war (2022–present), she has criticized the Dutch government for delivering weapons to Ukraine and relayed Tucker Carlson's message about the high standard of living in Russia.

== Personal life ==
In April 2023, Vlaardingerbroek and her father were confirmed as Catholics in the Personal Ordinariate of Our Lady of Walsingham at the Church of Our Lady of the Assumption and St Gregory in London. She chose the confirmation name "Joan" in honor of Joan of Arc.

=== Relationships ===
Until late 2020, Vlaardingerbroek was in a relationship with French author Julien Rochedy, who served as president of Génération Nation, the youth wing of the French right-wing populist party Front National from 2012 to 2014.

In November 2020, during the conflict within the FvD, Vlaardingerbroek publicly opposed party leader Thierry Baudet, who then revealed that they had had a brief affair in 2017. Vlaardingerbroek responded by clarifying that it had been nothing more than a fleeting relationship.

In late 2021, PragerU co-founder Dennis Prager introduced Will Witt, an American former PragerU commentator, to Vlaardingerbroek. In a since-deleted Instagram post, Witt announced their engagement on 29 March 2022. The engagement later ended at an unspecified time.

On 13 July 2024, Vlaardingerbroek married Francesco Gargallo di Castel Lentini, an Italian lawyer based in Rome, in a Catholic ceremony. Lentini has represented clients in cases involving the Italian security services, and his work has touched on immigration-related issues. On 11 October 2024, Vlaardingerbroek announced that she was pregnant with their first child. In December 2024, the couple welcomed their son.
