= Identitäre Bewegung Österreich =

Austrian far-right organization

- Identitäre Bewegung Österreich logo representing the Battle of Thermopylae
- Formation: 2012
- Type: Neue Rechte/German and Austrian New Right; Identitarianism; Ethnopluralism; Pan-European nationalism; White nationalism; Regionalism; Austrian nationalism
- Purpose: Metapolitics, To spread Identitarianism in Austria as part of a larger network known as Generation Identity Activism Europa, Jugend, Reconquista (Europa, Youth, Reconquista)
- Region served: Austria
- Members: ▲364+
- Leaders: Martin Sellner, Patrick Lenart
- Parent organization: Bloc Identitaire
- Affiliations: Les Identitaires (France) Generation Identitaire France (France); Generatie Identiteit België (Belgium); Generazione Identitaria Italia (Italy); Generation Identitær Danmark (Denmark); Identitäre Bewegung Deutschland (Germany); Identitäre Bewegung Schweiz (Switzerland); Identitás Generáció Magyarország (Hungary); Generacija Identitete Slovenija (Slovenia); Generace Identity Česko (Czechia/Czech Republic); Generation Identity United Kingdom and Éire (United Kingdom and Ireland; Generation Identity Russia (Russia) Generation Identity Canada/IDCanada (Canada, formerly)
- Website: www.identitaere-bewegung.at

Identitäre Bewegung Österreich (IBÖ; lit. 'Identitarian Movement of Austria') is an Austrian far-right nationalist and Neue Rechte organization. Inspired by the French Bloc identitaire, it belongs to the pan-European Identitarian movement and is the Austrian branch of the organization known as Generation Identity (GI).

The IBÖ opposes liberalism, internationalism, Islam and Islamism, multiculturalism and the melting pot model, instead advocating for ethnopluralism. It has been categorized as being part of the overall Neue Rechte movement by several government agencies and NGOs, including the Federal Office for the Protection of the Constitution and Counterterrorism and the Documentation Centre of Austrian Resistance; likewise, close ties to several irredentist Deutsche Burschenschaft Österreich (DBÖ) and the neo-Nazi scene have been documented.

== History ==
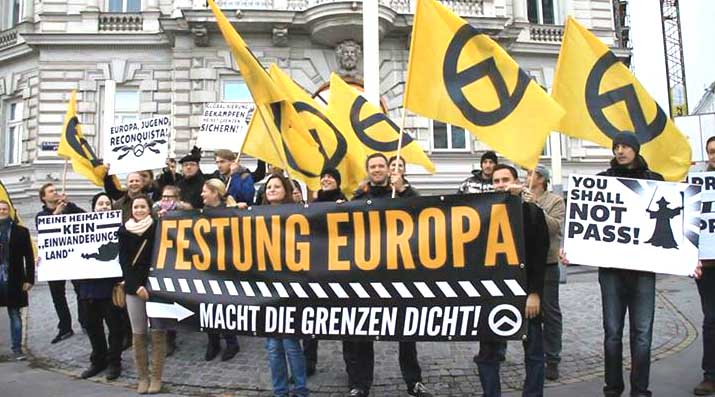
IBÖ rally, Vienna, November 10, 2013

The first Identitarian Austrian organization was founded in spring 2012 and called "WIR - Wiens Identitäre Richtung" (We - Vienna's Identitarian Course/School) and was led by Alexander Markovics. Later the same year the "Identitäre Bewegung Österreich" was founded by Martin Sellner, Patrick Lenart, and Alexander Markovics, among others. The first nationwide media presence occurred in May 2013 as a reaction to the Identitarian so-called counter-occupation of the Votive Church in Vienna against protesting asylum seekers.

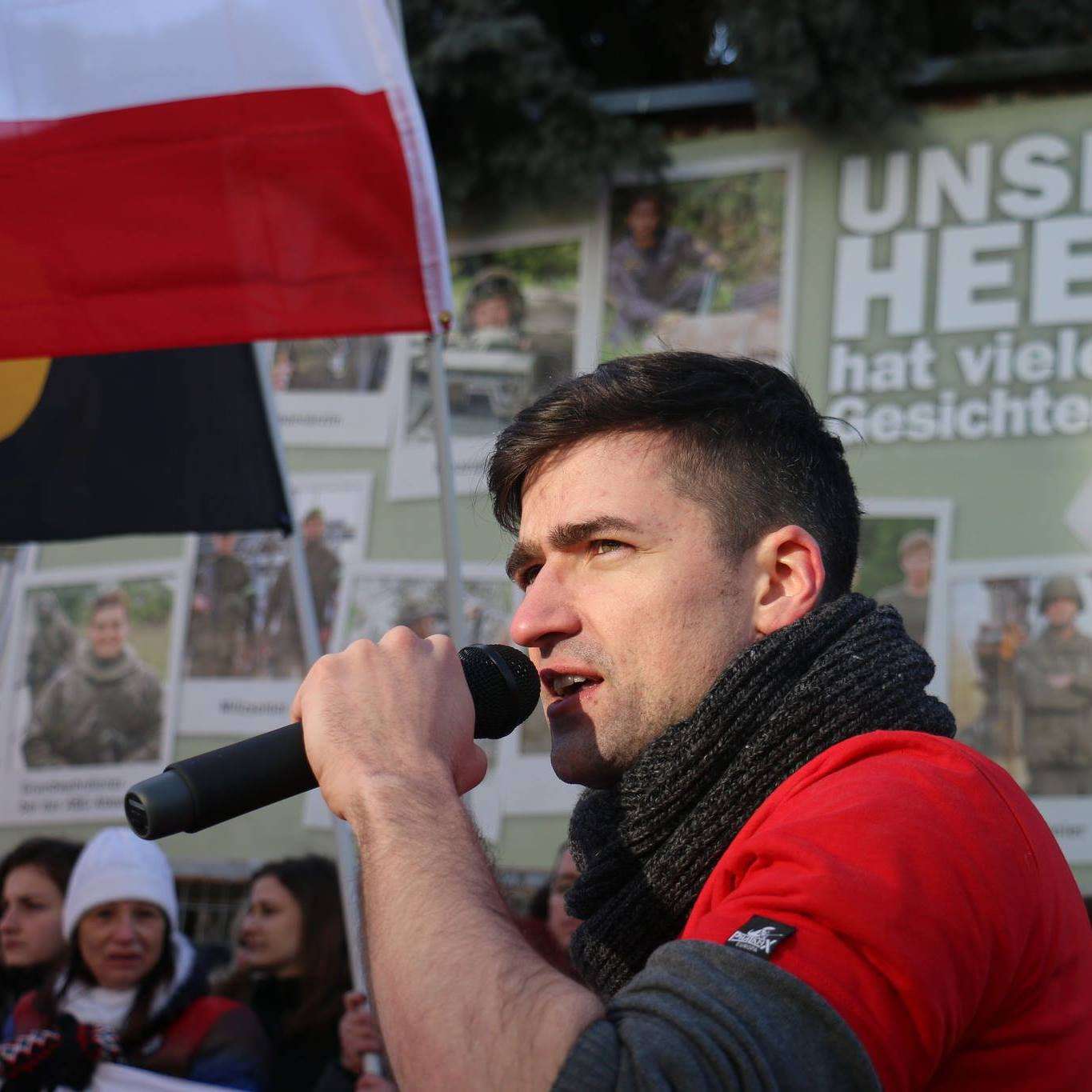
Austrian identitarian leader Martin Sellner at a protest in Graz

On 27 April 2018, several facilities of the Identitarian Movement were searched by the Austrian police, and investigations were started against its leader Martin Sellner on suspicion that a criminal organization was being formed. The newspaper Österreich reported that according to the Identitarians the homes of Sellner and co-leader Patrick Lenart were also raided, computers and documents impounded and the account of the Identitarians in Hungary was closed. On 4 July, ten members and seven sympathizers of the movement were accused of spreading "radical, xeno- and Islamophobic ideology" as well as selling propaganda material over the Internet, and tried in Graz on charges of criminal association, incitement, property damage, coercion, and personal injury.

On 26 July, the court ruled that the IBÖ was not a criminal organization and acquitted all defendants of incitement and criminal association, though two defendants were fined for material damage, one for coercion and assault.

According to the Austrian chancellor Sebastian Kurz, in March 2019 the Austrian government considered dissolving the IBÖ because Sellner had received a donation of 1,500 euros from Brenton Harrison Tarrant, the Australian perpetrator of the Christchurch mosque shootings at Al Noor Mosque and Linwood Islamic Centre in Christchurch, New Zealand, that left 51 dead and injured 50 more. Austria's minister of the interior Herbert Kickl however stated that the suspect in the Christchurch terror attacks had no personal contacts with right-wing groups or individuals in Austria. However, it was later revealed that Sellner had exchanged emails with Tarrant between January 2018 and July 2018 with one inviting Tarrant for a drink in case he ever came to Vienna. Tarrant reciprocated by returning the offer if Sellner ever visited New Zealand or Australia. Shortly afterwards, he booked a rental car in Austria and went on to spend several days there. In another email Sellner sent Tarrant a link to his English language YouTube channel. Sellner confirmed the email exchange but denied ever meeting the latter in person or knowing of his plans.

== Ideology ==
The IBÖ opposes Islamism, multiculturalism and the melting pot model, instead advocating for ethnopluralism. In accordance with Umberto Eco's characteristics of fascist ideology the Documentation Centre of Austrian Resistance (DÖW) classes it as a neofascist as well as far-right movement. Disapproving of everything they consider being rooted in American imperialism, they oppose Austria's NATO partnership as well as the international sanctions against Russia. Economically, they reject capitalism, communism and socialism in favor of essentialist Third Position economics, promoting a syncretic approach to anti-capitalist and anti-globalist politics and favoring an independent alliance of sovereign nation states with Russia. On their website and Facebook page, they cite the works of Aleksandr Dugin, Dominique Venner, and Alain de Benoist as major influences.

== Activities ==
- In February 2013, nine members of the IBÖ attempted a counter-occupation of the Viennese Votive Church that had previously been occupied by refugees to protest living conditions within the government-owned and privately administered refugee camps they've been assigned to. They were arrested and escorted off the premises by SWAT officers several hours later following a priest's request for police assistance.
- On 10 November 2013, the IBÖ briefly occupied a balcony of the Fundamental Rights Agency until police officers arrived to escort them off the premises.
- On 17 May 2014, the IBÖ attempted to stage another rally in Vienna's main shopping mile Mariahilfer Straße. Despite having been provided with a protective detail by the Federal Police, they were unable to gain access to their planned route as a result of a considerably larger anti-racist counter demonstration. While interaction between the two demonstrations was minimal and largely restricted to a verbal level, State Director Gerhard Pürstl received heavy criticism from both activist groups and national media outlets over the use of heavy-handed riot control tactics. 37 anti-racist protesters were arrested; a banner that Federal Police officers confiscated from a group of activists was later put on display on the IBÖ's website.
- On 14 April 2016, a group of roughly 40 IBÖ activists entered University of Vienna's Audimax lecture hall where they stormed the stage while a play by the Jewish playwright and novelist Elfriede Jelinek was being performed by refugee actors. The activists used a megaphone and a banner poured with fake blood to accuse the audience of being hypocrites while documenting the incident photographically. Attendants of the play report being physically attacked by IBÖ members, although the IBÖ categorically denies accusations of engaging in political violence. The Federal Office for the Protection of the Constitution and Counterterrorism reports a total of eight charges of assault with grievous bodily harm filed by both members of the audience and IBÖ activists, which are being processed; the Federal Police has dropped all felony charges and announced that it is merely investigating the possibility of an unlawful public disturbance. Heinz-Christian Strache, the leader of the right-wing Freedom Party of Austria (FPÖ) released a statement on Facebook where he called the stage invasion "peaceful".

On the 27th of that month, the group protested the same play at the Burgtheater by scaling the building and displayed a banner with the word "HEUCHLER!" ("hypocrites") from the roof and dropping leaflets.

- On 13 April 2019, the IBÖ organized a protest "for freedom of speech and against the Great Replacement" in front of the Palais Trautson where the Austrian Ministry of Justice is located.

== Trial ==
In May 2018, Austrian state prosecutors announced that they were going to press criminal charges against Martin Sellner and 9 other prominent activists in the movement, among 7 "active sympathisers". The prosecutors cited laws used to combat the mafia, claiming that those accused were guilty of forming a criminal organisation. In addition, the case included counts of hate speech, criminal association, coercion, and damage to private property. The charges came after police raids the previous month, in which the houses of several members of the group, including the house of the leader, Martin Sellner, who was one of those charged following the prosecutors' announcement.

After an extensive court trial in the town of Graz, the accused 17 were found not guilty of the charges for hate speech and of having formed a criminal organisation made against them. However, two of the accused were given fines for cases of property damage during their activism. This was hailed as a major victory by the identitarian movement (particularly Martin Sellner and his then fiancée, American blogger and journalist Brittany Pettibone), who believed the charges made against them to be unfair and an attempt to politically censor and repress the organisation.

== See also ==
- Identity Evropa/American Identity Movement (IE/AIM), an alt-right organization from the United States founded in 2016 and rebranded in 2019 modeled after Generation Identity in Europe.
