= Martin Sellner =

Austrian far-right activist (born 1989)

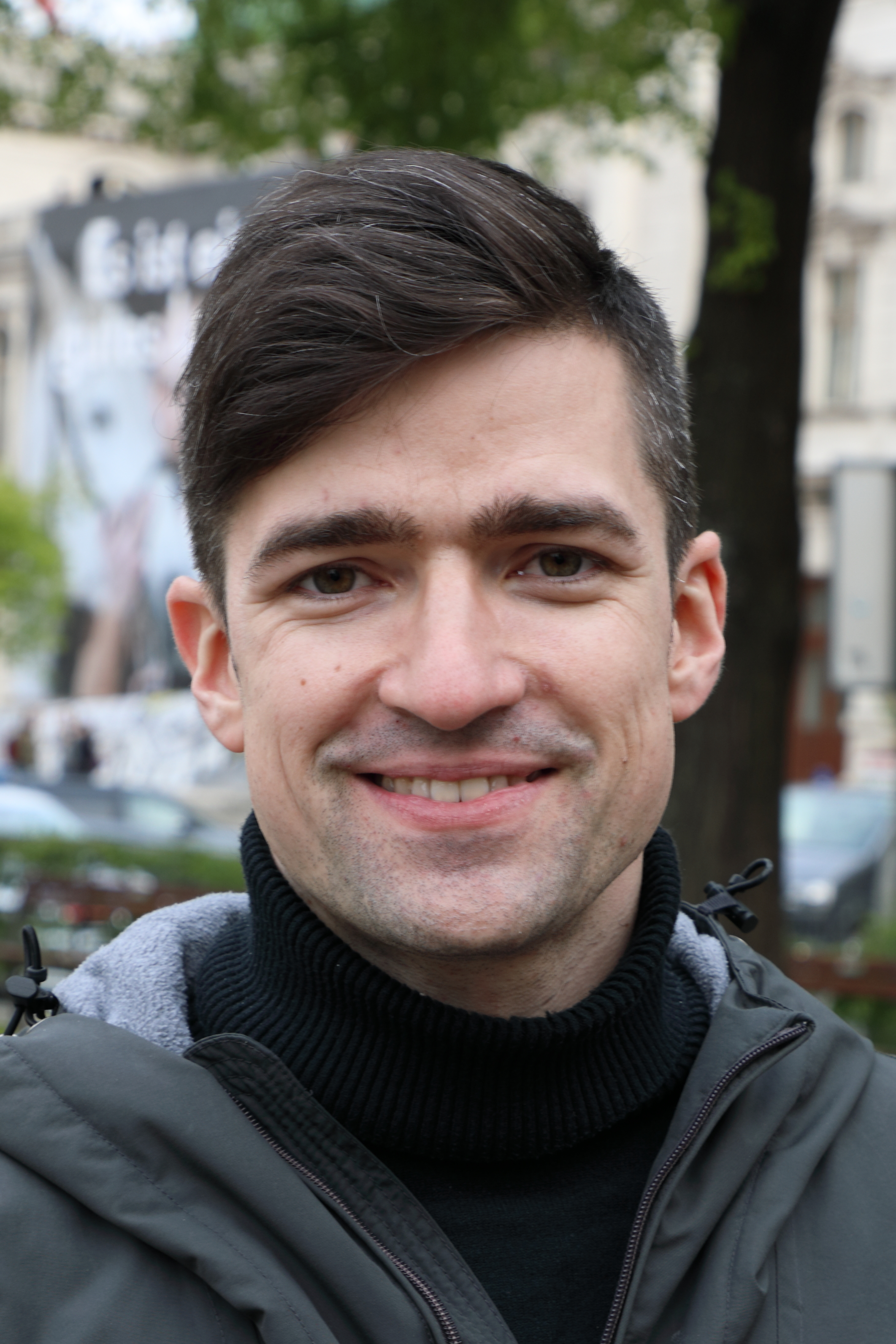
- Sellner in 2019
- Born: Martin Michael Sellner; 8 January 1989 (age 37); Vienna, Austria
- Education: University of Vienna
- Occupation: Far-right activist
- Organisation: Identitäre Bewegung Österreich
- Spouse: Brittany Pettibone (m. 2019)
- Children: 1

Martin Michael Sellner (born 8 January 1989) is an Austrian far-right political activist, and leader of the Identitarian Movement of Austria, which he co-founded in 2012. He is considered to be a key figure in the Neue Rechte (New Right in German-speaking countries). Some also deem him to be part of the alt-right movement.

In March 2018, he was denied entry to, and deported from, the United Kingdom. A year later, he was denied entry to the United States because of a connection to the Christchurch shooter. In March 2024, the city of Potsdam tried to ban Sellner from entering Germany for 3 years, because of his speech on "remigration" at the 2023 Potsdam far-right meeting; that ban was revoked by a German court in late May 2024. Sellner has also promoted the Great Replacement conspiracy theory.

== Early life and education ==
Martin Michael Sellner was born in 1989 and raised outside of Vienna in the town of Baden by his father, a homeopath, and his mother, an English teacher. He became involved in nationalist politics as a teenager, being part of Austria's neo-Nazi scene. An early mentor of his was Gottfried Küssel, a well-known neo-Nazi figure.

In 2006, at the age of 17, Sellner admitted to placing swastika stickers with another person on a synagogue in Baden bei Wien, Lower Austria. Apart from the swastika stickers, others had the inscription "Legalise it" and the letters AJ (for "Aryan Youth"). The accomplice later stated in an interrogation that they had "wanted to do something" when they heard about the conviction of the British Holocaust denier David Irving. Sellner served 100 hours of community work at the Jewish cemetery in Baden, as part of an offer of the public prosecutor's office to renounce a criminal trial.

In 2008, at the age of 19, he helped a leading Austrian neo-Nazi group hinder liberal demonstrations and made pilgrimages to memorial services for Wehrmacht soldiers. Sellner has said that, until 2011, he was a neo-Nazi.

== Career and Activism ==
In 2012, he co-founded the Identitarian Movement of Austria, also referred to as "Generation Identity" in Austria, after discovering the French Bloc Identitaire on the internet. Sellner copied their aesthetics, the black-yellow logo and the central term of "saving European identity". Contacts in right-wing fraternities enabled him to convince sponsors of his new, right-wing radical youth group. He dropped out of law school, and by 2016 was studying philosophy in Vienna. By 2017 he had a bachelor in philosophy, and die Zeit referred to him as graphic designer. He said that he had broken with neo-Nazism, and that the rising popularity of Nazism was a failure of society.

In April 2016, he disrupted a theatre performance of Elfriede Jelinek's piece, Die Schutzbefohlenen (theatre performance with migrants seeking asylum), along with around 30 members of his organisation, spilling fake blood. The blood was intended to symbolize the "blood of Bataclan and Brussels".

In 2017, Sellner spoke at a Pegida rally in Dresden.

In May 2026 Sellner and Eva Vlaardingerbroek set up a petition titled "SaveEuropeAct", a proposed European Citizens' Initiative advocating an end to non-European immigration and the establishment of a Europe-wide remigration framework. He described the initiative as an effort to preserve the "ethnocultural continuity" of European nations. It received more than half a million signs till July the same year. The European commission commented on the petition, stating „it would constitute discrimination grounded on race and ethnic origin and be manifestly contrary to Article 21 of the Charter of Fundamental Rights of the European Union“.

=== Legal and visa problems ===
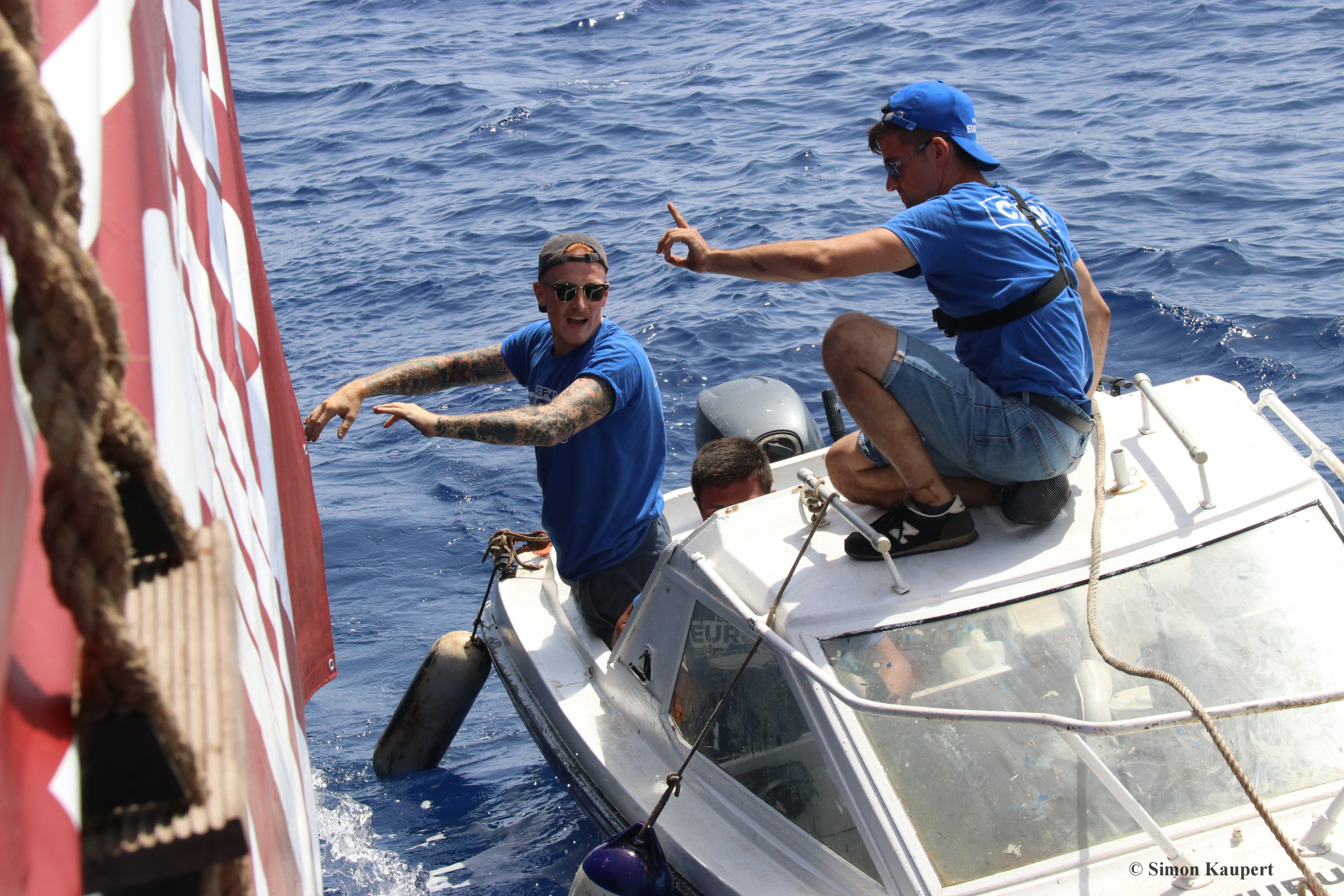
Sellner and other activists on a boat during the "Defend Europe" campaign in 2017

In February 2017, Sellner was involved in a fight in a Vienna U-Bahn station where he used pepper spray on people he described as far-left activists. Since this incident, he has been banned from carrying weapons.

In early 2018 he had received a donation of $1,500 from the Australian-born terrorist Brenton Tarrant of the March 2019 Christchurch mosque shootings in Christchurch, New Zealand.

In March 2018, Sellner and Brittany Pettibone, at that time his girlfriend, were denied entry to the United Kingdom at Luton Airport on the grounds that their presence in the United Kingdom was not conducive to the public good. Sellner intended to deliver an address at Speakers' Corner in Hyde Park, London. They were denied entry, detained for two days and deported.

In March 2019, Austrian police searched his home; unusually, they waited 12 minutes for him to open the door. Sellner apparently had been warned and managed to delete all emails with Christchurch shooter Tarrant 40 minutes before the raid. His computer, mobile phone, all data storage devices and cash cards were confiscated on suspicion that he was a member of a terrorist organization. Sellner denied any involvement in the attacks.

Also in March 2019, U.S. authorities canceled his permit to travel without a visa to the United States according to Sellner, thus preventing him from visiting Pettibone, now his wife. In 2019, the Republican Committee of Pettibone's home county of Kootenai County, Idaho, called on the American federal government to allow Sellner to travel to the United States. The move caused considerable controversy within the Republican Party and the State of Idaho. Sellner has said he wants to be allowed into the country so he and his fiancée could marry and live together in Post Falls, Idaho, rather than his native Austria; following this, their marriage was instead held in Austria later that year.

In June 2019, Austrian police expanded their searches of Sellner's property in connection with the March 2019 Christchurch shootings by Brenton Tarrant. According to media reports, Sellner commented that his electronic devices had been seized because police had a "strong suspicion of [Sellner] forming a terrorist organisation with Brenton Tarrant". A search warrant, which Sellner produced in a video on his YouTube channel, justified the search on the basis of Tarrant's "The Manifesto of The Great Replacement" and the suspicion of Sellner having collaborated with him. On 13 December 2019, a judge ruled that the searches were unlawful. Investigators had wrongly suspected Sellner of forming a terrorist organisation. According to the public prosecutor's office in Graz, inspection of Sellner's bank account was illegal for a lack of reasonable suspicion.

In June 2019, Sellner was permanently excluded from entering the UK on security grounds in a letter sent to him by the Home Office. A year earlier, Sellner had attempted to enter the UK via Stansted airport, but had been stopped by the authorities. The Home Secretary, Sajid Javid, feared that Sellner might try to enter the UK again to train the local branch of Generation Identity and carry out public stunts that would promote "anti-Islamic and anti-immigration narratives".

In 2023, Sellner proposed a plan to "remigrate" millions of people from Germany to North Africa at the 2023 Potsdam far-right meeting. The meeting also hosted members of the Alternative for Germany (AfD) party and the Christian Democratic Union of Germany (CDU) party, leading to debate on banning the AfD.

On 29 January 2024, Sellner entered Germany from Austria in a leased car. The police interrogated Sellner for nearly an hour before releasing him. On 19 March 2024, Sellner was banned from entering Germany for three years. According to German public media, Sellner had stated on his Twitter account that he would be "pushed back and punished" if he tried to enter Germany during the ban. The ban came after it was reported that Sellner had given a speech on "remigration" to politicians from the AfD and the CDU in Potsdam on 25 November 2023. A court in Potsdam revoked the ban in late May 2024 on Sellner's application, declaring the original ban unlawful.

On 16 March 2024, Sellner was arrested in Switzerland while he was giving a speech at an event organized by the Swiss organization Junge Tat in Tegerfelden. After an interrogation, Sellner was released on the condition that he leave the country immediately, which he did. According to media reports, a senior police officer in Zurich had warned Sellner in a telephone call the day before that the intended event "must not take place".

In 2026, he and Eva Vlaardingerbroek launched the Save Europe Act-campaign. The European Commission did not approve this as a European Citizens' Initiative, ruling that it violates the Charter of Fundamental Rights of the European Union.

In September 2026, Sellner founded an "Institute for Remigration" based in Magdeburg.

== Political views ==
As of 2017 Sellner has been regarded as a member of the alt-right movement. In 2017, Wolfgang Ullrich suggested that there are connections between Sellner's worldview and the theories of the philosopher Martin Heidegger and the political theorist Carl Schmitt.

ITV's 2017 documentary film investigation Undercover – The New British Far-Right claimed the existence of undercover footage of Sellner discussing contacts between Generation Identity and white supremacist groups in the United States, but stated that these contacts must be hidden due to public relations considerations. The documentary stated that Sellner said that Jews were a problem in the 1920s and made references to the "Jewish question". Sellner also said that the domination of the American alt-right by the "Jewish question" is a "complete strategical and theoretical failure". It stated that he said he was an antisemite in his youth, and that his friends made offensive comments about the Holocaust. It also stated that he had promoted the Great Replacement conspiracy theory. Sellner responded by calling the documentary a "hit piece", and that the statements were taken out of context. In a statement released by Generation Identity and Sellner, they stated that the group wants to preserve European "ethno-cultural identity" and stated that the group has no hidden agendas.

== Personal life ==
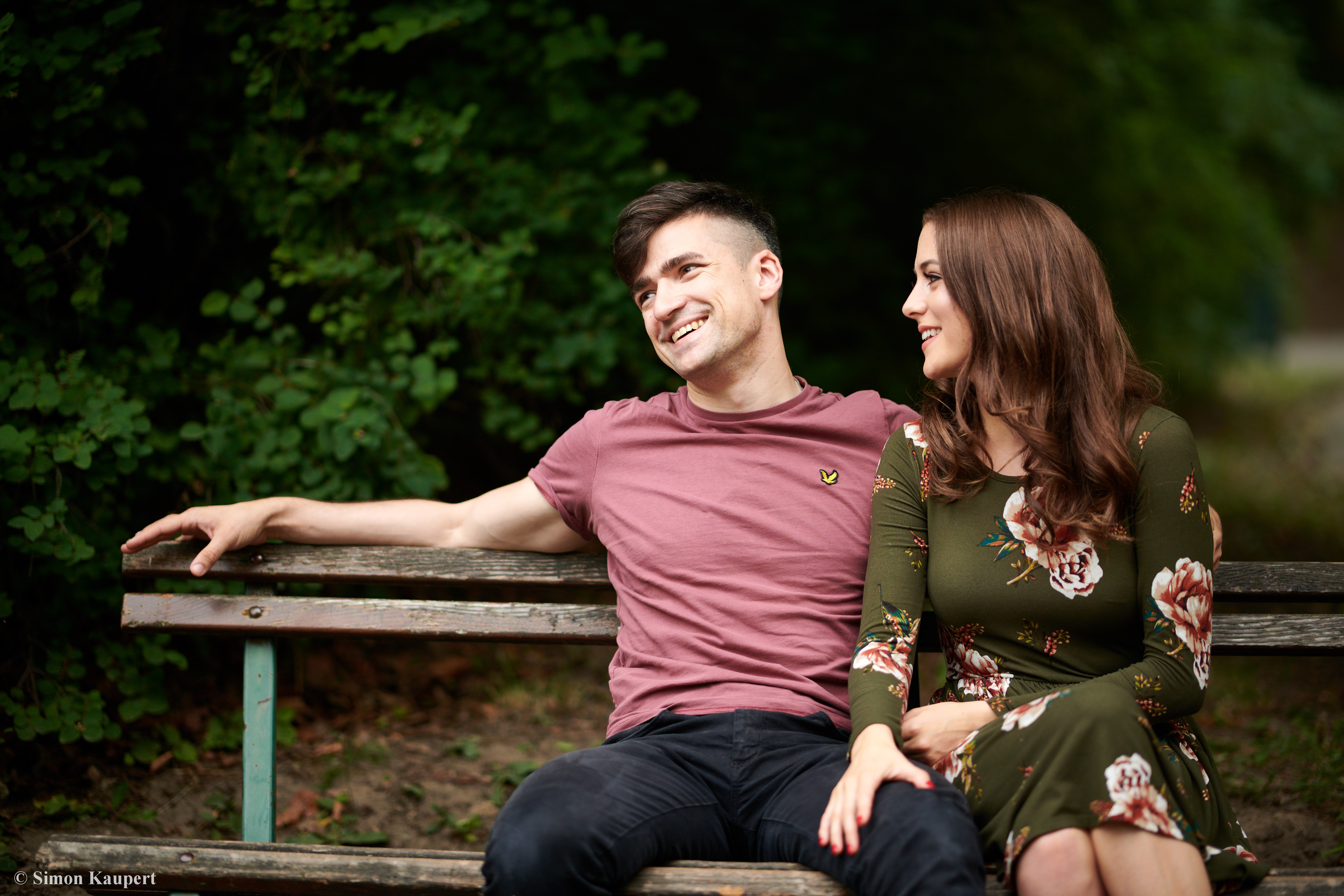
Sellner and Brittany Pettibone in 2018

Sellner states that he grew up in a middle-class area and family. According to an interview of his from a 2017 documentary, Sellner's parents are understanding and supportive of his career, although they would have preferred him pursuing his studies in law and are concerned about possible politically-motivated attacks on him.

In August of 2019, Sellner married Brittany Pettibone, an American alt-right vlogger and conspiracy theorist. The couple had their first child, a son, in 2021.

== Bibliography ==
- Sellner, Martin (2024). Remigration: ein Vorschlag. Schnellroda: Verlag Antaios. ISBN 978-3-949041-55-6.

=== Foreword ===
- Jean-Yves Le Gallou, Remigration : For the Europe for our Children, Arktos, 2026.
