= The New Spirit of Capitalism =

Book by Luc Boltanski and Ève Chiapello

The New Spirit of Capitalism (French: Le nouvel esprit du capitalisme) is a 1999 book by Luc Boltanski and Ève Chiapello. It was published in English by Verso in 2005 in a translation by Gregory Elliott. The book examines changes in capitalism and its justifying ideology from the late 1960s to the 1990s, particularly through a comparison of French management literature from the 1960s and 1990s.

Boltanski and Chiapello argue that capitalism renews its legitimacy by incorporating elements of the critiques directed against it and developing new reasons for participation in economic life. They describe the emergence of a "third spirit of capitalism" associated with flexible, network-based and project-oriented work. Extending the economies-of-worth framework developed by Boltanski and Laurent Thévenot, they propose a seventh order of worth, the "projective city", in which mobility, adaptability and the ability to form connections and move between projects are treated as signs of worth.

== Summary ==
Boltanski and Chiapello use the term "spirit of capitalism" for the ideology that gives people reasons to participate in capitalism. Because material reward or coercion alone cannot secure lasting commitment, capitalism must also present participation as stimulating, offer some degree of security and justify itself in terms of the common good. The authors distinguish three "historical spirits". The first was centred on the bourgeois entrepreneur and the family firm. The second was associated with salaried managers, large corporations, bureaucracy and long-term careers. The third developed alongside globalized capitalism, new technologies and network-based forms of organization.

Boltanski and Chiapello's use of the term draws on Max Weber. For Weber, the "spirit of capitalism" referred to ethical motivations, particularly the idea of work as a religious vocation, that encouraged people to engage steadily in capitalist accumulation. Boltanski and Chiapello retain Weber's argument that capitalism requires moral reasons for commitment, but broaden the term into a historically variable form that can contain different justifications at different stages of capitalism.

To examine the emergence of this newer spirit, the authors compare French management literature from the 1960s with texts from the 1990s. This method also draws on Weber, who used the writings of Benjamin Franklin as evidence for the spirit of early capitalism. Boltanski and Chiapello treat management texts as a similar form of advice literature describing how business ought to be conducted. The earlier literature was concerned with the management of large, hierarchical firms and with giving managers greater autonomy within them. By the 1990s, management writers instead promoted flexible organizations, smaller hierarchies, temporary teams and networks organized around projects.

Boltanski and Chiapello describe the system of values associated with this model as the "projective city". In this framework, worth is attached to the ability to form connections, move between projects, adapt to changing circumstances and remain employable. A highly valued person is flexible, mobile and able to involve others in new projects, while rigidity, permanent attachment to one position and dependence on established status are treated negatively.

The authors conclude that critique is one of the forces that transforms the spirit of capitalism. Capitalism draws on moral principles originating outside the pursuit of profit, including principles supplied by its critics, in order to justify participation and respond to accusations of injustice. These justifications can constrain capitalist practices, but they can also be incorporated into later forms of capitalism.

== Reception ==
The New Spirit of Capitalism attracted substantial attention beyond sociology and management studies. A 2013 Oxford University Press volume devoted to the book described it as a publishing success in France and later in Britain and the United States, and as a reference point in debates over the welfare state, collective action, social justice and market-oriented reform. The Alexander von Humboldt Foundation has characterized the book as pioneering within management and economic sociology.

In a later discussion of the book, political theorist Nancy Fraser described Boltanski and Chiapello's argument as original and profound, but criticized it as gender-blind. She argued that its emphasis on the autonomous and mobile worker did not adequately address the central role of women, care work and the replacement of the family-wage model by the two-earner household under neoliberal capitalism.
