= Recognition (sociology) =

Public acknowledgment of person's status or merits

Recognition is the public acknowledgment of a person's social status or merits (achievements, virtues, service, etc.). Another example is when some person is accorded some special status, such as title or classification.

== In politics ==
According to philosopher Charles Taylor, recognition of one's identity is both a fundamental need and a right, and non- or misrecognition is a form of oppression.

== In psychology ==
In the workplace, recognition has been suggested to increase employee engagement, continuous improvement behaviour, trust in the organization, intention to stay, and satisfaction with management. Others, like Alfie Kohn in Punished by Rewards, point out the dangers of using praise to show recognition, since it may induce compliance in the short-term, but negatively impact quality in the workplace long-term.

In psychology, excessively seeking for recognition is regarded as one of the defining traits of a narcissistic personality disorder.

== Recognition justice ==
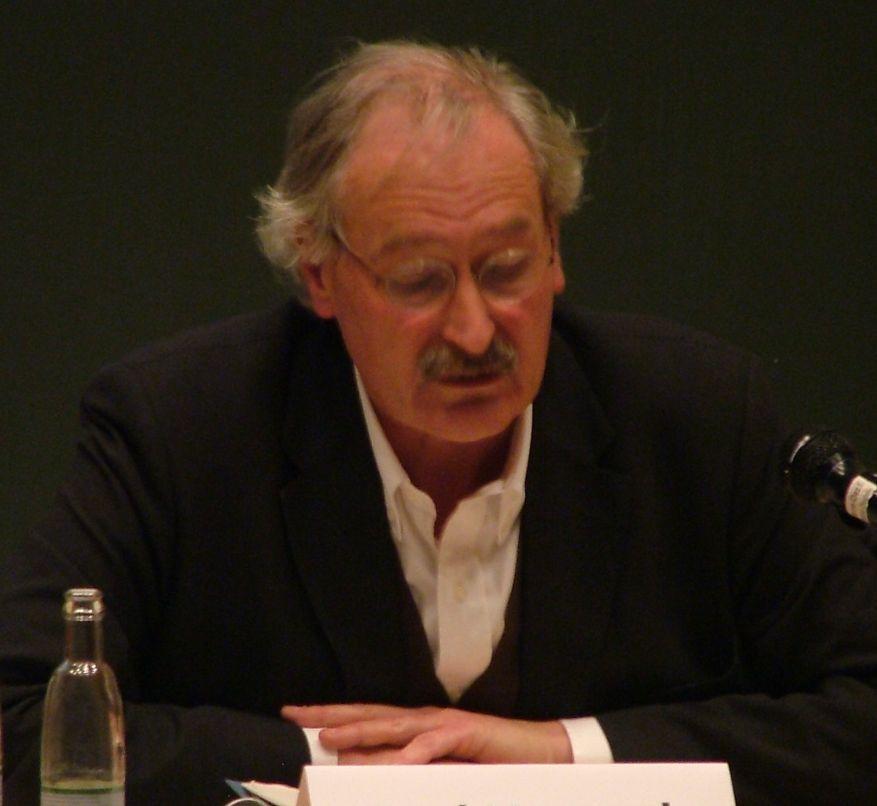
Axel Honneth

Recognition justice is a theory of social justice that emphasizes the recognition of human dignity and of difference between subaltern groups and the dominant society. Social philosophers Axel Honneth and Nancy Fraser point to a 21st-century shift in theories of justice away from distributive justice (which emphasises the elimination of economic inequalities) toward recognition justice and the eliminating of humiliation and disrespect. The shift is associated with the rise of identity politics.

The political implications of recognition justice are more ambiguous than distributive justice, because recognition is not a resource then can be redistributed, but is rather a phenomenological experience of people and groups. Honneth takes up the Hegelian idea that subjectivity is only fully constituted through intersubjective relationships, structured in different spheres of recognition—love, rights, and solidarity.

== See also ==
- Donor recognition wall
- Glory (honor)
- Name recognition
- Posthumous recognition
- Respect

Thinkers

- J. G. Fichte
- G. W. F. Hegel
- Michel Seymour
