= Progressive neoliberalism =

Progressive neoliberalism is a term that refers to the use of politically progressive rhetoric to support neoliberal policies.

== History ==
The term was coined by American philosopher Nancy Fraser in the mid-2010s.

== Definition ==
=== Characteristics ===
Fraser has defined progressive neoliberalism as the grafting of "a finance-centered political economy to a progressive politics of recognition." Ricardo Tranjan of the Canadian Centre for Policy Alternatives has described it as "governments that openly embrace equity and diversity ideals from social movements while actively defending corporate and financial sector interests."

=== Examples ===
Fraser holds that progressive neoliberalism first arose in the United States in the late 1980s and early 1990s, particularly with the ascent of the New Democrats and subsequent election of Bill Clinton as American president in 1992. Ricardo Tranjan of the Canadian Centre for Policy Alternatives further identifies Barack Obama, Tony Blair, and Justin Trudeau as progressive neoliberal heads of government.

Gianmarco Fifi of the London School of Economics has argued that the adoption of progressive neoliberalism by left-wing parties in Italy was driven by a refusal of protectionism, a desire to tackle long-term economic issues such as inflation, opposition to clientelism, and a desire for European integration.

== Debates ==
American feminist Johanna Brenner has argued that progressive neoliberalism is not a real phenomenon, saying that Fraser shifts "the analysis away from the capitalist class offensive that ushered in the neoliberal order" and "treats corporatist liberalism as representative of all movements, even though it is but one strain."

== See also ==
- Third Way
- The Old Is Dying and the New Cannot Be Born
- Sustainability Network
