= Jaeggi =

Jaeggi is a surname. Notable people with the surname include:

- Hugo Jaeggi (1936–2018), Swiss photographer
- Rahel Jaeggi (born 1967), Swiss philosopher, daughter of Urs
- Urs Jaeggi (1931–2021), Swiss sociologist, painter, and author

== See also ==
- Jaggi
