= Robert Pfaller =

Austrian philosopher

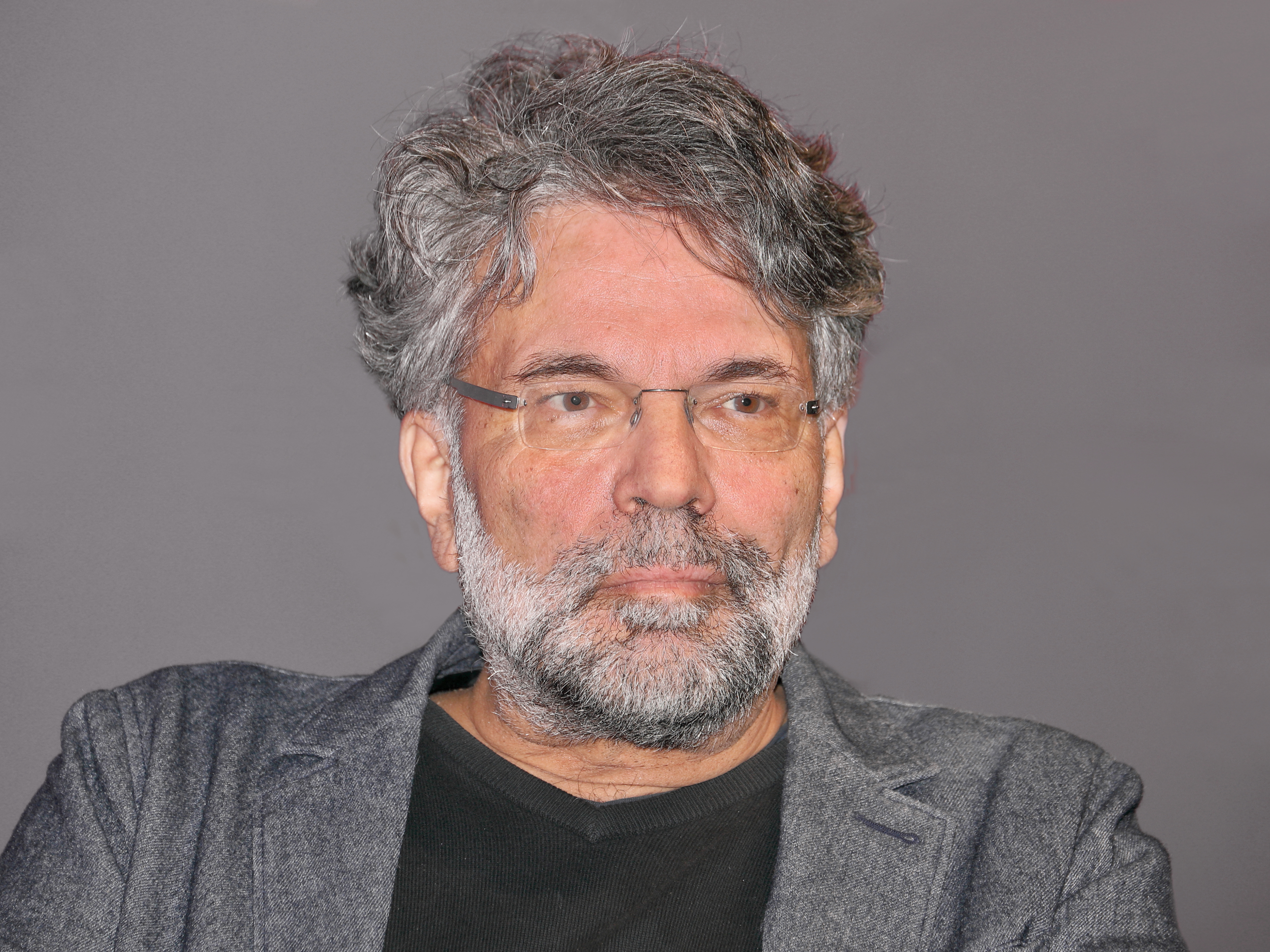
- Robert Pfaller (2025)
- Born: 1962 (age 63–64); Vienna

Academic background
- Education: University of Vienna (PhD); University of Art and Design Linz (habil.)
- Thesis: Die List der Epistemologischen Vernunft: zur Philosophie Louis Althussers (1993)

Academic work
- Era: Contemporary philosophy
- Discipline: Philosophy, cultural studies
- Region: Western philosophy
- Institutions: University of Art and Design Linz; University of Applied Arts Vienna; TU Wien
- Website: robert-pfaller.com

Robert Pfaller (born 1962 in Vienna) is an Austrian professor of philosophy.

Pfaller initially taught as a professor of philosophy and cultural studies at the University of Art and Design Linz and at the Vienna University of Technology. From 2009 to October 2014, he was professor of philosophy at the University of Applied Arts Vienna. Since 2019, he has been professor of philosophy at the University of Art and Design Linz.

== Work ==
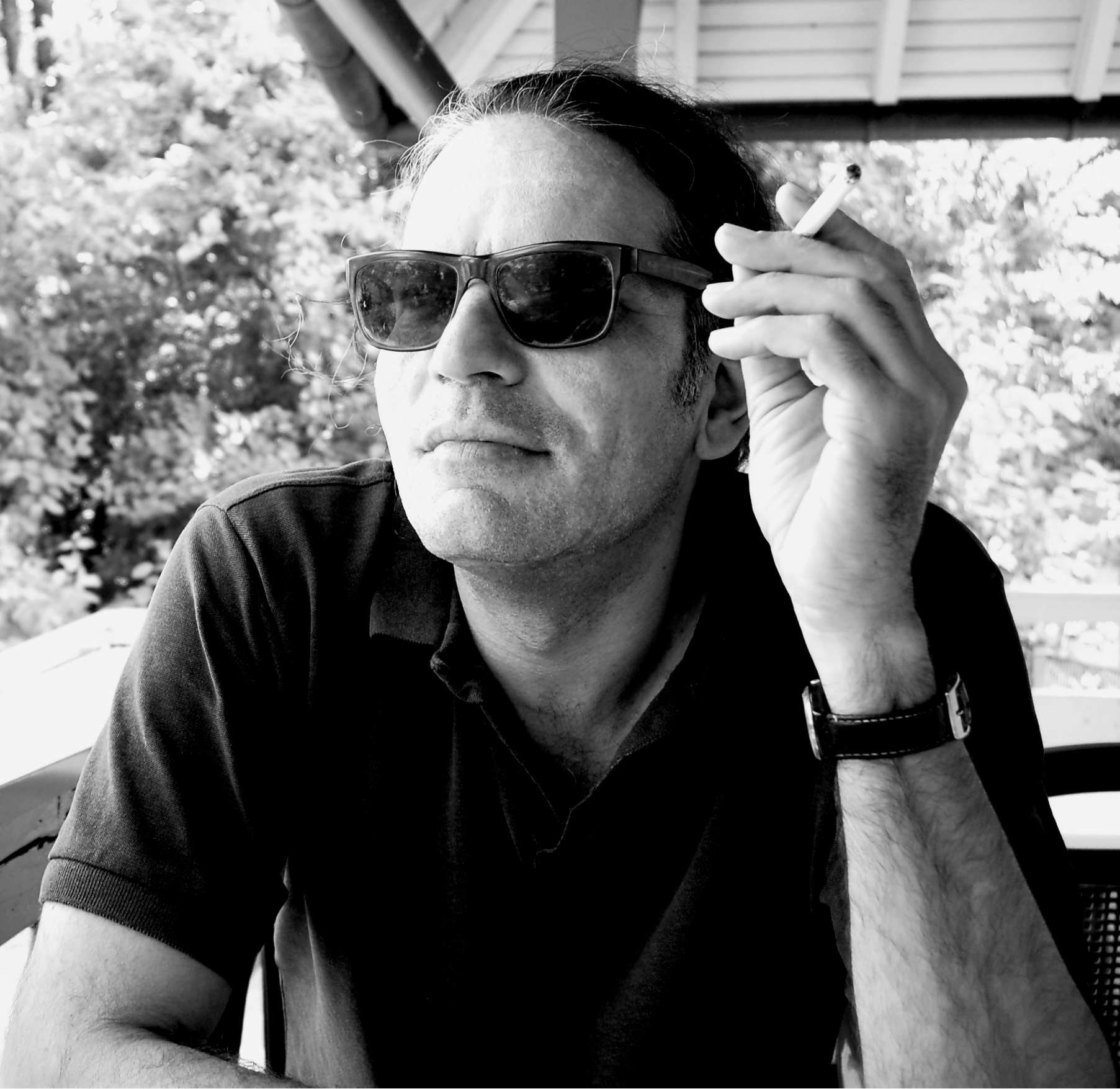
Robert Pfaller (2016)

Pfaller gained international recognition for his studies on interpassivity (2000). Interpassivity refers to the practice of delegating one's own actions and feelings to external objects, i.e., people or things. The theory of interpassivity mainly relates to the realm of pleasurable sensations, which is why interpassivity can also be described as "delegated enjoyment". A common example of this from everyday life is the canned laughter in sitcoms analyzed by Slavoj Žižek, which laughs in our place and thus saves us the "effort" of laughing ourselves. We feel as liberated as if the laughter had been our own.

In his work Die Illusionen der anderen (The Illusions of Others), Pfaller develops the thesis that there are delusions that cannot be attributed to a specific person, based in part on the psychoanalytic considerations of Octave Mannoni and Johan Huizinga's cultural theory of play (see Homo Ludens). In this context, Pfaller speaks of "illusions without owners". Based on Mannoni's distinction between "croyance" and "foi", Pfaller distinguishes between two types of delusions: delusions with owners ("that is my opinion and I stand by it") and delusions without owners. The latter are delusions "despite better knowledge", which cannot be rationally justified for the individual and are expressed in everyday myths and superstitions, for example in statements such as: "I know it's stupid, but I still absolutely have to know what my horoscope says." On the contrary, this "better knowledge" not only fails to dispel the superstition, it actually reinforces it. These delusions without owners deceive a fictional "naive observer" – an assumed observer within the self who is guided only by outward appearances and can therefore be deceived.

Pfaller sees today's neoliberal culture—on the part of the masses—as characterized by asceticism and the avoidance of pleasure. The renunciation of pleasure becomes the pleasure of renunciation. Pfaller takes up this idea, which goes back to Max Weber and his work The Protestant Ethic, primarily in the psychological interpretation and reworking of Gilles Deleuze and Félix Guattari. In their book Anti-Oedipus, they write: "Thus, the fundamental question of political philosophy remains the one that Spinoza knew how to ask (and that Wilhelm Reich rediscovered): Why do people fight for their servitude as if it were their salvation? What causes one to cry out: "More taxes! Less bread!" And, one might add, why don't they shout the words of Vladimir Mayakovsky: "Give us the good life"? Pfaller thus sees in the present day a loss of the ability of subjects to adequately perceive their interests—instead of the objects themselves, quite unlike in classical Protestant ethics, renunciation is desired: "We don't have a Porsche, and that's a good thing."

Until around 1980, Keynesianism was the dominant political ideology in Western countries in Europe and overseas. This led to increasing social equality (see Thomas Piketty and Branko Milanović). With the emergence of the neoliberal Chicago School, there was a radical reversal of this trend (austerity policy). Both right-wing and social democratic governments pursue neoliberal policies in the same way. Now the left-wing parties had to start differentiating themselves from the right, at least symbolically. Under the pressure of austerity measures, politics could no longer intervene in the shaping of society. The grand political narrative was lost; "diversity" replaced equality. As social conflicts became culturalized, they also became miniaturized. Public discourse focused on smaller issues (microaggressions) and increasingly smaller groups. Previously, it was about all people, then women, homosexuals, etc. Culturalization meant that the disadvantaged were now also seen as a sensitive group. This is a thoroughly paradoxical turn of events: those who are actually left behind are hardened and do not care about trivialities. All issues of class-based inequality were now understood as issues of discrimination. Pfaller sees identity politics as rooted in a society in decline. "... those who have no future need their origins all the more".

Pfaller sees a mistake in the distinction made in anthropology, whereby shame is about external accusations (directed at the opinions of others) and guilt is about internal ones (dictated by one's own conscience); this distinction is based on Margaret Mead's work and has been widely accepted since the 1930s. Shame is just as internally driven as guilt, but it is based on external factors (toilet accidents, stains on one's shirt). Shame is related to one's being, and its positive counterpart is pride (in the case of guilt, dignity). Shame is itself shameful and therefore hides behind other masks (boasting, pathological ambition). Today, shame is a distinguishing feature; it is carried around like an expensive handbag. Shame is always a little foreign to oneself; one cannot really impose it on others. Shame erupts when people can no longer pretend that they haven't noticed anything. This theater doesn't really fool anyone; it has no real audience, but is staged for an inner psychological observer who judges only by appearances ("naive observer", referred to by Pfaller as the "lower self"). This is a significant difference from the superego, which also knows our intentions or actions that have not been carried out. Another misconception about shame is that it is a distance from an ideal that cannot be achieved. If, as in cancel culture, something has to go, then there is something too much there. The basic feeling of shame is: I am superfluous in society, I am too much.

Pfaller also sees changes in the world of work: authors Luc Boltanski and Ève Chiapello argue that work and non-work can hardly be separated, and that there is such a thing as artist capitalism:

- The job responsibilities are vaguely defined and unclear.
- An enormous willingness to work hard is required.
- Payment for the work is uncertain.

In his book Zwei Enthüllungen über die Scham (Two Revelations about Shame), published in 2022 by Westend Verlag, Pfaller describes the book Schäm dich! Wie Ideologinnen und Ideologen bestimmen, was gut und böse ist (Shame on you! How ideologues determine what is good and evil) by Judith Sevinç Basad, who now works for Nius, as a knowledgeable presentation and its criticism as well-founded, contrary to many other reviews that take the opposite view.

== Initiatives ==
In 2013, Pfaller was one of the first supporters of the Austrian initiative "Mein Veto! – Bürger gegen Bevormundung" (My Veto! – Citizens Against Patronizing) and one of the founders of the European initiative "Adults for Adults. Citizens against Patronizing Politics." Both action groups opposed (in Pfaller's own words) "three aspects of current EU policy", namely "patronizing politics", "biopolitics", and "pseudopolitics". In September 2013, members of the European Parliament received a letter signed by Pfaller from the "Adults for Adults" initiative calling on them to vote against the planned tightening of the EU Tobacco Directive. For parodic effect, "a bottle of French red wine with a label showing shocking warning images of liver damage" was enclosed.

== Psychoanalysis research group ==
Pfaller was a founding member of the Vienna-based psychoanalysis research group stuzzicadenti. The group was founded in 1999 and existed until 2022. The group focused on the critical question of the goal of treatment: healing or adaptation to existing social norms? To this end, clinical questions were linked to questions of cultural theory about changed and changeable understandings of sexuality, normality, and pathology.

== Publications ==
- Althusser. Das Schweigen im Text. Epistemologie, Psychoanalyse und Nominalismus in Louis Althussers Theorie der Lektüre. Fink, München 1997, ISBN 3-7705-3115-9.
- Negation and its Reliabilities. An empty subject for ideology? In: Slavoj Žižek (Hrsg.): Cogito and the Unconscious. Duke University Press, Durham 1998, S. 225–246.
- als Herausgeber: Interpassivität. Studien über delegiertes Genießen. Springer, Berlin 2000, ISBN 3-211-83303-X.
- Die Illusionen der anderen. Über das Lustprinzip in der Kultur. Suhrkamp, Frankfurt am Main 2002, ISBN 3-518-12279-7.
- als Herausgeber: Schluss mit der Komödie! Zur schleichenden Vorherrschaft des Tragischen in unserer Kultur. Sonderzahl, Wien 2005, ISBN 3-85449-226-X.
- Das schmutzige Heilige und die reine Vernunft. Symptome der Gegenwartskultur. Fischer Taschenbuch, Frankfurt am Main 2008, ISBN 978-3-596-17729-5.
- Ästhetik der Interpassivität. Philo Fine Arts, Hamburg 2009, ISBN 978-3-86572-650-6.
- als Herausgeber mit Beate Hofstadler: Hätten Sie mal Feuer? Löcker, Wien 2012, ISBN 978-3-85409-642-9.
- Wofür es sich zu leben lohnt. Elemente materialistischer Philosophie. S. Fischer, Frankfurt am Main 2011; Taschenbuch ebd. 2012, ISBN 978-3-596-18903-8.
- Zweite Welten. Und andere Lebenselixiere. S. Fischer, Frankfurt am Main 2012, ISBN 978-3-10-059034-3.
- als Herausgeber mit Eva Laquièze-Waniek: Die letzten Tage der Klischees. Übertragungen in Psychoanalyse, Kunst und Gesellschaft. Turia + Kant, Wien/Berlin 2013, ISBN 978-3-85132-726-7.
- Kurze Sätze über gutes Leben. Fischer Taschenbuch, Frankfurt am Main 2015, ISBN 978-3-596-18917-5.
- Erwachsenensprache. Über ihr Verschwinden aus Politik und Kultur. Fischer, Frankfurt am Main 2017, ISBN 978-3-10-490443-6 / ISBN 978-3-596-29877-8.
- Die blitzenden Waffen: Über die Macht der Form. Fischer, Frankfurt am Main 2020, ISBN 978-3-10-059035-0.
- Zwei Enthüllungen über die Scham. Fischer, Frankfurt am Main 2022, ISBN 978-3-10-397137-8.
- Das Lachen der Ungetäuschten. Die philosophische Würde der Komödie. Fischer, Frankfurt am Main 2025, ISBN 978-3-10-397681-6.

== Awards ==
In 2007, Robert Pfaller was awarded The Missing Link. PSZ Prize for Psychoanalysis and... for his book Die Illusionen der anderen (The Illusions of Others). This prize was established by the Psychoanalytical Seminar Zurich (PSZ) on the occasion of its 30th anniversary and was awarded for the first time in 2007. The American Board and Academy of Psychoanalysis (ABAPsa) awarded Pfaller the Award for Best Books Published in 2014 for the English version of his study Die Illusionen der anderen. Über das Lustprinzip in der Kultur (On the Pleasure Principle in Culture: Illusions Without Owners).

In 2020, he was awarded the Paul Watzlawick Ring of Honor, donated by the Vienna Medical Association, by jury decision.

In 2023, Pfaller was appointed a corresponding member of the Slovenian Academy of Sciences and Arts (SAZU).

== Literature ==
- Helmut Mauró: Das wahre Leben spielt an der Oberfläche. Rezension. In: Süddeutsche Zeitung, 10 July 2020, S. 11.
- Wolfgang Schoberth: „Was glaubt eigentlich der Glaube?" Eine theologische Kritik von Pfallers Delegationsmodell. In: Silvan Wagner (Hrsg.): Interpassives Mittelalter? Interpassivität in mediävistischer Diskussion. (= Bayreuther Beiträge zur Literaturwissenschaft, Bd. 34). Peter Lang, Frankfurt am Main 2015, ISBN 978-3-631-66225-0, S. 211–241.
