= Wall of honor =

Wall of honor may refer to:

- Donor recognition wall, where financial donations are honored.
- A type of memorial.
- National LGBTQ Wall of Honor, in New York City, New York.
- Milwaukee Brewers Wall of Honor, at Miller Park in Milwaukee, Wisconsin.
- Global War on Terrorism (GWOT) Wall of Honor dedicated to military service members who were killed in action since 9/11, primarily in Afghanistan and Iraq. A traveling tribute based in Albany, Oregon
