= Axel Honneth =

German philosopher (born 1949)

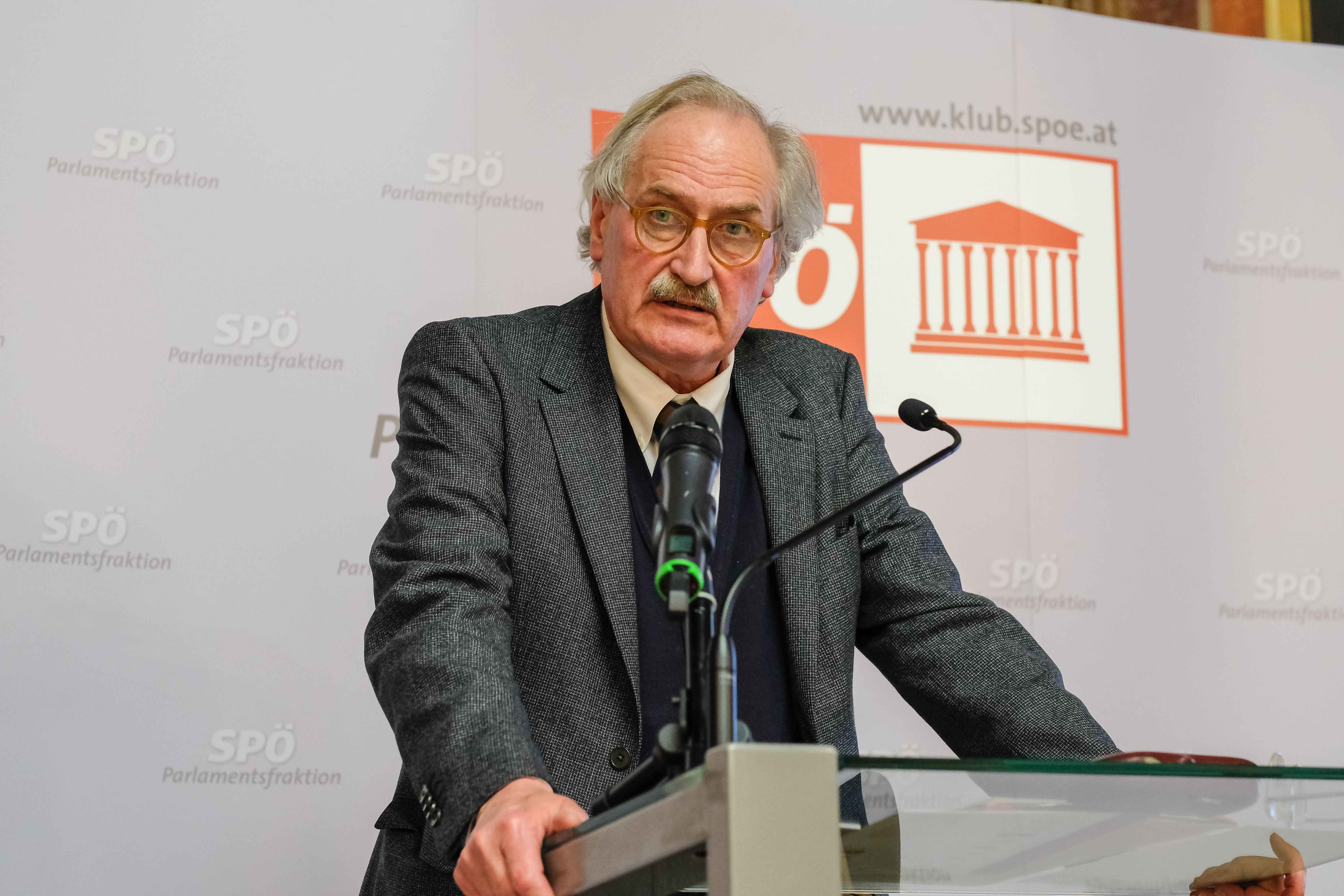
- Honneth in 2016
- Born: 18 July 1949 (age 77); Essen, West Germany

Education
- Education: University of Bonn; Ruhr University Bochum; Free University of Berlin
- Thesis: Kritik der Macht. Foucault und die kritische Theorie (1983)
- Doctoral advisor: Urs Jaeggi
- Other advisor: Jürgen Habermas

Philosophical work
- Era: Contemporary philosophy
- Region: Western philosophy
- School: Continental philosophy; Frankfurt School; Neopragmatism
- Institutions: Goethe University Frankfurt; Free University of Berlin; Columbia University
- Doctoral students: Carolin Emcke; Rahel Jaeggi; Harald Lemke; Hartmut Rosa
- Main interests: Political philosophy; social philosophy; moral philosophy; critical theory; recognition
- Notable ideas: Recognition justice

Axel Honneth (/ˈhɒnɛt/; German: [ˈaksl̩ ˈhɔnɛt]; born 18 July 1949) is a German philosopher working in the tradition of critical theory, who is the Professor for Social Philosophy at Goethe University Frankfurt and the Jack B. Weinstein Professor of the Humanities in the department of philosophy at Columbia University. He directed the University of Frankfurt Institute for Social Research between 2001 and 2018.

== Biography ==
Honneth was born in Essen, West Germany, on 18 July 1949. He studied philosophy, sociology and German studies at the University of Bonn, Ruhr University Bochum and the Free University of Berlin from 1969 to 1976. He was a research assistant at the Institute of Sociology of the Free University of Berlin from 1977 to 1982. He completed his doctoral dissertation on Michel Foucault and critical theory, supervised by Urs Jaeggi at the Free University of Berlin, in 1983, while on a year-long fellowship at the Max Planck Institute for the Study of the Scientific and Technical World in Starnberg, then under director Jürgen Habermas. (Note: One source names Michael Theunissen as a co-advisor, possibly examiner, of Honneth's dissertation.) He was then hired as assistant professor in Habermas's research group at the Goethe University Frankfurt, where he co-taught seminars with Habermas from 1983 to 1989.

Honneth was a fellow at the Berlin Institute for Advanced Study for a year (1989–1990) before completing his habilitation at the LMU in 1990. He then taught philosophy at the University of Konstanz (1991–1992) and political philosophy at the Free University of Berlin (1992–1995), and was a visiting professor at the New School for Social Research in New York City (1995–1996). In 1996, he assumed the chair in social philosophy at the Goethe University Frankfurt (previously held by Habermas). He also held the Spinoza Chair of Philosophy at the University of Amsterdam in 1999.

Between 2001 and 2018 he was director of the Institute for Social Research, originally home to the so-called Frankfurt School, at the University of Frankfurt. Since 2011, he is also Jack B. Weinstein Professor of the Humanities at the department of philosophy at Columbia University in the City of New York.

Honneth is co-editor of numerous specialist journals, including the Deutschen Zeitschrift für Philosophie, the European Journal of Philosophy and the journal Constellations. From 2007 to 2017, Honneth was President of the Internationale Hegel-Vereinigung (International Hegel Association).

== Research ==
Honneth's work focuses on social-political and moral philosophy, especially relations of power, recognition, and respect. One of his core arguments is for the priority of intersubjective relationships of recognition in understanding social relations. This includes non- and mis-recognition as a basis of social and interpersonal conflict. For instance, grievances regarding the distribution of goods in society are ultimately struggles for recognition justice.

His first main work The Critique of Power: Reflective Stages in a Critical Social Theory explores the affinities between the Frankfurt School and Michel Foucault. In his second main work The Struggle for Recognition: Moral Grammar of Social Conflicts, the recognition concept is derived mainly from G. W. F. Hegel's early social philosophical works, but is supplemented by George Herbert Mead's social psychology, Jürgen Habermas' communicative ethics, and Donald Winnicott's object relations theory. Honneth's critical adaptation of these is the basis of his critical social theory, which attempts to remedy the deficits of previous approaches. In 2003, Honneth co-authored Recognition or Redistribution? with the feminist philosopher Nancy Fraser, who criticizes the priority of ethical categories such as recognition over structural social-political categories such as redistribution in Honneth's thought. His recent work Reification reformulates this key "Western Marxist" concept in terms of intersubjective relations of recognition and power. For Honneth, all forms of reification are due to intersubjectively based pathologies rather than the structural character of social systems such as capitalism as argued by Karl Marx and György Lukács.

In The Idea of Socialism, Honneth calls for a revision of socialist theory in order to make it relevant for the 21st century, based on a criticism of the socialist theory of historical materialism, ignorance of political rights and social differentiation in modern societies, and overemphasis on the working class as a revolutionary subject. In order to fully realize the three principles of the French Revolution, Honneth suggests three revisions: replacing economic determinism with historical experimentation inspired by John Dewey, expanding social freedom – mutual dependence and cooperation among members of society – to the other spheres of modern society (i.e. the political and the private), as well as addressing all citizens of the democratic sphere.

== Works translated into English ==
- Social Action and Human Nature, co-authored with Hans Joas (Cambridge University Press, 1988 [1980]).
- The Critique of Power: Reflective Stages in a Critical Social Theory (MIT Press, 1991 [1985]).
- The Fragmented World of the Social: Essays in Social and Political Philosophy (SUNY Press, 1995 [1990]).
- The Struggle for Recognition: The Moral Grammar of Social Conflicts (Polity Press, 1995 [1992]).
- Redistribution or Recognition?: A Political-Philosophical Exchange, co-authored with Nancy Fraser (Verso, 2003).
- Reification: A Recognition-Theoretical View (Oxford University Press, 2007).
- Disrespect: The Normative Foundations of Critical Theory (Polity Press, 2007 [2000]).
- Pathologies of Reason: On the Legacy of Critical Theory (2009).
- The Pathologies of Individual Freedom: Hegel's Social Theory (2010).
- The I in We: Studies in the Theory of Recognition (2012).
- Freedom's Right (2014).
- The Idea of Socialism (2016).
- The Poverty of Our Freedom (Polity Press, 2020).
- The Working Sovereign: Labour and Democratic Citizenship (Polity Press, 2024).

== See also ==
- Critical theory
- Recognition (sociology)
- Social exclusion
- Charles Taylor (philosopher)
