= Doris Schoettler-Boll =

German artist (1945–2015)

Doris Schöttler-Boll
- Born: 3 January 1945; Noerdlingen
- Occupation: artist

Doris Schöttler-Boll (born 3 January 1945 in Noerdlingen; died 29 January 2015 in Essen) was a German artist. She is known for her de-constructivist works that she initially described as a result of Photomontage and Collage.

== Life and work ==
=== Studying art in Essen and Düsseldorf (with Josef Beuys) ===
In the 1960s, Doris Schöttler-Boll lived in Bochum where her husband Peter Schöttler was enrolled in the history department of the Ruhr University Bochum. She studied art at the Folkwang University of the Arts, an art academy in Essen. Simultaneously she was attending lectures in Bochum and was an avid cinéaste who spent much time seeing art films at the Bochum university film club.

Having graduated at the Folkwang academy, she continued her professional education at the Kunstakademie Düsseldorf (Düsseldorf art academy) as a student of Joseph Beuys from 1970 till 1974. Simultaneously she was a key rent strike activist in Bochum, and worked as an artist with the children of the people of the large ‘Girondelle’ tenement house who were continuing their rent-strike. She was bringing paper and crayons or water colors and encouraged the children to express their wishes and longings visually.

=== The years in Paris ===
When she had completed her studies at the Düsseldorf art academy, Doris Schöttler-Boll went to Paris with her husband who was a student and a translator of Louis Althusser. Since the mid-1970s, she met Jacques Derrida, Pierre Macherey, Étienne Balibar and Louis Althusser, being occasionally invited to their homes together with Peter Schöttler.

Before she went to Paris, she wrote Derrida that she was compelled to ‘steal’ his concept of deconstruction because it amounted to reductionism if she would describe her way of working simply as collage/montage. It was then, in the mid-1970s, that she started to work as a professional (‘free’ and ‘free-lance’) artist; something she continues to do.

=== A professional artist, curator, and feminist art teacher in Bremen ===
In 1979, Doris Schöttler-Boll went to Bremen, working as an artist but also teaching art and art-related subjects at the University of Bremen from 1979 to 1986. Her courses and exhibitions focused largely on feminist and civil rights issues. An art project and parallel course focused on gender culminated in an exhibition titled Hair – Or Looking for Traces of the Female (Haare, oder Spurensuche des Weiblichen).

Another project reflecting identity led to the exhibition Photo Albums, Portraits, Mug Shots (Photoalbum, Porträtphotographie, Polizeiphotographie; 1980). It predated a similarly focused exhibition in the Center for Art and Media Karlsruhe ( ZKM Zentrum für Kunst und Medientechnologie in Karlsruhe, Germany) by approximately two decades.

The courses on Women and Art (Frauen und Kunst) led to an exhibition with the same title (Frauen und Kunst, 1982) in the Weserburg, as well as a small catalogue. Since this point, Doris Schöttler-Boll, who collaborated with noted artists, has worked with children, housewives, students and budding artists.

=== Again, Essen ===
In 1985, Doris Schöttler-Boll was invited to stay in Essen as Artist-in-residence. Here, she lived and worked in Borbeck castle (Schloss Borbeck). During her time in Borbeck she organized the exhibition "Unter einem Himmel (Beneath one and the same sky, 1988)," which received considerable media attention. The exhibition featured two artists at a time, a male and a female artist who shared aesthetic interests. The male/female juxtaposition was expected to let the public discover gender-specific traits in their work. Nan Hoover (1931–2008) exhibited together with Harald Falkenhagen, Doris Schöttler-Boll with Timm Ulrichs. Other participants were Tony Morgan, Eu Nim Ro, Norbert Schwontkowski, Toto Frima, etc.

In the summer of 1988, the jury (Atelier-Vergabegremium) of the municipal Museum Folkwang in Essen decided to give Doris Schöttler-Boll a specific form of support that had been awarded already to HA Schult and Herbert Lungwitz: a rent-free, timewise unlimited stay in a municipal ‘art house’ (Atelierhaus). Schult had been given a space at the former Kaiser Otto School. Schöttler-Boll was offered a space at the former Pestalozzi School. This ‘Atelier’ House had been a home for the sculptor Lungwitz “since the (early) 1980s.” She renovated the studio, and the space where she lives, at her own expenses and pays for heating and water only. But in return for the benefit of being a recipient of such support for artists (Kuenstlerfoerderung), she is very actively engaged in conceiving and organizing projects open to the public, most notably a series of presentations titled “Persons-Projects-Perspectives’ (since 9/9/1999).

Since 1996 Doris Schöttler-Boll has been a member of the Westdeutsche Künstlerbund, the Federation of West German Artists.

In addition to her creative work, Doris Schöttler-Boll has been conceiving, organizing and curating art-related projects at the Atelierhaus für Kunst, Medien und Kommunication (Art house for the visual arts, media and communication) in Essen-Steele. She initiated and curated expositions of young and not so young artists, was the prime mover of art projects involving children and adolescents and invited such noted artists as Harun Farocki, Urs Jaeggi, D. E. Sattler etc. to present their ideas, talk about their work, and engage in debate with the public. These presentations (under the general title "Persons, Projects, Perspectives") focused on painting, film, literature, art theory and practice, the possibilities of "intervention" in society, the social situation of artists and the circumstances which further or negatively affect the creation of art.

== Single exhibitions (a selection) ==
In August and September, 1987, Doris Schöttler-Boll had a noted solo exhibition at the Landesmuseum Bonn (the main museum of modern art in Bonn, then the capital of West Germany). The exhibition, entitled Dekonstruktionen oder vom Widersprechen in Bildern (Dekonstructions or Contradicting by way of images), was curated by Professor Klaus Honnef, an art historian focused on photo art / art photography.

Subsequently, she also had solo-exhibitions at the Clemens-Sels-Museum in Neuss (the twin city of Düsseldorf, on the left bank of the Rhine) and at the Museum Bochum in Bochum, Germany.

== Group exhibitions (a selection) ==
- Unter einem Himmel (with Harald Falkenhagen, Nan Hoover, Tony Morgan, Eu-Nim Roh, Norbert Schwontkowski, Doris Schöttler-Boll, Timm Ulrichs, et al.), Gallery of Schloss Borbeck, Essen (1985)
- Schattengrenze (with Rose Finn-Kelcey, Alison Knowles, Pat Olesko, Ulrike Rosenbach, Doris Schöttler-Boll and others) at the Weserburg in Bremen (1985)
- Benutzen Fotos (with Harald Falkenhagen, Norbert Schwontkowski, Doris Schöttler-Boll...) at Forum Boettcherstrasse, Bremen (1986)
- L'Art Allemand aujourd'hui at the Gallery of the European Council, EU-Building, Brussels (1988)
- Der Raum (with Jürgen Albrecht, Susanne Bollenhagen, U. Dürrenfeld, Harald Frackmann, Joachim Fliegner, Werner Fröning, Markus Felthaus, Barbara Hamann, Marikke Heinz-Hoek, Ute Ihlenfeldt, Gabriele Konsor, Thomas Kaufhold, Michael Lapuks, Hartmut Neumann, Li Portenlänger, Doris Schöttler-Boll, Wolfgang Spengler, Norbert Schwontkowski, Otto Völker, Wolfgang Wagner-Kutschker), Gesellschaft für aktuelle Kunst (GAK), Bremen, Sept.-Oct.1987.
- Wo bleibst du, Revolution? (with Eduardo Arroyo, Jochen Gerz, Jiří Hilmar, Urs Jaeggi, Tadeusz Kantor, Jiří Kolář, Doris Schöttler-Boll, Klaus Staeck, et al.), Museum Bochum, Bochum (1989)

Other exhibitions (solo or group exhibitions) took place at the Kunstamt Neukoelln (Berlin), the Fotoforum Bremen (Bremen), the Steintorgalerie (Bremen), the Weserburg museum (Bremen), the Museum Ehrenhof (Düsseldorf), the Museum Gelsenkirchen (Gelsenkirchen), the Studio of Schloss Oberhausen (Oberhausen), the Stollwerkfabrik (Cologne), etc.

Both the art journal Weltkunst (Global Art) and a feminist journal, EMMA (magazine) (edited by Alice Schwarzer) noted her exhibition in Neuss.

The exhibition Toto Frima (Amsterdam) und Doris Schöttler-Boll (Bremen) that took place in the "Fotoforum,“ a museum in Bremen, was mentioned by Fotomagazin (Jg. 1984) and in Bremische Chronik.

In Essen, the noted architect Werner Ruhnau who had already collaborated with Yves Klein when he did the new Musiktheater im Revier (situated at the Kennedy Square in Gelsenkirchen) chose Doris Schöttler-Boll and Monika Guenther as collaborating artists when he redesigned the Grillo Theater.

In the summer of 2012, photocollages/montages of Doris Schöttler-Boll were shown at the Staedtische Galerie Bremen (Bremen municipal gallery) in an exhibition entitled Tiefenschaerfe that included works by Christian Boltanski, Remigiusz Borda, Pierre Boucher, Ger Dekkers, Harald Falkenhagen, Marikke Heinz-Hoek, Jaschi Klein, Claudia Medeiros Cardoso, Sigmar Polke, Norbert Schwontkowski, and Wols, among others. The opening speech was given by noted art historian Klaus Honnef.

== Critique ==
Professor Klaus Honnef, a noted expert on photography as an art form, presented a large solo exhibition of her work in Bonn, West Germany. Josef Beuys wrote about her artistic approach that it avoids both rigid Aestheticism and one-sided political statement. The merit of such an approach was considerable in his opinion.

Commenting on her works exhibited in 1987 in the Bonn Landesmuseum, Prof. Klaus Honnef explained that Schöttler-Boll “is aware of the secret seductive power of photography, which ‘we put our faith in,’ as André Bazin wrote. She knows about this fascination and yet, she does not succumb to it. But she does not high-handedly assume to possess that Archimedean theorem or position which would allow her to expose the illusionary quality of photographic worlds of images. She knows, after all, that these worlds reflect social existence and consciousness.” Honnef noted that the artist had made use of “fragments of commercial imagery” (Versatzstücke kommerzieller Bilderwelten) when she created the works chosen for the exhibition. “She relies on collage and montage and takes a photo of the result in order to close the gaps in the surface. Despite the fact that she uses a pair of scissors to destroy the original material, she never proceeds in an aggressive manner.”

Prof. Marianne Schuller discussed the assemblage that Schöttler-Boll had completed for the Grillo-Theater (rebuilt and modernized by the architect Werner Ruhnau). Schöttler-Boll's work is dedicated to two tragic German dramatists, Heinrich von Kleist (1777–1811), a Prussian citizen driven to suicide by an utterly wrong socio-cultural reality, and Georg Büchner (1813–1837), the author of Woyzeck (an almost surreal play about a recruit driven nuts by superiors who finally ends up murdering the young woman he loves) – but also the author of the ‘Hessische Landbote (The Hessian Courier),’ a revolutionary pamphlet addressed to the poor of the countryside that was circulated anonymously in the Hessian region. Her work consists of several photo-collages & montages that are placed above the left entrance of the auditorium. Prof. Schuller writes that the images constituting this work (a work of related yet separate parts!) “do not visualize the invisible; they do not replace something that is missing in the texts / the writing” of playwrights. “I rather see in these works as such something that is invisible. It comes to light as a kind of grieving, which these images represent, and which becomes acute while we look at them.”

Dietrich E. Sattler, a poet, critic and editor of the ‘historisch-kritische Hoelderlin-Ausgabe,’ a new, thorough edition of the collected works of Friedrich Hölderlin (1770–1843), wrote about one of her works, “The moment represented” in the work “never was nor will it ever be. The same is true of the (represented) space; it exists and does not exist. … This is the camera obscura by way of which the dream nests in the day. The strange space where this happens is the interstice (Zwischenraum). The time in which this happens is the ‘time in-between’ (Zwischenzeit). In this case, the camera obscura is nothing but the technical apparatus necessary for the simulation of the dream. It is the artificial enclave of night within day... We admire the intelligence of the artist who spurned the possibility to satisfy our expectations with deceptive surrogates of real light and who presented to us the conditions inside the peepshow box, as if she could destroy the illusion and dissolve the magic of the representational image which alienates us from living images...”

== Selected publications ==
=== Exhibition catalogues and similar publications ===
- Doris Schöttler-Boll (editor; author), Photoalbum, Porträtphotographie, Polizeiphotographie (Photo Album, Portraits, Mug Shots). Bremen (Bremen University, Publications of the Social Science Dept.; University Library) 1980 (= Vol. 1 of: Einsatzfelder der Photographie: Materialien zur Ausstellung / Fields of Utilization of the Medium (Photography). A documentation for the exhibition. Compiled by Doris Schöttler-Boll. - 66pp.)
- Doris Schöttler-Boll. (ed.), Frauen und Kunst: Dekonstruktion von Frauen/Bildern durch Collage + Montage (Women and Art: Deconstructing Images of Women by way of Collage and Montage). Bremen (Weserburg Museum Bremen) 1982, 47 pp.
- Klaus Honneff (curator, editor), Doris Schöttler-Boll: Dekonstruktionen, oder, Vom Widersprechen in Bildern (Doris Schöttler-Boll: De-constructions, or: Talking Back by Way of Images). Cologne (Rheinland Verlag) 1987 - 61 pages
- "L'Art Allemand aujourd'hui" (exhibition catalogue of the group exhibition L'Art Allemand aujourd'hui / German Art Today, European Community Building, Brussels (European Community) 1988
- "Durchqueren - für Büchner und Kleist": Bildensemble für das Grillo-Theater (Traversing. ForBuechner and Kleist: ‘Assemblage’ for the Grillo-Theater). Essen 1995
- "A Deconstructivist Photo-Collage + Montage by Doris Schöttler-Boll: 'Durchqueren' - fuer Buechner und Kleist ('Traversing' - for Buechner and Kleist)", in: Art and Society, issue 7
- Werner Ruhnau (ed.), Doris Schöttler-Boll: Gestaltung des südlichen Foyer-Umganges Grillo-Theater Essen. Essen (Niessen Printing Co.) 1995

=== Books featuring her work ===
- Claudia Gehrke (ed.), Mein heimliches Auge: das Jahrbuch der Erotik, Tuebingen (Konkursbuchverlag) 1982
- Gottfried Jaeger, Bildgebende Fotografie: Fotografik, Lichtgrafik, Lichtmalerei: Urspruenge, Konzepte und Spezifika einer Kunstform, Cologne (DuMont Publishers) 1988
- Helga Mohaupt, Das Grillo-Theater, Geschichte eines Theaterbaus, 1892 – 1990. Mit einer Dokumentation "35 Jahre Variationen zum Thema Offene Spielräume," von Werner Ruhnau. Und Fotos von Rudolf Majer-Finkes. Bonn (Bouvier Verlag) 1990

=== Journals featuring her work ===
- Fotografie (Goettingen), issues 30/31, 1982
- Kunstforum (Cologne), May, 1982
- "FrauenMACHT (Women Power)," A special issue of Konkursbuch (Tuebingen), issue 12, 1984
- "Das Sexuelle, die Frauen und die Kunst" (The Sexual, Women and Art),“ A special issue of Konkursbuch (Tuebingen), issue 20, 1988
- "Unter einem Himmel (Beneath one and the same sky)," in: Kunstforum (Cologne), Dec. 1988. - Report about the exhibition ‘Unter einem Himmel’ that was curated by D.Schöttler-Boll.
- Die Horen, issue 132, 1983

=== Other book publications ===
- Birgit Schulte, Doris Schöttler-Boll, Meike Sundermann (authors), Marianne Pitzen, Ulrike Mond (editors), Tina Behrendt (illustrator): Ruhm: Werke von Künstlerinnen in Nordrhein-Westfälischen Museen: Anlässlich des 50. Geburtstages des Landes Nordrhein-Westfalen Bonn (Frauen-Museum) 1997

=== Television broadcasts focusing on the artist and her work ===
- "Visiting the Studio of Doris Schöttler-Boll (Atelierbesuch bei Doris Schöttler-Boll)", Bremen public television (Radio Bremen), Nov.2, 1982
- "Three Women Artists in the Ruhr District (Drei Kuenstlerinnen im Ruhrgebiet)“ WDR III (TV), Jan. 2, 1989, 21:45h
