= Rahel Jaeggi =

German philosopher (born 1966)

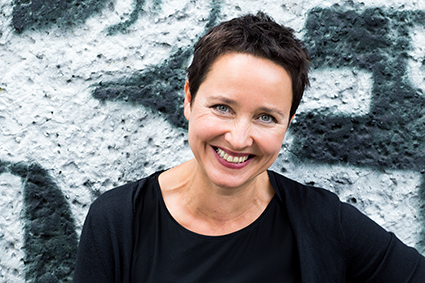
- Jaeggi in 2015
- Born: July 19, 1966 (age 60); Bern, Switzerland
- Occupations: Philosopher, Chair of Practical and Social Philosophy at Humboldt University of Berlin
- Relatives: Urs Jaeggi

Education
- Education: University of Frankfurt; Free University of Berlin
- Doctoral advisor: Axel Honneth

Philosophical work
- Era: Contemporary philosophy
- Region: Western philosophy
- School: Continental philosophy Frankfurt school Neopragmatism
- Institutions: Humboldt University of Berlin
- Main interests: Critical theory
- Notable ideas: Critique of forms of life

Rahel Jaeggi (German: [ˈjɛɡi]; born July 19, 1966) is a Swiss professor of practical philosophy and social philosophy at the Humboldt University of Berlin. Her research areas are in social philosophy, political philosophy, ethics, philosophical anthropology, social ontology, and critical theory. Since February 2018 she has been the head of the Berlin campus of the newly founded International Center for Humanities and Social Change. In 2025 it was announced that she will join the philosophy department at The New School for Social Research starting in fall 2026.

== Biography ==
Rahel Jaeggi is the daughter of Austrian psychoanalyst and author Eva Jaeggi and Swiss sociologist Urs Jaeggi. Prior to working as a research assistant to Axel Honneth (1996-2001) at the Philosophical Institute of the University of Frankfurt (Chair of Social Philosophy) and at the Institute for Social Research, Jaeggi studied at the Free University of Berlin (1990–1996). She completed her studies with a thesis (Magistra Artium) on the political philosophy of Hannah Arendt. In 1999 she was a visiting scholar at the New School for Social Research, New York. She wrote her doctoral thesis on the concept of alienation (Freiheit und Indifferenz – Versuch einer Rekonstruktion des Entfremdungsbegriffs, 2002). Research and teaching positions brought her to Yale University in New Haven, the New School for Social Research in New York City, and the University of Frankfurt.

She wrote her habilitation thesis on the theme Critique of Forms of Life at the University of Frankfurt.

Since 2009 she has been the chair of practical philosophy and social philosophy at the Humboldt University of Berlin.

During the academic year of 2015–2016, Jaeggi was Theodor Heuss Visiting Professor in Philosophy at The New School for Social Research in New York. In 2017 and 2018 she co-organized (with The New School's Alice Crary) the Kritische Theorie in Berlin Summer School (Progress, Regression, and Social Change) in Berlin, Germany.

Together with Daniel Loick, Jaeggi was the main organizer of the international conference "Re-thinking Marx", which took place from 20 to 22 May 2011 at the Humboldt-University of Berlin. During the conference 50 well-known scholars, including the philosopher Étienne Balibar, the sociologist Saskia Sassen, the political scientist Wendy Brown and the social philosopher Axel Honneth discussed topics such as freedom, justice, exploitation and alienation.

Jaeggi receives funding from the Humanities & Social Change International Foundation (established by the businessman and politician of SPD Erck Rickmers) to conduct a research project on the Crisis of Capitalism and Democracy.

In May 2018, together with Sabine Hark, Kristina Lepold and Thomas Seibert, she hosted the international conference Emancipation, which took place at Technische Universität Berlin.

In 2023, Jaeggi was elected Corresponding Fellow of the British Academy.

== Concept of Form of Life ==
One of the central concepts in Jaeggi’s theory is the notion of a form of life. According to the philosopher, forms of life are social formations constituted by sets of practices, which include economic, social, and cultural practices. Jaeggi therefore understands economic practices as social ones. The economy is not an autonomous or independent field. Therefore, it should be understood as part of the sociocultural structure of society, connected to other practices.

From this conception of the economy as a set of social practices, capitalism can be understood not only as a form of life composed of established patterns of practices and habits, but also of rationalities and subjectivities that naturalize the market. In this sense, Jaeggi’s definition goes beyond the idea of capitalism as merely a set of economic social practices, understanding it also as a structuring force of identities and expectations.

== Selected works in English ==
=== Books ===
- Alienation. New York: Columbia University Press, 2014.
- Capitalism: A Conversation in Critical Theory (with Nancy Fraser). Cambridge, UK: Polity Press, 2018.
- Critique of Forms of Life. Cambridge, MA: Harvard University Press, 2018.
- Progress and Regression. Cambridge, MA: Harvard University Press, 2025.

=== Essays ===
- "What (if Anything) Is Wrong with Capitalism". Working Paper 01/2013 of the DFG–Forschungskolleg Postwachstumsgesellschaften, Friedrich-Schiller University, Jena, 2013. (Also in: The Southern Journal of Philosophy, Volume 54, Spindel Supplement, 2016.)
- "What is a (good) Institution?" in: Social Philosophy and Critique, Rainer Forst, Martin Hartmann, Rahel Jaeggi and Martin Saar (ed.), 2009.
- "Re-Thinking Ideology" in: New Waves in Political Philosophy, Christopher Zurn, Boujdewijn de Bruijn (ed.), 2008.
- "No Individual Can Do Anything Against It: Adorno's Minima Moralia as a Critique of Forms of Life" in: Dialectic of Freedom, Axel Honneth (ed.), Suhrkamp, 2005.
- "Solidarity and Indifference" in: Solidarity and Care in the European Union, R. Termeulen and R. Houtepen (ed.), Kluwer, 2001.
- "The Market's Price" in: Constellations, volume 8, nº 3, 2001.
