= Interpassivity =

Social concept

Interpassivity is a concept in social anthropology and psychoanalysis referring to instances where some entity consumes, believes, or enjoys in the place of the original consumer or audience. Interpassivity is not simply the opposite of interactivity since passivity is here conceived metaphorically as encompassing passion, intense experience, deeply held belief or personal affective identification, rather than mere lack of action. Interpassive outsourcing is explained by the psychic transfer of a demanding or a (potentially) traumatic experience into a less demanding and more comforting one. Hence, interpassive subjects often prefer to delegate, if only unconsciously, through minor acts of disengagement or keeping distance, their enjoyment or consumption to others for a less intense kind of enjoyment or pleasure experienced through this entity, be it purely symbolic, cultural or technological artefact. The meaning of the term was interpreted mainly (in German) by Robert Pfaller in 1996, and was later taken up by Slavoj Žižek.

== Origin of the term ==
The term of interpassivity first appears in cultural theorists’ Simon Penny’s and Mona Sarkis’ texts. Pfaller picked up the term at a 1996 symposium in Linz, entitled Die Dinge lachen an unserer Stelle (trans: Things Laugh in our Place); in the same year he published an article entitled "Um die Ecke gelacht" (trans: Laughed Around the Corner) in Falter. These titles refer to one of Pfaller's core examples of interpassivity, canned laughter: the laugh track laughs in the audience's place.

Although Pfaller reinterpreted the term, he is openly indebted to a longer conceptual history. In his 1959-60 Seminar on The Ethics of Psychoanalysis, French psychoanalyst Jacques Lacan argued that, in Greek Tragedy, the Chorus feels (emotionally) in the audience's place; following this insight, in his 1989 book The Sublime Object of Ideology, Žižek argued that canned laughter is the exact modern counterpart to the Chorus. At this point, Žižek refers to the phenomenon as the "objective status of belief", in which the external object believes/feels/laughs on behalf of the subject, leaving the subject internally free from responsibility.

== Meaning and examples ==
The book Interpassivity: The Aesthetics of Delegated Enjoyment by Robert Pfaller is the most authoritative source on the topic. Robert Pfaller has developed this theory since 1996, accounting for diverse cultural phenomena where delegation of consumption and enjoyment stands central, answering questions such as "Why do people record TV programmes instead of watching them?" "Why are some recovering alcoholics pleased to let other people drink in their place?" and "Why can ritual machines pray in place of believers?"

An example of interpassivity, given by Žižek, in his book How To Read Lacan, uses the VCR to illustrate the concept. The VCR records a movie (presumably to be watched later). However, Žižek argues that since the VCR can record, people who own them watch fewer movies because they can record them and have them on hand. The VCR does the watching of the movie so the owner of the VCR can be free not to watch the movie. Žižek uses the VCR to demonstrate the big other's role in interpassivity. The VCR, like canned laughter in a show, functions as a tool interacting with itself so the viewer need not watch the show.

Pfaller, a professor of philosophy at the University of Art and Design Linz, elaborated the theory of interpassivity within the fields of cultural studies and psychoanalysis.. He has also received an award for the best 2014 book in psychoanalysis by the American Psychoanalytic Association, for his book On the Pleasure Principle in Culture: Illusions without Owners, which also includes a discussion of the concept of interpassivity. Pfaller reasons that because interpassive behaviour typically proceeds unconsciously, the rationale of outsourcing one's enjoyment might feel counterintuitive to interpassive subjects themselves and takes the form of an illusion they do not identify with, yet continue enacting in their overt ritualised behaviour. Juha Suoranta and Tere Vadén, working on the basis of Pfaller's and Zizek's insights, stress interpassivity's potential of changing "into its negative when illusory interactivity produces passivity".

In his book Capitalist Realism, the British philosopher Mark Fisher explores the widespread effects of neoliberal ideology on popular culture, specifically how "time after time, the villain in Hollywood films will turn out to be the 'evil corporation'. Far from undermining capitalist realism, this gestural anti-capitalism actually reinforces it". In the book, he goes on to use Disney/Pixar's 2008 film WALL-E, where Earth is a garbage-strewn wasteland due to ecocide, caused by rampant consumerism, corporate greed, and environmental neglect, as his prime example. Fisher argues: "A film like Wall-E exemplifies what Robert Pfaller has called 'interpassivity': the film performs our anti-capitalism for us, allowing us to continue to consume with impunity."
