= Philippe Corcuff =

- Born: April 15, 1960 (age 66); Oran, Algeria
- Education: Institut de Journalisme Bordeaux Aquitaine; School for Advanced Studies in the Social Sciences
- Occupations: Political commentator, sociologist
- Employer(s): Lyon Institute of Political Studies; Charlie Hebdo
- Political party: Socialist Party; Revolutionary Communist League; New Anticapitalist Party; The Greens; Citizen's Movement; Anarchist Federation

Philippe Corcuff (born 15 April 1960) is a French academic, full professor in political science at the Institut d'études politiques de Lyon since October 1992 and member of the CERLIS laboratory (Centre de Recherche sur les Liens Sociaux, Université de Paris / Université Sorbonne Nouvelle / CNRS) since October 2003. Politically committed to the left, with a trajectory that took him from social democracy to pragmatic anarchism, via the ecologists and the New Anti-Capitalist Party, he defines himself as an “anti-globalization and libertarian activist”. He was a columnist for the French satirical weekly Charlie Hebdo from 2001 to 2004.

Sociologically speaking, he had started in study with a socio-ethnographic approach, within the scope of his thesis, the building of social groups, through railroaders’ trade unionism and, wider, the workers' movement. He offers then a reading of Pierre Bourdieu’s critical sociology, emphasizing the “post-marxist” aspect of his social criticism, while pointing out several contradictions. He did so especially in the book Bourdieu autrement (2003, non-translated, in English: “Bourdieu, differently”). In this perspective, he linked the critical sociology of Pierre Bourdieu, the pragmatic sociology of Luc Boltanski and the philosophy of emancipation of Jacques Rancière to build a new critical theory, particularly in his book Où est passée la critique sociale? (2012, non-translated, in English : "Where is the social criticism?"). The re-evaluation of the place of individuality has been one of the axes of this new critical thinking. To explore this new critical theory, he also analyzed products of popular culture (detective novels, films, TV series, songs...), using the notion of language games taken from the philosopher Ludwig Wittgenstein and drawing on Stanley Cavell's philosophy of cinema. From the 2010s onwards, he has been interested in a critical political theory of the extreme right-wingisation of public spaces in France and how the confusion of ideas on the left contributes to it, with his book La grande confusion. Comment l'extrême droite gagne la bataille des idées (2021, non-translated, in English: "The great confusion. How the far right is winning the battle of ideas").

== Selected works ==
- 1995: Les Nouvelles Sociologies, Paris, Nathan (coll. "128"), 128 p. (ISBN 2-09-190748-0); 3e ed. en 2011 : Paris, Armand Colin, coll. « 128 », 128 p. (ISBN 978-2-200-25985-3)
- 2002: La Société de verre. Pour une éthique de la fragilité, Paris, Armand Colin, coll. "Individu et société", 269 p. (ISBN 2-200-26436-4)
- 2003: Bourdieu autrement. Fragilités d’un sociologue de combat, Paris, Textuel, coll. "La Discorde", 143 p. (ISBN 2-84597-074-9).
- 2012: Où est passée la critique sociale ? Penser le global au croisement des savoirs, Paris, La Découverte, coll. "Bibliothèque du MAUSS", 320 p. (ISBN 978-2-7071-7328-7)
- 2014: Domination et émancipation. Pour un renouveau de la critique sociale, presentation of the debate between Luc Boltanski and Nancy Fraser, Lyon, Presses universitaires de Lyon, coll. "Grands débats : Mode d'emploi", 76 p. (ISBN 978-2-7297-0886-3)
- 2016: "Repères libertaires et pragmatiques pour des coalitions altermondialistes"/"Anarchist and pragmatist Markers for anti-globalization Coalitions", in Delphine Gardey, Cynthia Kraus (eds.), Politiques de coalition. Penser et se mobiliser avec Judith Butler/Politics of Coalition. Thinking Collective Action with Judith Butler, bilingual French/English edition, Zurich, Editions Seismo, coll. "Questions de genre/Gender Issues" (ISBN 978-2-88351-069-2)
- 2009: "Pierre Bourdieu (1930-2002) leído de otra manera. Crítica social post-marxista y el problema de la singularidad individual", Cultura y Representaciones Sociales (Revista electrónica de ciencias sociales, Universidad Nacional Autónoma de México), vol. 4, número 7, pp. 9–26
- 2020: "De ciertas desventuras de la razón decolonial y poscolonial: homenaje crítico y libertario al cuestionamiento descolonizador", in Gaya Makaran and Pierre Gaussens (eds.), Piel blanca, máscaras negras. Critica de la razón decolonial, México, Bajo Tierra Ediciones y Centro de Investigaciones sobre América Latina y el Caribe-Universidad Nacional Autónoma de México (ISBN 978-607-98901-6-2)
- 2020: Individualidades, común y utopía. Crítica libertaria del populismo de izquierda, preface from José Luis Moreno Pestaña, Madrid, Dado Ediciones, coll. "Disonancias", 210 p. (ISBN 978-84-948922-9-5)
- 2021: "Individuality and the contradictions of neocapitalism", in Vesna Stanković Pejnović (ed.), Beyond Neoliberalism and Capitalism, Belgrade, Institute for Political Studies, coll. "International Thematic Collection of Papers", pp. 57–73
- 2021: La grande confusion. Comment l'extrême-droite gagne la bataille des idées, éditions Textuel, coll. "Petite Encyclopédie critique", 672 p. (ISBN 978-2-84597-854-6)
- 2021: "Domination and Emancipation in the Current Conjuncture" (with Gabriel Rockhill, cross interview by Daniel Benson) and "Renewing Critical Theory in an Ultra-Conservative Context: between the Social Sciences, Political Philosophy, and Emancipatory Engagement", in Daniel Benson (ed.), Domination and Emancipation. Remaking Critique, Lanham (MD), Rowman & Littlefield International, Series "Reinventing Critical Theory" (ISBN 978-1-78660-699-0)
- October 2021: "Progressism and the Challenge of Conservatism", Pouvoirs [Cairn International], n° 179
- January 2022: "Television Series as Critical Theories: From Current Identarianism to Levinas. American Crime, The Sinner, Sharp Objects, Unorthodox", Open Philosophy (Open Access Journal, De Gruyter, Berlin), vol. 5, no. 1, pp. 105–117, online since 16 December 2021
- 2022: "Sociology, Social Justice and Emancipation. Towards an Epistemological Compass, Between Fog, Dispersion and Reproblematisation", Postface to Emmanuelle Barozet, Ivan Sainsaulieu, Régis Cortesoro, David Mélo (eds.), Where Has Social Justice Gone? From Equality to Experimentation, London, Palgrave Macmillan (ISBN 978-3-030-93122-3)
- 2021: "Marx/Bourdieu: Convergences and Tensions, Between Critical Sociology and Philosophy of Emancipation", in Gabriella Paolucci (ed.), Bourdieu and Marx. Practices of Critique, London, Palgrave Macmillan (ISBN 978-3-031-06288-9)
