= Women Making History in Portland =

Mural in Portland, Oregon, U.S.

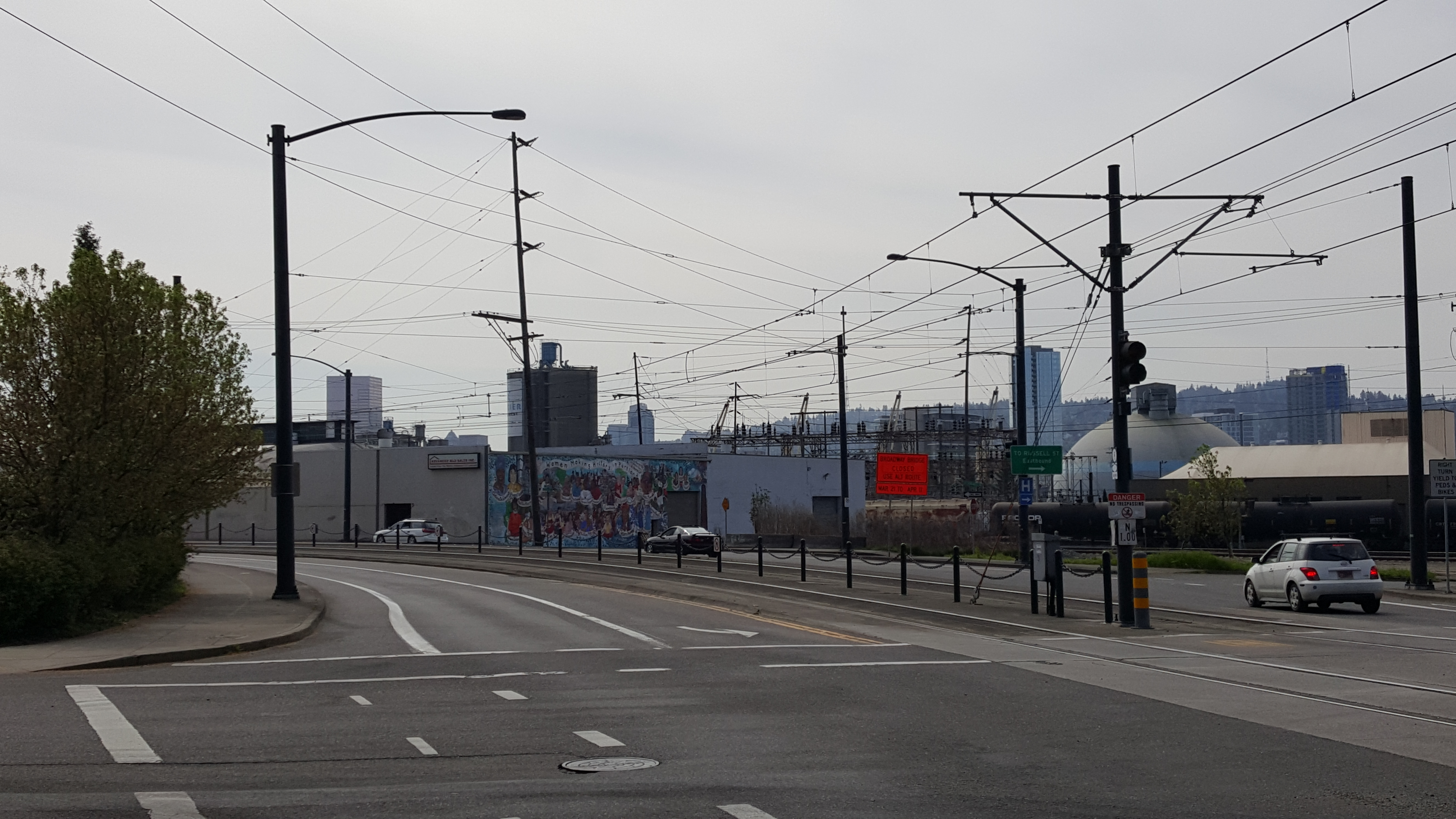
- The mural seen from the intersection of N. Interstate and N. Russell, 2016
- Artist: Robin Corbo
- Year: 2007
- Type: Mural
- Medium: Acrylic paint
- Dimensions: 5.5 m × 18 m (18 ft × 60 ft)
- Location: Portland, Oregon, United States; 45.54015°N 122.67723°W
- Owner: City of Portland and Multnomah County Public Art Collection courtesy of the Regional Arts & Culture Council

Women Making History in Portland, sometimes abbreviated as Women Making History, is a 2007 mural by Robin Corbo, located in north Portland, Oregon, in the United States.

== Description and history ==
Robin Corbo's Women Making History in Portland (2007) is located at 2335 North Clark Avenue, near the intersection of North Larrabee Avenue and North Harding Avenue, in Portland's Eliot neighborhood. The 18-foot (5.5 m) x 60-foot (18 m), or 1,080-square-foot (100 m^{2}), acrylic painting depicts and honors women who have influenced the city, surround by a border with black birds. It has been called an "ode to feminism".

In Other Words Women's Books and Resources organized the mural, which was "made to promote the mission of empowering women through art and education". It was funded by the Public Art Murals Program and private donors, and is part of the City of Portland and Multnomah County Public Art Collection courtesy of the Regional Arts & Culture Council.

In March 2008, the Janovec Gallery in the Brooklyn neighborhood displayed reproductions of the mural in their month-long exhibition about Portland's "artistic 'remarkable women'". Some of the artists who worked on the mural attended the exhibition's reception.

The mural was vandalized in 2017.

== See also ==
- 2007 in art
- Culture of Portland, Oregon
