= In Other Words Feminist Community Center =

Coordinates: 45.5626°N 122.6667°W

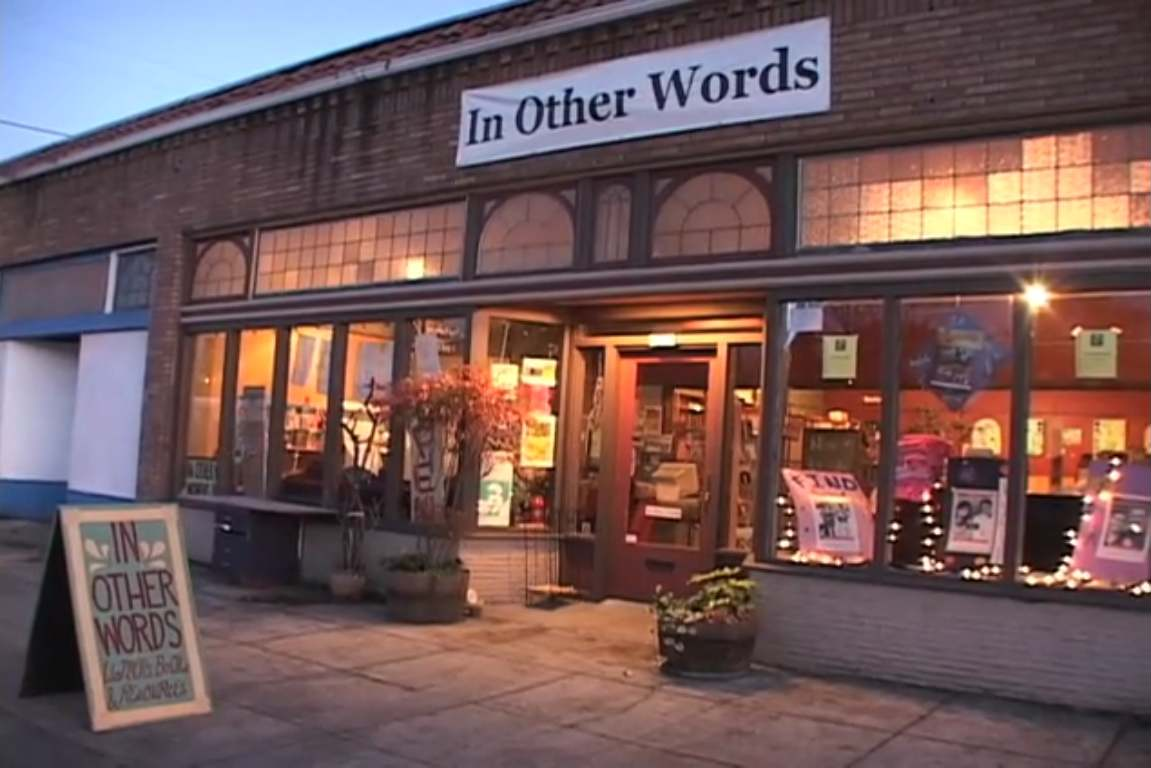
- Type: Non-profit 501(c)(3)
- Industry: Community center
- Founded: 1993
- Defunct: 2018
- Headquarters: Portland, Oregon
- Key people: Johanna Brenner; Kathryn Tetrick; Catherine Sameh (founders)
- Products: Books, magazines, CDs, locally made products
- Website: inotherwords.org *Defunct*

In Other Words Feminist Community Center was an independent non-profit feminist bookstore, community center and events space in Portland, Oregon. Its mission statement read: "In Other Words inspires and cultivates feminist community, nurturing social justice." Founded in 1993, it closed in 2018.

== Early years ==
The center was founded as In Other Words Women's Books and Resources in 1993 by Johanna Brenner, the Women's Studies program coordinator at Portland State University at that time, along with Kathryn Tetrick, and Catherine Sameh. The trio opened the store in response to the closure of Portland's only other feminist bookstore, A Woman's Space. The original storefront was located in the heart of the Hawthorne District, and advertised itself as a "gathering place for all women and their friends, a community space where anyone can discover the rich world of women's literature, culture and community."

According to the Wall Street Journal, the bookstore was financially supported by an exclusive contract to sell textbooks for PSU’s women’s studies courses. In 2010, following the passage of legislation which required schools to disclose textbook information during class registration, PSU terminated the contract. Within a year, the store was more than $18,000 in debt.

== NE Killingsworth ==
In February 2006 the store relocated to Northeast Portland near Alberta Street. Unable to afford the rising rent on Hawthorne, the organization worked out an agreement to use a space on NE Killingsworth Street owned by the Albina Women's League. The location had previously been home to the Albina Art Center, an organization aimed at "discovering and developing the intellectual and cultural resources of the area," and had historically been a black neighborhood. This move raised many concerns about gentrification and white feminism.

== Current operation ==
As of 2011, In Other Words was one of nine feminist bookstores left in the United States. Due to declining revenues, the organization shifted its focus from book-selling to fostering grassroots activism as a feminist community center. The center hosted weekly, monthly, quarterly, and one-time events featuring art, literature, feminist philosophy, and queer activism, among other topics. It also retains a retail component, selling books on topics such as feminism, queer studies, and transgender studies, along with consignment goods from local artists. In 2011, In Other Words also launched a lending library with a wide variety of titles available to the public at no charge.

As part of its restructuring, In Other Words became nearly completely volunteer run, except for one paid accountant. The organization was made up of a board of directors and a system of volunteer work teams.

In Other Words was part of the inspiration for the fictional feminist bookstore in the sketch comedy show Portlandia as well as a setting for some of the show's scenes. However, the store's owners later became critical of the show's portrayal of issues they considered to be important, and in 2016 they cut ties with the show and expressed their criticism publicly, describing it as "diametrically opposed to our politics and the vision of society we're organizing to realize".

In fall 2014, it was announced that the store would soon be forced to close because of a shortage of funds. A fundraising campaign kept the store open for a time, but it closed permanently in June 2018, blaming the "white supremacy" and its founders. Critical Resistance Portland planned to keep the building open as a community center.

== See also ==
- List of companies based in Oregon
- Women Making History in Portland (2007), a mural organized by In Other Words
