= Recognition justice =

Social philosophy theory

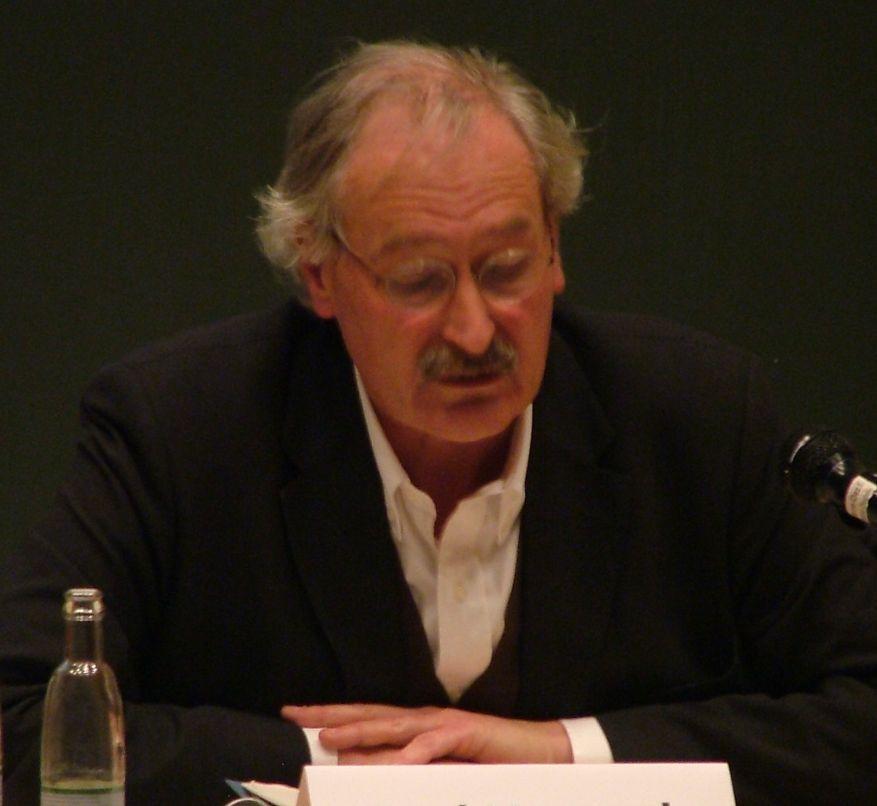
Axel Honneth

Recognition justice is a theory of social justice that emphasizes the recognition of human dignity and of difference between subaltern groups and the dominant society. Social philosophers Axel Honneth and Nancy Fraser point to a 21st-century shift in theories of justice away from distributive justice (which emphasises the elimination of economic inequalities) toward recognition justice and the eliminating of humiliation and disrespect. The shift is associated with the rise of identity politics.

The political implications of recognition justice are more ambiguous than distributive justice, because recognition is not a resource then can be redistributed, but is rather a phenomenological experience of people and groups. Honneth takes up the Hegelian idea that subjectivity is only fully constituted through intersubjective relationships, structured in different spheres of recognition—love, rights, and solidarity.

== Background and debate ==
Nancy Fraser critiques over-reliance on recognition justice, arguing for a combination of distributive and recognition justice to guarantee equal participation in society. Fraser states that since 1989, the political left has entered a post-socialist period marked by the absence of any credible vision for a just society. In this absence, claims by subaltern groups for recognition of difference have become "intensely salient… at times eclipsing claims for social equality." She further observes that 21st century social movements are increasingly defined as cultural groups rather than as economic classes (as was the case prior to the 1990s when a socialist/Marxist analysis dominated leftist ideology). Fraser aims to integrate claims for recognition with claims for redistribution in the context of rising neoliberalism that has resulted in further concentration of wealth and distributive injustice.

David Ingram in his book World Crisis and Underdevelopment claims that injustice always implies lack of recognition. He promotes recognition justice, stating that "recognition theory takes up everyday feelings of moral outrage, encourages theoretical elaboration of new concepts by which to name and identify the harms that occasion that outrage, and thereby provides theoretical guidance to the formation of social movements aimed at overcoming a vast array of distinctive types of social injustices."

Schweiger critiques Ingram's claims that injustice implies lack of recognition, stating that certain forms of epistemic injustice have "precisely the form of separating injustices and experiences of misrecognition." He asserts that phenomenologically, most people do not understand the injustices they face and may unquestioningly accept their own exploitation.

== Environmental justice ==
Environmental justice scholar Kyle Powys Whyte promotes recognition justice as a framework for evaluating the fairness of interactions between American Indigenous people and the US federal government. He elaborates that distributive, procedural, and corrective justice frameworks can't be applied to tribal contexts without recognising native peoples' unique experiences with colonisation and political statuses. Tribal environmental struggles can't be reduced to class conflicts, and Indigenous peoples' economic aspirations may not be commensurable with the economic values of the dominant society.

Colville scholar Dina Gilio-Whitaker also states that environmental justice frameworks should recognise Indigenous peoples' special legal relationship with the federal government and spiritual interdependence with the Earth.

== See also ==
- Lord–bondsman dialectic
- Multiculturalism
- Political representation
