= Hugo Jaeggi =

Swiss photographer (1936–2018)

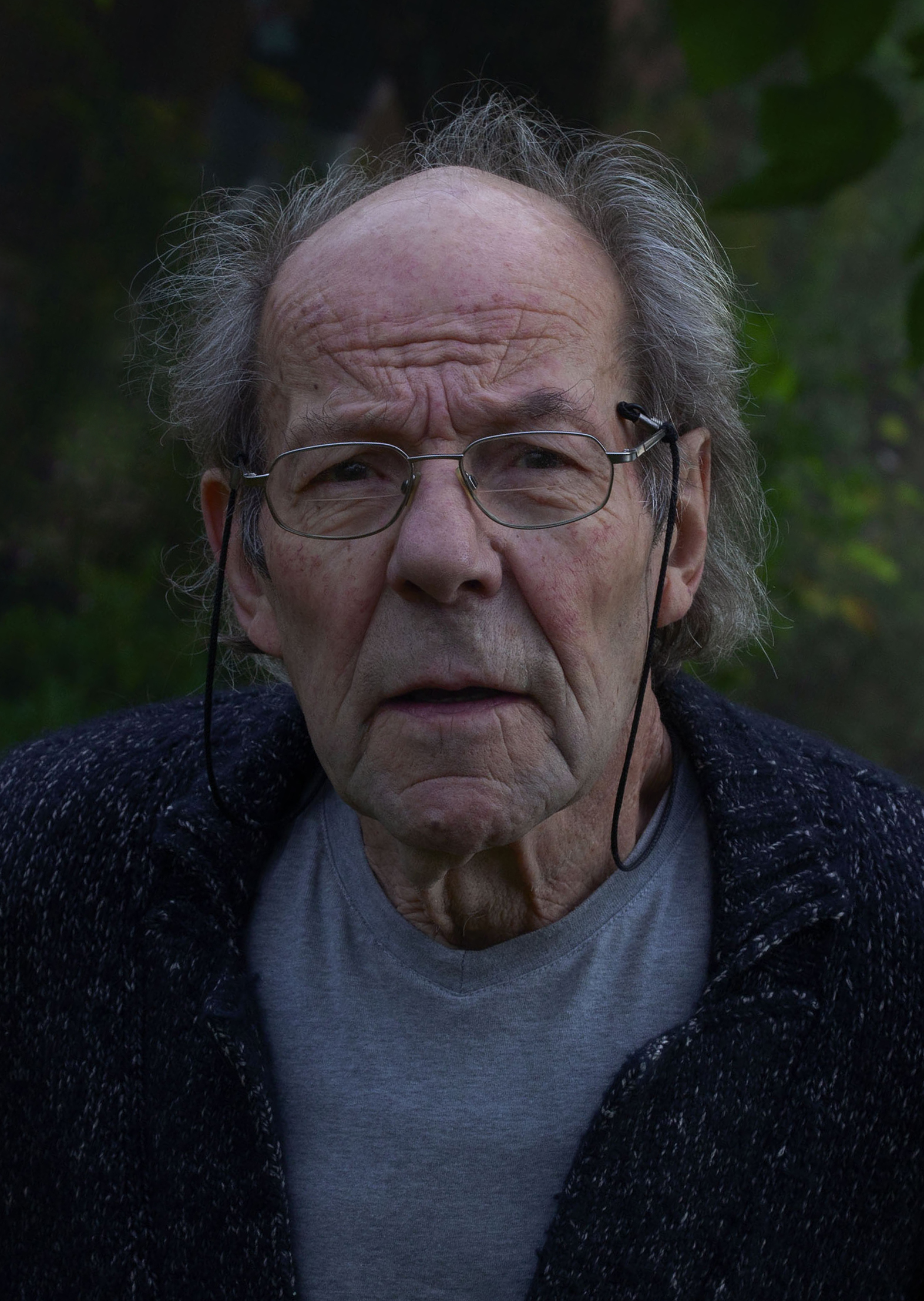
- Jaeggi in 2017
- Born: Hugo Josef Jaeggi; 15 May 1936; Solothurn, Switzerland
- Died: 23 August 2018 (aged 82); Burg im Leimental, Switzerland
- Occupation: Photographer

Hugo Josef Jaeggi (15 May 1936 – 23 August 2018) was a Swiss photographer.

== Biography ==
Hugo Jaeggi completed his professional apprenticeship as a photographer with Ernst Räss from 1953 to 1956 in Solothurn after completing high school in 1953. In the period from 1958 to 1959 he worked as a cameraman for Swiss television. Hugo Jaeggi passed the master's examination in 1960. From that point on he ran his own photography business in Basel as a freelance photographer until 1974. From 1983 he lived and worked in Burg im Leimental (Canton of Basel-Landschaft). Jaeggi was constantly dedicated to his own photo projects with high artistic standards, especially in the area of portraits. Trips together led him – often with friend journalist Peter Jaeggi – to Guatemala, India, Belarus and African countries. He always used these orders to create his own, very personal and mostly black and white pictures in addition to the colored "mandatory part" for the media. While the reportage photos appeared in many different print media, including the Basler Zeitung magazine, the artist continuously completed his personal photographic work.

Jaeggi tried to capture his experiences and dreams in newly composed pictures. The parameters of the design, a composition and narration in several narrative levels remained criteria for him. He used a 35mm Leica camera with a 35 mm lens for over six decades.

"Hugo Jaeggi is also a virtuoso narrator. Above all, the encounter with people inspires him to record life stories and fates, to accompany developments, to observe changes and to think about these changes," wrote Peter Pfrunder, Director of the Fotostiftung Schweiz about Hugo Jaeggi (in: Peter Jaeggi and Peter Pfrunder (ed.), «Hugo Jaeggi. Nahe am Menschen: Fotografien», Benteli, Bern. ISBN 978-3-7165-1432-0). The Fotostiftung Schweiz Winterthur archives over 600 silver gelatin prints by the artist (as of 2017).

Hugo Jaeggi's visual themes include: portrait, landscape, still life, everyday life, industry (Von Roll), work, several long-term projects, humanitarian issues and the like. a. in Switzerland and Europe: Belarus, Czech Republic, Africa: Tanzania, Asia: India, South America: Guatemala and others.

He taught at a Rudolf Steiner school until 2016. From 2006 Hugo Jaeggi used the digital camera to make changes in the immediate vicinity when he discovered the extraordinary nature of natural decay processes in the immediate vicinity of his house.

Jaeggi died of cancer in 2018 at the age of 82.

In 2019, the film Zudem ist der Traum oft Realität genug on the life and work of Hugo Jaeggi, directed by Matthias Leupold and Jérôme Depierre, was released on Schweizer Fernsehen.

== Publications (selection) ==
- «Grün 80», Friedrich Reinhardt, Basel, 1980. ISBN 978-3-7245-0453-5
- «Hugo Jaeggi. Fotografien» (Kat., Text Urs Stahel), Kunstmuseum Solothurn, 1986. ISBN 978-3-906663-05-0
- Peter Jaeggi, «Menschen in der Tela – Gesichter und Geschichten aus der Fabrik», Aarcadia-Verlag, Solothurn, 1994. ISBN 978-3-908579-01-4
- Peter Jaeggi (Hg.), «Die Hoffnung stirbt zuletzt – Belarus im Jahre zwölf nach Tschernobyl» (mit Sergej Bruschko), AT Verlag, Aarau, 1998. ISBN 978-3-85502-637-1
- Peter Jaeggi und Peter Pfrunder (Hg.), «Hugo Jaeggi. Nahe am Menschen: Fotografien», Benteli, Bern, 2006. ISBN 978-3-7165-1432-0
