= Punished by Rewards =

1993 book by Alfie Kohn

- Author: Alfie Kohn
- Subject: Behaviorism, education
- Published: 1993 (Houghton Mifflin)

Punished by Rewards: The Trouble with Gold Stars, Incentive Plans, A's, Praise, and Other Bribes is a 1993 book by Alfie Kohn that argues against the use of rewards to incentivize behavior.
