= Alfie Kohn =

American author and lecturer (born 1957)

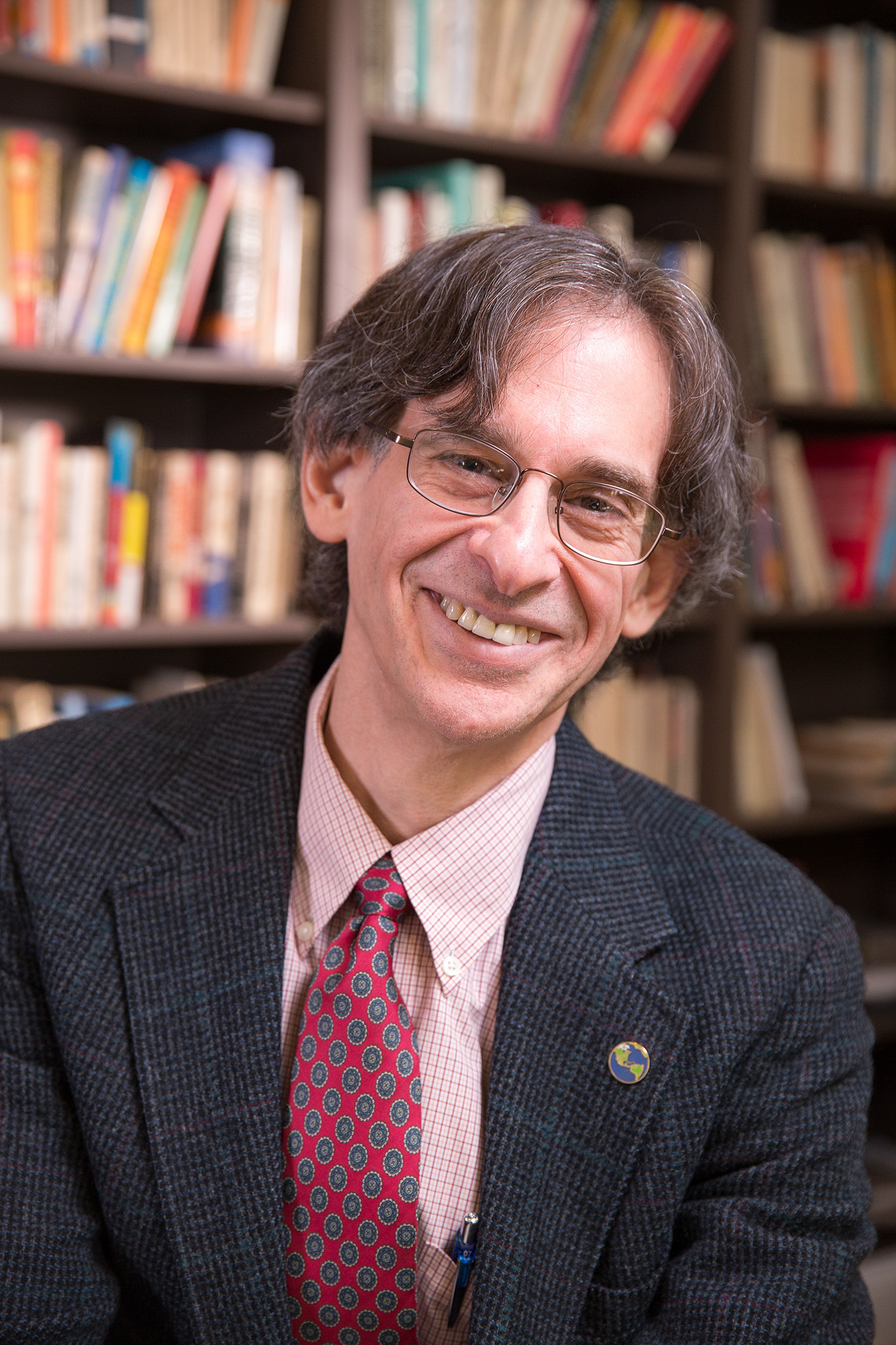
- Born: October 15, 1957 (age 68); Miami Beach, Florida, U.S.
- Education: Brown University (B.A.); University of Chicago (M.A.)
- Occupations: Author and lecturer (education, psychology, and parenting)

Alfie Kohn (born October 15, 1957) is an American author and lecturer in the areas of education, parenting, and human behavior. He is a proponent of progressive education and has offered critiques of many traditional aspects of parenting, managing, and American society more generally, drawing in each case from social science research.

Kohn's challenges to widely accepted theories and practices have made him a controversial figure, particularly with behaviorists, conservatives, and those who defend the practices he calls into question, such as the use of competition, incentive programs, conventional discipline, standardized testing, grades, homework, and traditional schooling.

== Biography ==
Kohn was born in Miami Beach, Florida. He earned a B.A. from Brown University in Providence, Rhode Island, in 1979, having created his interdisciplinary course of study, and an M.A. in the social sciences from the University of Chicago in Illinois in 1980. He lives in the Boston area and works as an independent scholar, writing books about research in the areas of education, parenting, and human behavior.

== Views ==
=== Education ===
Kohn's ideas on education have been influenced by the works of John Dewey and Jean Piaget. He believes in a constructivist account of learning in which the learner is seen as actively making meaning rather than absorbing information, and he argues that knowledge should be taught "in a context and for a purpose." He has written that learning should be organized around "problems, projects, and questions – rather than around lists of facts, skills, and separate disciplines." Along with this belief, Kohn feels that students should have an active voice in the classroom with the ability to have a meaningful impact on the curriculum, the structure of the room, and any necessary disciplinary measures.

Kohn has been critical of several aspects of traditional schooling. Classroom management and discipline are, in his view, focused more on eliciting compliance than on helping students become caring, responsible problem-solvers. He has also denounced the effects of the test-driven "accountability" movement – in general, but particularly on low-income and minority students – arguing that "the more poor children fill in worksheets on command (to raise their test scores), the further they fall behind affluent kids who are more likely to get lessons that help them understand ideas." More recently, Kohn has been critical of the place homework holds in the American classroom, noting that research does not support claims of any benefit from homework, academically or otherwise.

=== Parenting ===
While Unconditional Parenting (2005) is Kohn's first book that deals primarily with raising children, he devoted two chapters to this topic in Punished by Rewards (1993). He discusses the need for parents to remember their long-term goals for their children, such as helping them grow into responsible and caring people, rather than short-term goals, such as obedience. The key question, he argues, is "What do kids need – and how do we meet those needs?"

One of Kohn's most widely circulated articles is "Five Reasons to Stop Saying 'Good Job!'" which argues that praise, like other forms of extrinsic inducements, tends to undermine children's commitment to whatever they were praised for doing (i.e., children are taught to do things to get praise rather than do the things because it is right to do so, or because it is enjoyable to do so). Later, he expanded this critique to suggest that positive reinforcement, like certain forms of punitive "consequences," amounts to forms of conditional parenting, in which love is made contingent on pleasing or obeying the parent.

Another book by Kohn, The Myth of the Spoiled Child (2014), addresses common assumptions about "overindulged" kids, "helicopter" parents, self-esteem, and self-discipline, and it criticizes what he calls "the deeply conservative ideology" behind complaints that children receive trophies, praise, and "A" too easily.

=== Management ===
Two of Kohn's books, No Contest (1986) and Punished by Rewards (1993), address competition and "pop behaviorism" in workplaces as well as in families and schools. Both attracted considerable attention in business circles, particularly when the late W. Edwards Deming, known for inspiring the quality improvement movement in organizations, endorsed both books. Kohn spoke at conferences and individual corporations on management during the 1990s, and his work was debated in the Harvard Business Review, CFO Magazine, the American Compensation Association Journal, and other publications.

== Works ==
Kohn has published 14 books. This includes eight issues in education (e.g., homework, standardized testing, grades, teaching styles), two on parenting, and four on general topics (e.g. human nature, competition, motivation). His books have been translated into two dozen languages.

- No Contest: The Case Against Competition (Houghton Mifflin, 1986/1992)
- You Know What They Say...: The Truth About Popular Beliefs (HarperCollins, 1990)
- The Brighter Side of Human Nature: Altruism and Empathy in Everyday Life (Basic Books, 1990)
- Punished by Rewards: The Trouble with Gold Stars, Incentive Plans, A's, Praise, and Other Bribes (Houghton Mifflin, 1993/1999)
- Beyond Discipline: From Compliance to Community (Association for Supervision and Curriculum Development, 1996/2006)
- What To Look For In A Classroom... And Other Essays (Jossey-Bass, 1998)
- The Schools Our Children Deserve: Moving Beyond Traditional Classrooms and "Tougher Standards" (Houghton Mifflin, 1999)
- The Case Against Standardized Testing: Raising the Scores, Ruining the Schools (Heinemann, 2000)
- What Does It Mean To Be Well Educated? And More Essays on Standards, Grading, and Other Follies (Beacon Press, 2004)
- Unconditional Parenting: Moving from Rewards and Punishments to Love and Reason (Atria Books, 2005)
- The Homework Myth: Why Our Kids Get Too Much of a Bad Thing (Da Capo Books, 2006)
- Feel Bad Education: And Other Contrarian Essays on Children and Schooling (Beacon Press, 2011)
- The Myth of the Spoiled Child: Challenging the Conventional Wisdom about Children and Parenting (Da Capo Books, 2014)
- Schooling Beyond Measure...And Other Unorthodox Essays About Education (Heinemann, 2015)

Edited by Kohn:

- Education, Inc.: Turning Learning into a Business (Heinemann, 2002)

DVDs of Kohn's lectures:

- Unconditional Parenting: Moving from Rewards and Punishments to Love and Reason.
- No Grades + No Homework = Better Learning.

Kohn has written articles for academic journals, magazines and newspapers. Among the publications to which he has contributed are The Atlantic, The New York Times, Harvard Business Review, The Chronicle of Higher Education, and Parents.

== Recognition ==
- Laureate, Kappa Delta Pi (International Education Honor Society)
- National Council of Teachers of English George Orwell Award for Distinguished Contribution to Honesty and Clarity in Public Language, 2000, for The Schools Our Children Deserve
- National-Louis University Ferguson Award for Distinguished Contribution to Early Childhood Education, 2002
- American Psychological Association's National Psychology Award for Excellence in the Media, 1987, for No Contest
- National Parenting Publications Awards (NAPPA) Gold Award, 2006, for Unconditional Parenting
- Canadian Teachers' Federation's Public Education Advocacy Award, 2007
