= Donor recognition wall =

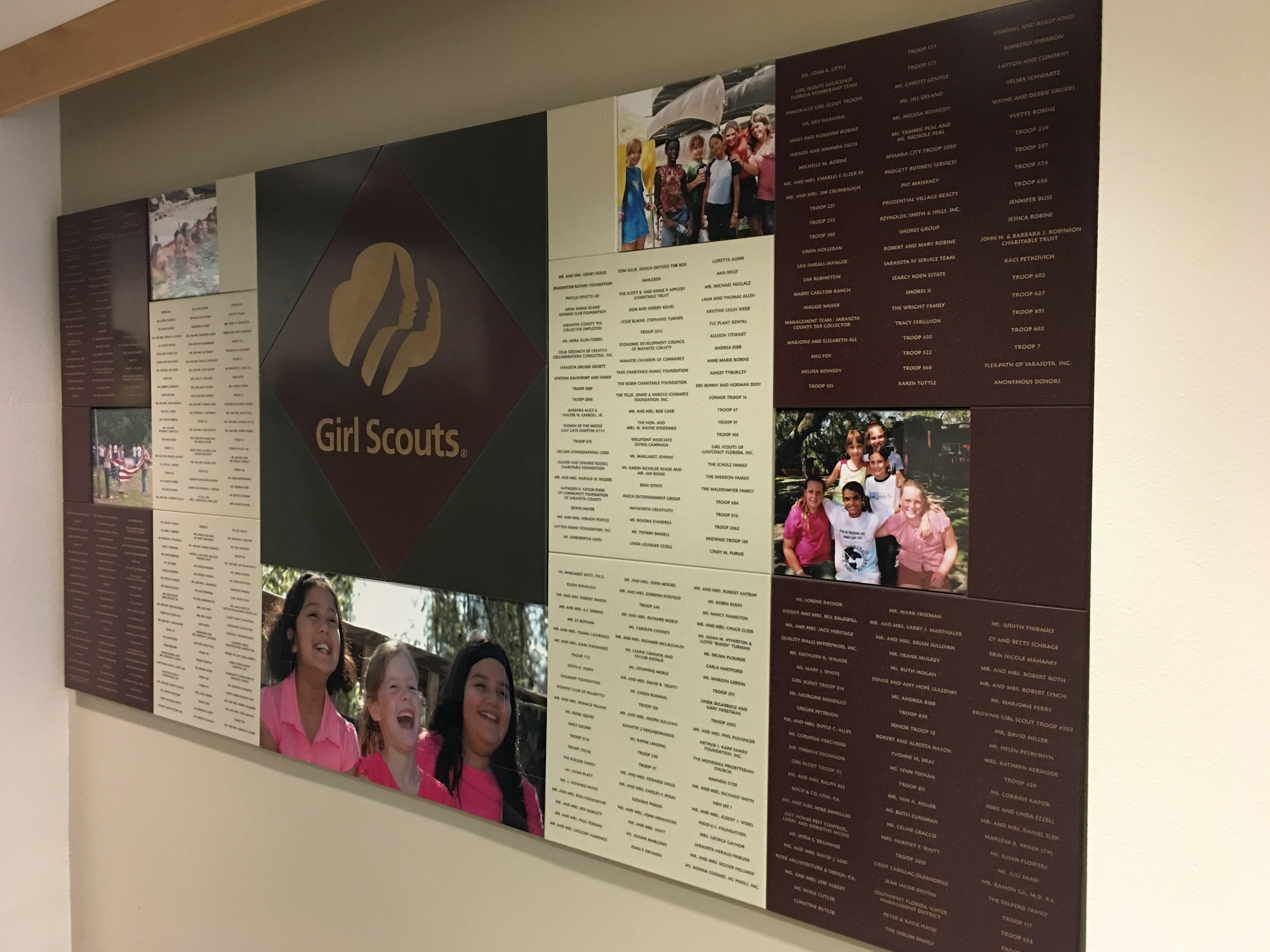
An example of an engraved Corian donor recognition wall for Girl Scouts of the Gulf Coast by RecognitionArt.

With origins in the early 20th century, a donor recognition wall (also known as a donor wall or donor display) is typically a wall-mounted display found in a centralized location of a hospital, university, museum, library, worship facility, or other nonprofit institution. It consists of a listing of names of persons or companies that contributed funds to a capital campaign or other major fundraising effort of the organization. The fundamental purposes of a donor recognition wall are to honor the major financial contributors of an organization, and to serve as an incentive for potential donors to contribute.

Traditionally, donor recognition walls consisted of header (title) lettering with the names of benefactors listed below on engraved brass panels or plaques. Today, however, donor recognition walls can incorporate a variety of styles, materials, artistic media and interactive multimedia presentations that appear on plasma displays, touch-screen kiosks and LCD screens. Often in contemporary architecture, a donor recognition wall will constitute a major aesthetic feature of a building's lobby area or main hallway. It will frequently incorporate a prominent display of the organization's logo and mission statement.

Many institutions consider a “donor wall” or some kind of comprehensive recognition piece to be the period at the end of the campaign sentence.

== See also ==
- Donor
- Fundraising
- Recognition
