= Laurent Thévenot =

French sociologist

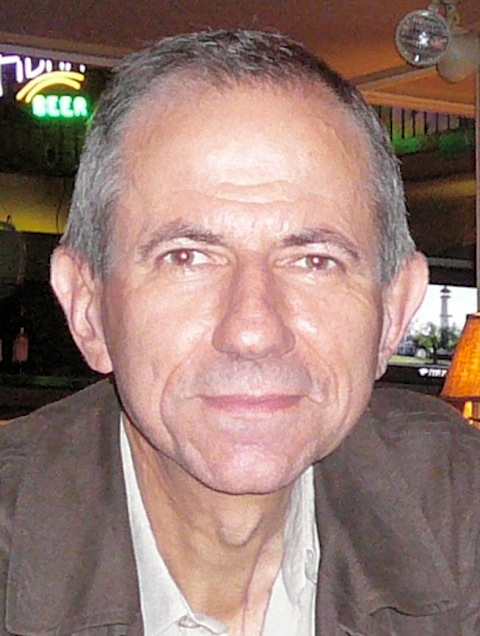
Laurent Thévenot

Laurent Thévenot (French: [lɔʁɑ̃ tevəno]; born 1949) is a French sociologist and Professor at the Ecole des Hautes Etudes en Sciences Sociales (Paris).

== Career ==
After initial research on social coding and investments in forms which contribute to action coordination, he co-initiated in France two trends which rejuvenated the critical social sciences and reached an international audience. With Luc Boltanski, he co-authored On Justification (2006 [1991]) which analyzes the most legitimate repertoires of evaluation and criticism governing political, economic and social relationships. It originated the new "pragmatic" school of French sociology. Thévenot is also one of the founders of the Economics and Sociology of Conventions which has developed an analysis of economic, social and political conventions that regulate uncertain coordination.

L'action au pluriel (2006, translated in Spanish: 2016, La acción en plural. Una introducción a la sociología pragmática, Buenos Aires, Siglo Veintiuno) widens critical approaches to power through the analysis of oppressions on valued regimes people are empowered through by engaging with the environment and with others, from intimacy to the level of public conventions. This analytical framework has contributed to international research networks on: governing by standards and objectives; the politics of quantification; the evolution of the forms of authority, evaluation, and critique; arts of participation and protest; political ecology.

This framework has been developed and tested in collaborative and comparative research on the political and moral grammars used in differing and making things and issues common. Collaborative programs have compared architectures of communities in Western Europe (European Journal of Cultural and Political Sociology, special issue on 'Politics of Engagement in an Age of Differing Voices' co-edited with Eeva Luhtakallio, 2018 5(1–2)), Russia (Revue d'Etudes Comparatives Est-Ouest, special issue on 'Critiquer et agir en Russie' co-edited with Françoise Daucé et Kathy Rousselet, 2017 48(3–4)) and the United States (Comparing Cultures and Polities: Repertoires of Evaluation in France and the United States, co-edited with Michèle Lamont, Cambridge University Press, 2000).

Laurent Thévenot is a member of the scientific committees of the journals Annales, Histoire, Sciences Sociales, European Journal of Cultural and Political Sociology, Historical Social Research, Laboratorium: Russian Review of Social Research.

He is a permanent member of the French Academy of Agriculture.

He is Doctor Honoris Causa of the University of Helsinki and Universidad Nacional del Altiplano (Puno, Peru).
