= Luc Boltanski =

French sociologist

Luc Boltanski (born 4 January 1940 in Paris) is a French sociologist and director of studies at the School for Advanced Studies in the Social Sciences (EHESS). In 1985, he and Laurent Thévenot co-founded the Groupe de sociologie politique et morale at the EHESS. Boltanski is regarded as one of the leading figures in the development of the "pragmatic sociology of critique", and his work has substantially influenced contemporary French sociology and social and political thought.

His major works include On Justification: Economies of Worth (1991), co-authored with Thévenot, and The New Spirit of Capitalism (1999), co-authored with sociologist Ève Chiapello, which examines changes in capitalist management and ideology from the 1960s onward.

== Work ==
Boltanski's research has addressed social class, moral judgement, social criticism, political institutions, the representation of suffering, and the valuation of goods. His early work was conducted at the Centre de sociologie européenne, directed by Pierre Bourdieu, where he contributed to Bourdieusian research on class formation and social reproduction. His 1982 book Les Cadres: La formation d'un groupe social examined the historical construction of the French managerial and professional category of the cadres.

During the 1980s, Boltanski increasingly departed from Bourdieu's model of critical sociology. In 1985, he co-founded the Groupe de sociologie politique et morale at the EHESS with Laurent Thévenot. Their work became associated with the "pragmatic sociology of critique", an approach that examines moral judgement and criticism as they are exercised by ordinary people during disputes. Rather than treating criticism as an activity reserved for sociologists, the approach emphasizes the critical capacities of social actors themselves, including their ability to identify injustice, justify and criticize actions, appeal to principles of legitimacy and test competing claims.

=== On Justification ===
In On Justification: Economies of Worth, first published in French in 1991, Boltanski and Thévenot developed a framework for analysing disputes in which participants are required to justify their actions publicly. They argued that modern societies contain several legitimate "orders of worth", each based on a different conception of the common good. They distinguished inspired, domestic, civic, market, industrial and fame-based orders.

Disagreements can occur within one order, over whether a person or object has passed an appropriate "test", or between actors appealing to different orders. Boltanski and Thévenot described compromises as arrangements that temporarily connect more than one order, such as workers' rights, which may combine civic ideas of equality with industrial concerns about production. Such compromises remain vulnerable because they lack a single principle capable of resolving every dispute.

=== Distant Suffering ===
In La Souffrance à distance (1993), published in English as Distant Suffering: Morality, Media and Politics in 1999, Boltanski examined the moral and political problems faced by spectators who encounter the suffering of distant people through the media but cannot intervene directly. He argued that spectators may nevertheless become involved by speaking publicly about what they have witnessed and attempting to involve others.

Drawing partly on Adam Smith's moral philosophy, Boltanski distinguished three ways of representing and responding to distant suffering. The "topic of denunciation" directs indignation toward a person or group held responsible for the suffering. The "topic of sentiment" emphasizes sympathy, gratitude and assistance, while the "aesthetic topic" treats suffering primarily as an object of contemplation. Boltanski connected these responses to a broader "politics of pity" and concluded by examining what he described as a contemporary crisis of pity in humanitarian politics.

=== The New Spirit of Capitalism ===
In The New Spirit of Capitalism (1999; English translation 2005), co-authored with Ève Chiapello, Boltanski compared French management literature from the 1960s and 1990s to examine a shift from hierarchical and bureaucratic organization toward flexible, network-based work structured around temporary projects.

To describe the principles used to justify this model, Boltanski and Chiapello extended the economies-of-worth framework developed in On Justification by proposing a seventh order of worth, the "projective city". In this order, mobility, adaptability, the formation of connections and the ability to move between projects are treated as marks of worth.

=== The Foetal Condition ===
In La Condition fœtale: Une sociologie de l'engendrement et de l'avortement (2004), published in English as The Foetal Condition: A Sociology of Engendering and Abortion in 2013, Boltanski examined abortion as both a social practice and a problem in the sociology of procreation. The study drew on observations of roughly one hundred cases in hospitals and clinics and forty in-depth interviews with women who had undergone abortions.

Boltanski argued that abortion exposes a tension between the principle that each human being is unique and the fact that not every conceived being is socially recognized and incorporated into a parental project. He distinguished the "authentic foetus", which is integrated into such a project and anticipated as a child, from the "tumoral foetus", which is excluded from the project and treated as an unwanted bodily condition.

The book also develops an anthropological account of "engendering", examining the social processes through which a biological being is recognized as a singular person. Frédéric Keck described the work as combining a sociological investigation of abortion with a phenomenological account of birth and a structuralist analysis of kinship and procreation.

=== Other work ===
Boltanski and Arnaud Esquerre use the term "enrichment economy" for a form of capitalism that connects sectors including luxury goods, art, cultural heritage and tourism through the increased valuation of existing things and places. In this usage, "enrichment" does not simply mean the accumulation of private wealth, but the processes through which the value of objects is increased. Boltanski and Esquerre distinguish price, established when an object changes hands, from value, which provides a justification for that price. Objects may be enriched physically or through narratives emphasizing qualities such as their age, authenticity, rarity, provenance or association with notable people and events. Central to their account is the "collection form", in which an object's value is determined by its position within a collection and its relationship to other collectible objects.

Another strand of Boltanski's research concerns mysteries, conspiracies and inquiry in modern societies. In Mysteries and Conspiracies: Detective Stories, Spy Novels and the Making of Modern Societies (2012; English translation 2014), he examines how detective stories and spy novels illuminate the nature of modern societies and the modern state.

== Personal life ==
Boltanski was born in Paris to a Jewish father of Russian origin and a Corsican Christian mother. During the German occupation of France, his father hid in a concealed space in the family's apartment, while the young Boltanski was told that he had gone away.

His brothers were linguist Jean-Élie Boltanski and artist Christian Boltanski. He is the father of journalist and writer Christophe Boltanski.

== Selected publications ==
- Boltanski, L., 1999, Distant Suffering: Morality, Media and Politics, Cambridge (UK), Cambridge University Press.
- Boltanski, L., Chiapello È., Ross G., Piore M. J., Reid D., Kogut B., 2000, "Forum: Le Nouvel Esprit du capitalisme", French Politics, Culture & Society, vol. 18, n° 3, Fall.
- Boltanski, L., Chiapello (Ève), 2005 [1999],The New Spirit of Capitalism, London-New York, Verso, 2005.
- Boltanski, L., Chiapello (Ève), 2005, "The Role of criticism in the dynamics of capitalism", in: Worlds of Capitalism: Institutions, Economics, Performance and Governance in the Era of Globalisation, Max Miller (Ed), London, Routledge.
- Boltanski, L., Thévenot, L., 2006 [1991], On Justification. The Economies of Worth, Princeton, Princeton University Press.
- Boltanski, L., Nuits, Lyon, ENS Editions, 2008. Note du metteur en scène, Guillaume Pfister. Première création française : avril-mai 2008 au Théâtre Kantor (Lyon) - l'Ecole Normale Supérieure Lettres et Sciences Humaines.
- Boltanski, L., 2011 [2009], On Critique - a Sociology of Emancipation, Cambridge (UK), Polity Press.
- Boltanski, L., 2012 [1990], Love and Justice as Competences - Three Essays on the Sociology of Action (translated by Catherine Porter), Cambridge (UK), Polity Press.
- Boltanski, L., 2014 [2012], Mysteries and Conspiracies - Detective Stories, Spy Novels and the Making of Modern Societies (translated by Catherine Porter), Cambridge (UK), Polity Press.
- Boltanski, L., Fraser (Nancy), Corcuff (Philippe), 2014, Domination et émancipation. Pour un renouveau de la critique sociale, Lyon, Presses Universitaires de Lyon.
- Boltanski, L., Esquerre A., 2014, "La « collection », une forme neuve du capitalisme. La mise en valeur économique du passé et ses effets" (""Collection", a New Form of Capitalism"), Les Temps Modernes, 3/2014 (n°679), p. 5-72.
