= The Old Is Dying and the New Cannot Be Born =

2019 book by Nancy Fraser

The Old Is Dying and the New Cannot Be Born: From Progressive Neoliberalism to Trump and Beyond
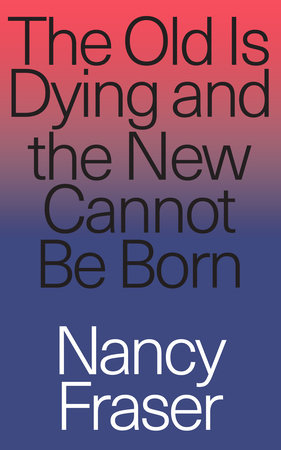
- Author: Nancy Fraser
- Language: English
- Published: 2019
- Publisher: Verso Books
- ISBN: 9781788732727
- Website: Verso website

The Old Is Dying and the New Cannot Be Born: From Progressive Neoliberalism to Trump and Beyond is a 2019 nonfiction book by American author Nancy Fraser, published by Verso Books.

== Overview ==
The book casts the contemporary political landscape as not just an economic system, but economics wedded to authority, the result of a "worldview ... that wedded a progressive politics of recognition with a neoliberal political economy". It provides an "assessment of hegemonic and counterhegemonic blocs", and provides arguments and evidence that challenge the "assumption that expertise is inseparable from objectivity". According to the work, 21st-century authoritarianism in America "is borne from fractured nexus of distribution and recognition on which the authority of the established political classes and political parties has been built". According to the author, the election of Donald Trump as United States President in 2016 indicates the end of the "'progressive-neoliberal' hegemonic order".

The title is a quote of Antonio Gramsci, and refers to his theory of cultural hegemony.
