= Johanna Brenner =

American feminist and sociologist

Johanna Brenner is an American feminist and sociologist whose writing and thought is in the socialist-feminist vein.

A graduate of Reed College (B.A., 1964) and the University of California, Los Angeles (M.A., 1970; Ph.D., 1979), she spent four years as a telephone installation technician worker in the 1970s. In 1981 she began teaching in the sociology department at Portland State University in Portland, Oregon, where she served from 1982 to 2005 as coordinator of its women's studies program. She is now emeritus professor.

Brenner has contributed to New Left Review, Monthly Review, and other periodicals. In 1993 she worked with Catherine Sameh and Kathryn Tetrick to open In Other Words Women's Books and Resources.

Mike Davis has said, "Johanna Brenner writes with a clarity of purpose that arises out of a lifetime of participation in the struggles of working-class women."

== Writings ==
- Brenner, Johanna (July–August 1993). "The best of times, the worst of times: US feminism today". New Left Review. I (200). New Left Review.
- Brenner, Johanna (November 1998). "On gender and class in U.S. labor history". Monthly Review. 50 (6). Monthly Review Foundation: 1. doi:10.14452/MR-050-06-1998-10_1.
- Brenner, Johanna (2000). Women and the politics of class. Monthly Review Press. ISBN 9788187879602.
- Brenner, Johanna; Laslett, Barbara; Arat, Yasmin, eds. (1995). Rethinking the political: women, resistance, and the state. Chicago: University of Chicago Press. ISBN 9780226073996.
