= Ève Chiapello =

French sociologist

Ève Chiapello (born 1965) is professor at the École des hautes études en sciences sociales (EHESS), Paris, where she holds a chair in the "sociology of the transformation of capitalism". She has published numerous articles and books, including Artists Versus Managers (1998) and The New Spirit of Capitalism (French original 1999, with Luc Boltanski), translated into nine languages including English (2005).

== Work ==
Chiapello was born in 1965 in Lyon, France. A graduate of HEC Paris in 1987, she obtained a Master's degree in management of cultural institutions from the Paris Dauphine University in 1988 and one in Social Sciences from ENS-EHESS in 1991. In 1994, she obtained a PhD in Management Sciences from the Paris Dauphine University with a thesis entitled "Modes of control of artistic organizations", and then an accreditation to direct research at the same University. Chiapello worked at HEC Paris from 1989 to February 2013, serving as a permanent faculty member from 1994. There, she co-created and co-directed the Alternative Management major. In March 2013, she became a director of studies at the EHESS, where she holds a chair in the "sociology of the transformations of capitalism".

Chiapello has focused her sociological research on analyzing the nature of artistic critique against capitalism and its cooptation over time from the 1950s and 60s to the present.

Another major research focus has been the "language of capitalism", analyzed by employing the methods of critical discourse analysis to managerial and corporate human resources documents.

These two interests came together in her major work co-authored with Luc Boltanski, The New Spirit of Capitalism. The main thesis of the book, as summarized in a separate article of the same title, is that from the 1970s capitalists began to adopt a libertarian conception of running the workplace, allowing greater employee initiative and autonomy. This was influenced by the powerful currents of 1960s counterculture movements. However, while it adopted the language of these movements, it maintained the capitalist system of exploitation under its guise. Chiapello and Boltanski conclude that this "new spirit of capitalism" is not emancipatory, but rather more subtle in its continuation of exploitation.

In Management Tools: A Social Sciences Perspective (2019) Chiapello and her co-authors subject the field of management to sociological analysis.

== Selected publications ==
- Chiapello È., (1998), Artistes versus managers: Le Management culturel. Paris, Métailié.
- Boltanski, L., Chiapello È., et al. (2000), "Forum: Le Nouvel Esprit du capitalisme", French Politics, Culture & Society, 18(3).
- Chiapello, E., & Fairclough, N. (2002), "Understanding the new management ideology: a transdisciplinary contribution from critical discourse analysis and new sociology of capitalism", Discourse & Society, 13(2), 185–208.
- Boltanski, L., Chiapello È., (2005 [1999]),The New Spirit of Capitalism, London-New York, Verso.
- Boltanski, L., Chiapello È., (2005), "The Role of criticism in the dynamics of capitalism", in: Worlds of Capitalism: Institutions, Economics, Performance and Governance in the Era of Globalisation, Max Miller (Ed), London, Routledge.
- Chiapello, È., (2007), "Accounting and the birth of the notion of capitalism", Critical Perspectives on Accounting, 18(3) 263–296.
- Chiapello, È., & Gilbert, P. (2019), Management tools: A social sciences perspective. Cambridge, Cambridge University Press.
