= Nancy Fraser =

American philosopher (born 1947)

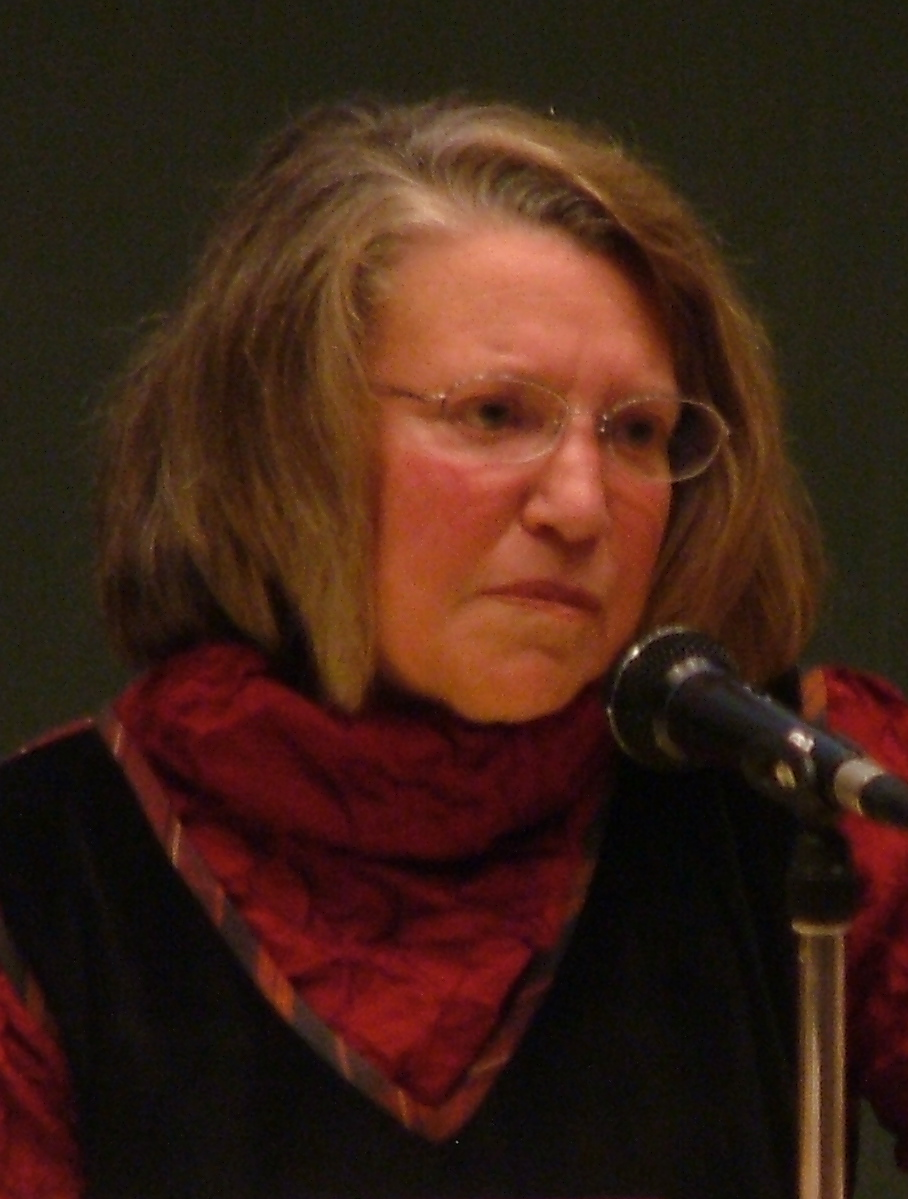
- Fraser in 2008
- Born: May 20, 1947 (age 79); Baltimore, Maryland, US

Education
- Education: Bryn Mawr College (BA); CUNY Graduate Center (PhD)

Philosophical work
- Era: 20th-century philosophy
- Region: Western philosophy
- School: Continental philosophy Critical theory Feminist philosophy Post-Marxism; Post-structuralism; Marxist Feminism
- Institutions: The New School
- Main interests: Political philosophy
- Notable ideas: Recognition justice

Nancy Fraser (/ˈfreɪzər/; born May 20, 1947) is an American philosopher, critical theorist, feminist, and the Henry A. and Louise Loeb Professor Emerita of Political and Social Science and professor of philosophy at The New School in New York City. Widely known for her critique of identity politics and her philosophical work on the concept of justice, Fraser is also a staunch critic of contemporary liberal feminism and its abandonment of social justice issues. Fraser holds honorary doctoral degrees from four universities in three countries, and won the 2010 Alfred Schutz Prize in Social Philosophy from the American Philosophical Association. She was President of the American Philosophical Association Eastern Division for the 2017–2018 term.

== Early life and education ==
Fraser came from a mixed second generation immigrant family, with a Jewish father and a mother of Irish Catholic and Jewish heritage. Her father's parents were Eastern European immigrants of primarily Lithuanian and Polish descent. Her maternal grandmother's family was of Irish Catholic descent. Her grandmother's father was a Jewish peddler. She describes her parents as "Jewish and very Jewish-identified", but not religious. She had a bat mitzvah and attended High Holiday services at synagogue. She earned her bachelor's degree in philosophy at Bryn Mawr College in 1969, and a PhD in philosophy from the CUNY Graduate Center in 1980.

== Career ==
She taught in the philosophy department at Northwestern University for many years before moving to the New School in 1995. She has been a visiting professor at universities in Germany, France, Spain, and the Netherlands. In addition to her many publications and lectures, Fraser is a former co-editor of Constellations, an international journal of critical and democratic theory, where she remains an active member of the Editorial Council. She has been invited to deliver the Tanner Lectures at Stanford University and the Spinoza Lectures at the University of Amsterdam. In 2024, a job offer to give lectures at the University of Cologne was rescinded after it was discovered that Fraser had signed a letter "Philosophy for Palestine" that did not accept Israel's right to exist. Fraser called the decision to disinvite her "philosemitic McCarthyism".

== Research ==
Fraser has written on a wide variety of issues, but she is primarily known for her work on the philosophical conceptions of justice and injustice. Fraser argues that justice can be understood in three separate but interrelated ways: distributive justice (in terms of a more equitable distribution of resources), recognition justice (the recognition of difference between social identities and groups) and the later-introduced representative justice (the entitlement for individuals to a just distribution and reciprocal recognition). There are three corresponding forms of injustice: maldistribution, misrecognition and misrepresentation, which, in its deepest form, Fraser calls misframing.

Fraser argues that many social justice movements in the 1960s and 1970s argued for recognition on the basis of race, gender, sexuality, or ethnicity, and that the focus on correcting misrecognition eclipsed the importance of challenging the persistent problems of maldistribution. In other words, Fraser asserts that too much of a focus on identity politics diverts attention from the deleterious effects of neoliberal capitalism and the growing wealth inequality that characterizes many societies.

In more recent work, Fraser goes even further in linking the narrow focus of identity politics with the widening gap between the rich and poor, particularly with regard to liberal feminism, which Fraser calls the "handmaiden" of capitalism. Reflecting on Sheryl Sandberg's 2013 book Lean In, Fraser explained:

For me, feminism is not simply a matter of getting a smattering of individual women into positions of power and privilege within existing social hierarchies. It is rather about overcoming those hierarchies. This requires challenging the structural sources of gender domination in capitalist society — above all, the institutionalized separation of two supposedly distinct kinds of activity: on the one hand, so-called "productive" labor, historically associated with men and remunerated by wages; on the other hand, "caring" activities, often historically unpaid and still performed mainly by women. In my view, this gendered, hierarchical division between "production" and "reproduction" is a defining structure of capitalist society and a deep source of the gender asymmetries hard-wired in it. There can be no "emancipation of women" so long as this structure remains intact.

In March 2022, she was amongst 151 international feminists signing Feminist Resistance Against War: A Manifesto, in solidarity with the Russian Feminist Anti-War Resistance. (Note: This manifesto was criticized by both Ukrainian feminists and members of the Feminist Anti-War Resistance themselves.)

== Books ==
=== Fortunes of Feminism ===
Fortunes of Feminism: From State-Managed Capitalism to Neoliberal Crisis is a collection of essays written from 1985 to 2010 that aims at dissecting the "drama in three acts" that according to the author is the thread of second-wave feminism. Act one represents the moment when the feminist movement joined radical movements to transform society through uncovering gender injustice and capitalism's androcentrism, while act two, Fraser highlights with regret, is a switch from redistribution to recognition and difference and a shift to identity politics that risk to support neoliberalism through efforts to build a free-market society. Foreseeing act three as a revival of the movement, Fraser argues for a reinvigorated feminist radicalism able to address the global economic crisis. Feminism must be a force working in concert with other egalitarian movements in the struggle to bring the economy under democratic control, while building on the visionary potential of the earlier waves of women's liberation.

The work is considered an important contribution as it provides a clear frame to rethink issues related to labor, emancipation, identity, rights claims at the core of political demands of justice in the contemporary context of neoliberalism. Although a necessary incorporation of political economy into contemporary feminist discourse, Fraser's use of theoretical schemas has been criticized as dense and baffling at times—it is unclear, for example, why there are three types of needs discourses, four registers of dependency, or seven principles of gender justice. M. E. Mitchell, writer for Marx & Philosophy, writes "This [complexity] is, perhaps, owing to her propensity to avail herself of whatever terms best encapsulate processes of institutionalized oppression. Thinking thus, from the ground up, gives her work a complexity that at times compromises the systematic quality and coherence of her theoretical categories."

=== Unruly Practices ===
Unruly Practices: Power, Discourse, and Gender in Contemporary Social Theory is a collection of essays written between 1980 and 1989. The book examines the theories of power and source in Foucault, the politics of French deconstruction and Richard Rorty, the politics of gender in Habermas, and the politics of need interpretation in two concluding essays which delineate her own position within contemporary socialist-feminist critical theory. Contemporaries such as Douglas Kellner have praised Fraser's writings as "seasoned with social hope" and effectively synthesizing feminist commitment to political agency and social progress with several forms of modern and postmodern social skepticism. However, others have criticized her goal of providing "the sort of big diagnostic picture necessary to orient [the current] political practice" of socialist feminism for being both too ambitious and ultimately too narrow. Patricia S. Mann, for example, summarizes the pitfalls of the text as follows:

I wish Fraser had made more of an effort to call upon the resources of analytic philosophy. It is true that analytic philosophers look all the way back to Immanuel Kant and Jeremy Bentham for their paradigms of analytic philosophy. Unfazed because untouched by these notions of social constitution of individuals, or by the irrationalities of individual thought, philosophy offers an outmoded yet still seaworthy vessel for any seeking to ride out the storms of postmodern disillusionment with notions of agency and process. Had Fraser utilized the works of analytic political thinkers when she finally came to formulate her socialist-feminist theory of the welfare state she could have exploited the admittedly "thin" theories of political agency and political rights within political philosophy today.

== Awards and honors ==
- Doctor Honoris Causa, Erasmus School of History, Culture and Communication and Faculty of Philosophy, Erasmus University Rotterdam, 2014.
- Doctor Honoris Causa, Universidad Nacional de San Martin, Buenos Aires, Argentina, 2014.
- International Research Chair in Social Justice, Collège d'études mondiales, Paris, 2011-2016
- Senior Fellow, Center for Advanced Studies "Justitia Amplificata," Frankfurt, 2013.
- Rosa Luxemburg Foundation Fellow, November–December 2012.
- Einstein Visiting Fellow, JFK Institute for North American Studies, Freie Universität, Berlin, 2010–2012.
- Humanitas Visiting Professor in Women's Rights, University of Cambridge, UK, March 2011
- Doctor Honoris Causa, Roskilde University, Denmark, 2011.
- Donald Gordon Fellow, Stellenbosch Institute for Advanced Studies, South Africa, 2011.
- Alfred Schutz Prize in Social Philosophy, American Philosophical Association, 2010.
- Chaire Blaise Pascal, École des hautes études en sciences sociales, Paris, 2008-2010
- Awarded the Doctor Honoris Causa, by the National University of Cordoba (Argentina), 2006.
- American Academy of Arts and Sciences Fellow, 2019.
- Karl Polanyi Visiting Professorship, 2021.
- Knight of the Legion of Honor of France
- Nessim Habif World Prize, University of Geneva, 12 October 2018
- Nonino Prize 2022 "Master of Our Time", Italy, 2022.
- Rudolf Andorka Medal, Rajk College for Advanced Studies, Budapest, 2025
- Omnis Scientia Omne Ius, Law School National Autonomous University of Mexico, Mexico City, 04 March 2026

== Writings ==
Books

- Fraser, Nancy (1989). Unruly practices: power, discourse, and gender in contemporary social theory. Minneapolis: University of Minnesota Press. ISBN 9780816617784.
- Fraser, Nancy (1997). Justice interruptus: critical reflections on the "postsocialist" condition. New York: Routledge. ISBN 9780415917940.
- Fraser, Nancy; Honneth, Axel (2003). Redistribution or recognition?: A political-philosophical exchange. London New York: Verso. ISBN 9781859844922.
- Fraser, Nancy (2009). Scales of justice: reimagining political space in a globalizing world. New York: Columbia University Press. ISBN 9780231519625.
- Le féminisme en mouvements: des années 1960 à l'ère néolibérale (in French, co-authored with Estelle Ferrarese.) Paris: La Découverte, 2012. ISBN 9782707194534.
- Fraser, Nancy (2013). Fortunes of feminism: from state-managed capitalism to neoliberal crisis. Brooklyn, New York: Verso Books. ISBN 9781844679850.
- Fraser, Nancy; et al. (July 8, 2014). Nash, Kate (ed.). Transnationalizing the Public Sphere. Cambridge, UK. ISBN 978-0-7456-5058-6. LCCN 2020275243. OCLC 815364610. OL 26861781M.
- Fraser, Nancy; Boltanski, Luc; Corcuff, Philippe (2014). Domination et émancipation, pour un renouveau de la critique sociale (in French). Lyon: Presses Universitaires de Lyon. ISBN 9782729708863.
- Arruzza, Cinzia; Bhattacharya, Tithi; Fraser, Nancy (2019). Feminism for the 99%: A Manifesto. Verso. ISBN 9781788734424.
- Fraser, Nancy (2019). The Old Is Dying and the New Cannot Be Born. Verso Books. ISBN 9781788732727.
- Fraser, Nancy (2022). Cannibal Capitalism. Verso Books. ISBN 9781839761232.

Edited books and select contributions to edited volumes

- Fraser, Nancy; Bartky, Sandra Lee (1992). Revaluing French feminism: critical essays on difference, agency, and culture. Bloomington: Indiana University Press. ISBN 9780253206824.
- Fraser, Nancy; Benhabib, Seyla; Butler, Judith; Cornell, Drucilla (1995). Feminist contentions: a philosophical exchange. New York: Routledge. ISBN 9780415910866.
- Fraser, Nancy; Gordon, Linda (1995), "A genealogy of dependency: tracing a keyword of the U.S. Welfare State", in Brenner, Johanna; Laslett, Barbara; Arat, Yasmin (eds.), Rethinking the political: women, resistance, and the state, Chicago: University of Chicago Press, pp. 33–60, ISBN 9780226073996.
- Fraser, Nancy (1997), "Structuralism or pragmatics?: on discourse theory and feminist politics", in Nicholson, Linda (ed.), The second wave: a reader in feminist theory, New York: Routledge, pp. 379–395, ISBN 9780415917612.
- Fraser, Nancy (1998), "From redistribution to recognition? Dilemmas of justice in a "post-socialist" age", in Willett, Cynthia (ed.), Theorizing multiculturalism: a guide to the current debate, Malden, Massachusetts: John Wiley & Sons, pp. 19–49, ISBN 9780631203421.
- Fraser, Nancy (1998), "A rejoinder to Iris Young", in Willett, Cynthia (ed.), Theorizing multiculturalism: a guide to the current debate, Malden, Massachusetts: John Wiley & Sons, pp. 68–72, ISBN 9780631203421.
- Fraser, Nancy (2008). Olson, Kevin (ed.). Adding insult to injury: Nancy Fraser debates her critics. London New York: Verso. ISBN 9781859842232.
- Fraser, Nancy; Rockhill, Gabriel; Gomez-Muller, Alfredo (2011). Politics of culture and the spirit of critique dialogues. New York: Columbia University Press. ISBN 9780231151870.
- Fraser, Nancy (2013). Fortunes of feminism: from state-managed capitalism to neoliberal crisis. Brooklyn, New York: Verso Books. ISBN 9781844679843.
- Fraser, Nancy; Jaeggi, Rahel (2018). Capitalism: A Conversation in Critical Theory. Polity Press. ISBN 9780745671567.

Journal articles

- Fraser, Nancy (January 1989). "Talking about needs: Interpretive contests as political conflicts in welfare-state societies". Ethics. 99 (2). University of Chicago Press: 291–313. doi:10.1086/293067. JSTOR 2381436. S2CID 154758655.
- Fraser, Nancy (Spring 1994). "After the family wage: what do women want in social welfare?". Social Justice. 21 (1): 80–86. doi:10.1177/0090591794022004003. JSTOR 29766787. S2CID 145797094.
- Fraser, Nancy (June 2001). "Recognition without ethics?" (PDF). Theory, Culture & Society. 18 (2–3). Sage: 21–42. doi:10.1177/02632760122051760. S2CID 55858358. Archived from the original (PDF) on February 24, 2019.
- Fraser, Nancy (September 2005). "Mapping the feminist imagination: from redistribution to recognition to representation". Constellations. 12 (3). Wiley: 295–307. doi:10.1111/j.1351-0487.2005.00418.x.
