= Urs Jaeggi =

Swiss sociologist, painter, and author (1931–2021)

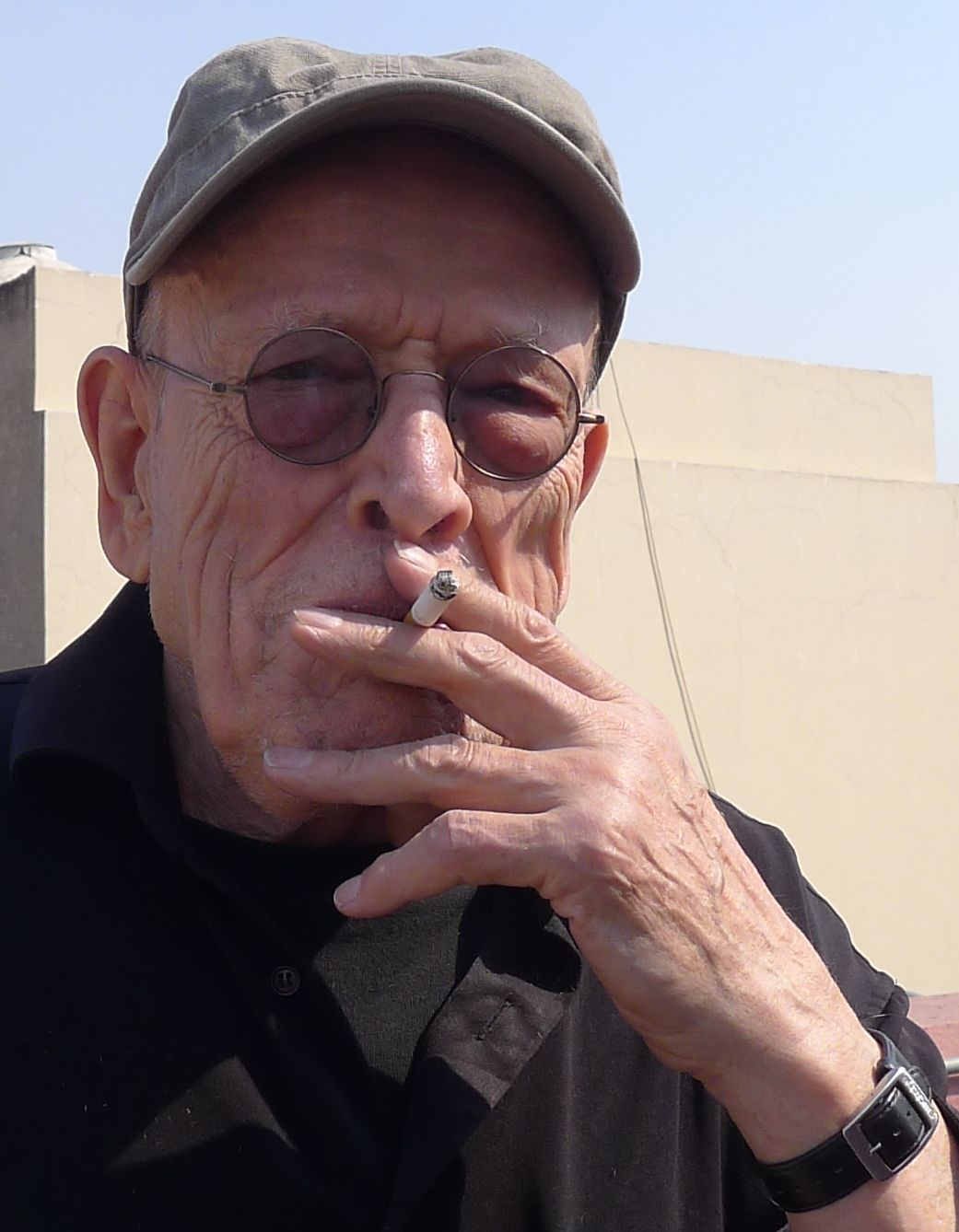
Urs Jaeggi.

Urs Jaeggi (23 June 1931 – 13 February 2021) was a Swiss sociologist, writer, and visual artist. He taught in Münster, Bern, Bochum, New York, and Berlin, and from 1972 to 1993 was a professor at the Free University of Berlin. He became known through his book Macht und Herrschaft in der Bundesrepublik Deutschland, was associated with the student movement of the 1960s, and won the Ingeborg Bachmann Prize in 1981.

== Biography ==
Jaeggi was born in Solothurn on 23 June 1931. After his father died when he was twelve, he completed a bank apprenticeship and later obtained the Matura before studying economics and sociology in Geneva, Bern, and Berlin, receiving a doctorate in Bern in 1959.

From 1959 to 1961 he held an assistant post at the Social Research Center of the University of Münster, and from 1961 to 1964 at the Institute of Sociology of the University of Bern. In 1965 he was appointed professor in Bern. From 1966 to 1972 he taught at the University of Bochum, in 1972 at the New School for Social Research in New York, and from 1972 to 1993 at the Free University of Berlin.

Jaeggi became known through his book Macht und Herrschaft in der Bundesrepublik Deutschland, which sold more than 400,000 copies, and was associated with the student movement of the 1960s. Alongside his academic work, he published novels, short stories, and essays, and in 1981 he won the Ingeborg Bachmann Prize.

From 1982 he also worked as a visual artist. From 1985 onward, he participated in solo and group exhibitions as a painter and sculptor in Germany and abroad. He later divided his time between Berlin and Mexico City. Jaeggi died in Berlin on 13 February 2021 at the age of 89.
