= Alice Bota =

Polish journalist and writer

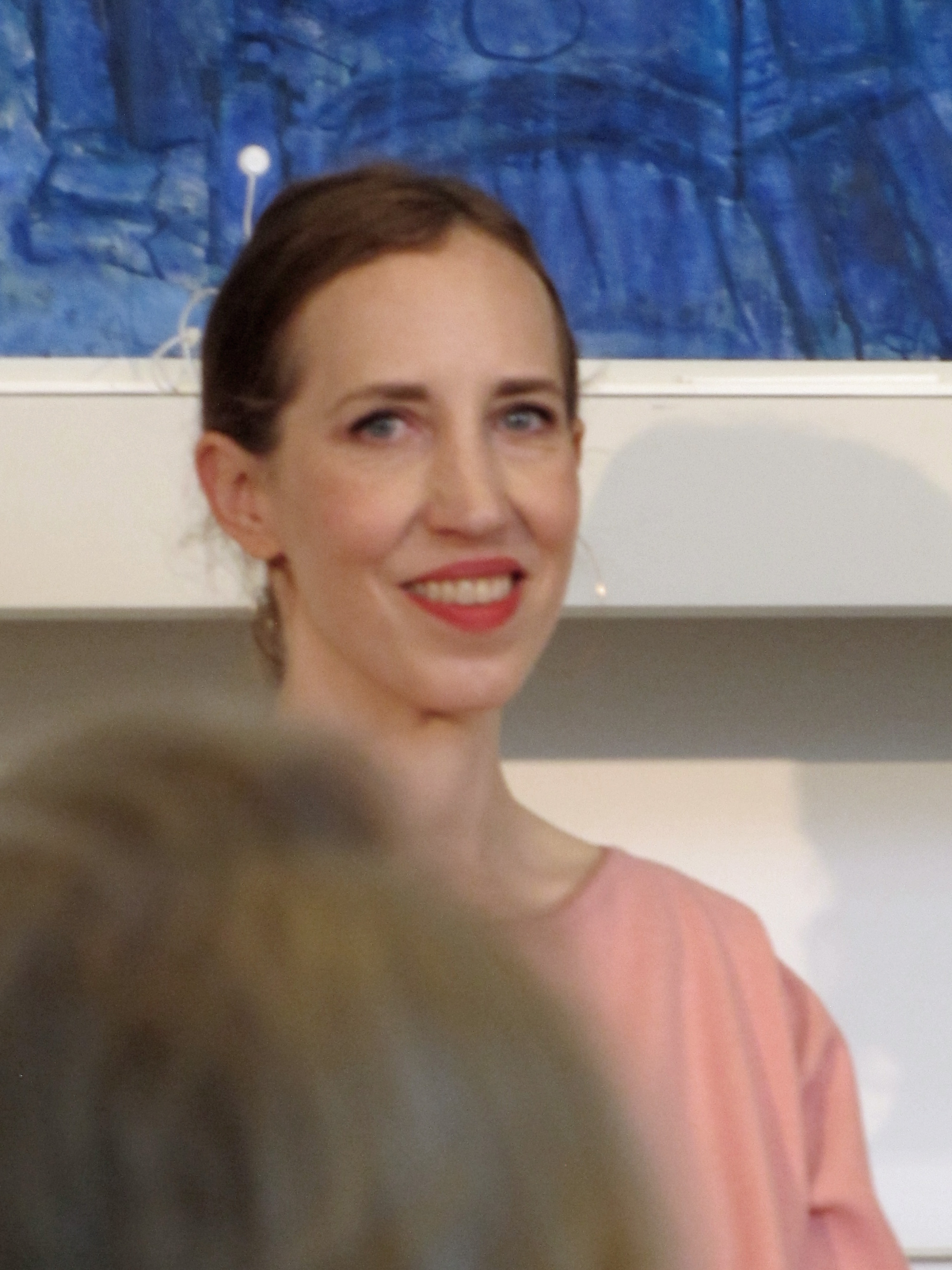
- Born: 15 December 1979 (age 46); Krapkowice, Poland
- Education: University of Kiel; Adam Mickiewicz University in Poznań
- Occupations: Journalist; Author
- Organizations: Die Zeit
- Awards: Axel-Springer-Preis

Alice Bota (born 15 December 1979) is a German journalist, presently working for the weekly Die Zeit, and a book author. Born in Poland, she studied in both Germany and Poland and focuses on topics of Eastern Europe.

== Career ==
Born in Krapkowice, Poland, Bota grew up in Upper Silesia. Her family emigrated to Germany in 1988 and settled first in Hamburg. She received her Abitur in 1999 from the gymnasium in Pinneberg. She studied German literature, political science and sociology at the University of Kiel, and won a scholarship in 2001 to further study International Relations at the Adam Mickiewicz University in Poznań. She continued her studies in Berlin and Potsdam, and wrote her thesis partly in Warsaw.

From 2005 Bota studied at the Deutsche Journalistenschule in Munich. An internship at weekly newspaper Die Zeit during that time led to her employment as a political correspondent in 2007. Her main emphasis was on Eastern Europe. She also worked as a correspondent reporting for Tagesschau in Ukraine. Since 2015, she has been working as Moscow correspondent for Die Zeit.

Bota has been a regular guest on the political talkshow Presseclub to discuss issues related to the political developments in Ukraine. In May 2015, Bota took part in a Streitraum panel discussion about the conflict between Russia and Ukraine at the Schaubühne in Berlin, moderated by Carolin Emcke.

In 2012, together with Khuê Pham and Özlem Topçu, Bota published the book Wir neuen Deutschen (We new Germans), which coined the term "Neue Deutsche".

== Awards ==
In 2009 Bota was awarded the Axel-Springer-Preis for young journalists for her article "Wo Geburt und Tod sich treffen".
