= Streitraum =

Political panel discussion held in Berlin, Germany

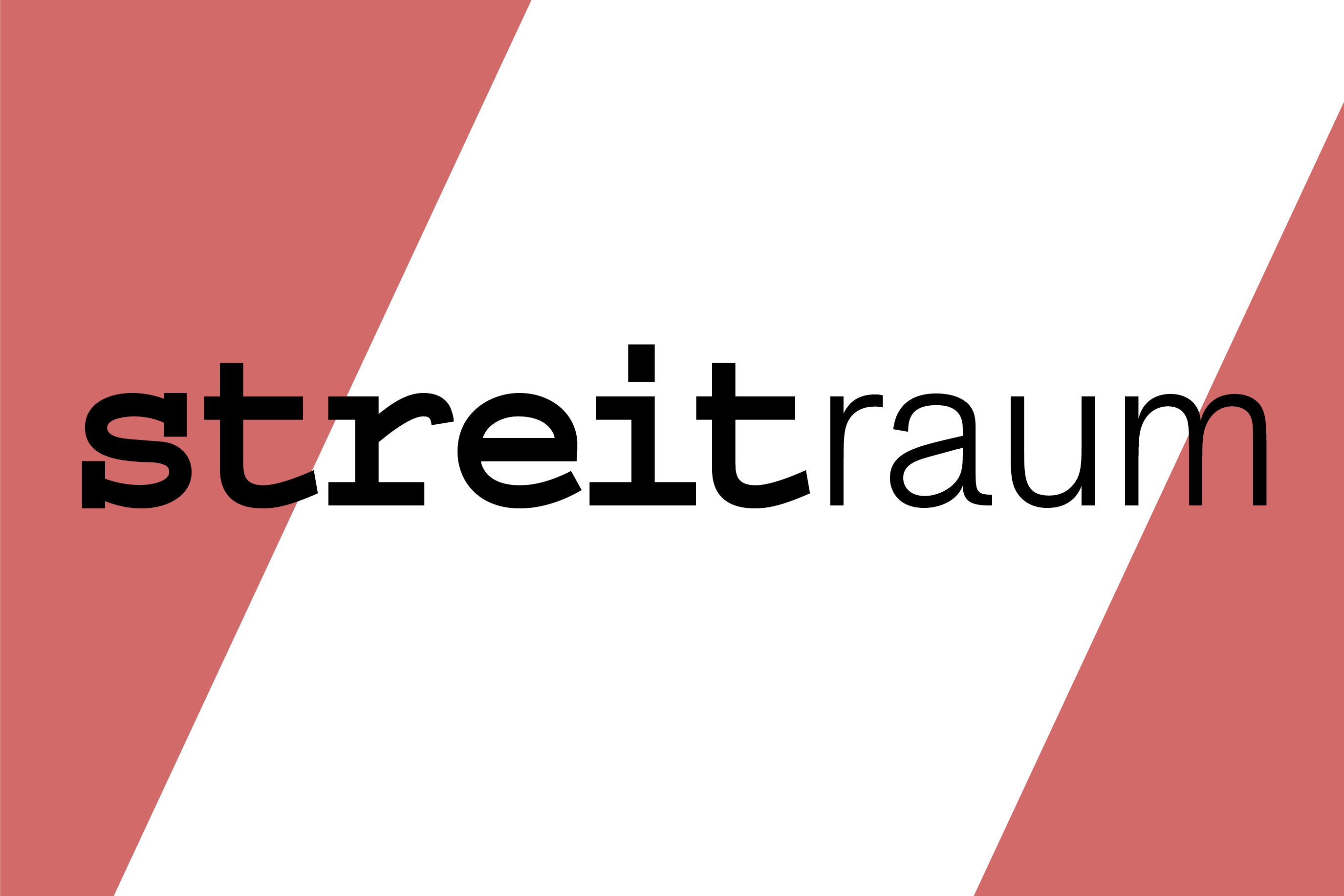
- Genre: political panel discussion
- Frequency: 4 to 6 weeks
- Locations: Schaubühne, Lehniner Platz, Berlin
- Inaugurated: 2000; 26 years ago
- People: Carolin Emcke
- Website: www.schaubuehne.de/de/seiten/streitraumkonzept.html

Streitraum ("conflict room", or "space for dispute") is a series of public panel discussions held at the Schaubühne in Berlin since January 2000. Each season focuses on a different theme from the areas of politics and society. In moderated discussions held every four to six weeks before an audience of international guests, invited experts discuss topics from the areas of politics, culture, technology, media, and the human and natural sciences. The series has been organised and moderated by Carolin Emcke since 2004. Emcke states at the opening of each event that Streitraum is not a forum for arguments and conflict but rather an opportunity to watch people think. Each session ends with questions from the audience.

Jason Farago of BBC Culture has regarded Streitraum as "an intelligent and aggressive public lecture series".

== A season as an example ==
The theme of the 2014–15 season was Auf der Suche nach der Demokratie – oder: Öffentlichkeit und Misstrauen (In search of democracy – or: Publicity and mistrust). The season opened with Keine Demokratie. Nirgends?, a discussion with Deirdre Curtin, professor of European law, on the role of the economy and secret services in politics. In the second event, Alain Badiou and Thomas Ostermeier discussed the legitimacy and authority of democracy from the perspective of philosophy and theatre.

Two discussions were dedicated to the Russo-Ukrainian war. The title Denk ich an Russland ... (When I think of Russia ..., after Heine's Denk ich an Deutschland ...) was given to the discussions between Emcke and her guests – who included Alice Bota, Nino Haratischwili and Katja Petrowskaja – about the relevance of fiction to an evaluation of the actual political situation in these regions. Another discussion, Rechtsradikalismus – im blinden Fleck der Demokratie? (Far-right politics – in the blind spot of democracy?), with Aiman Mazyek, Christoph Möllers, Özlem Topçu and Antonia von der Behrens, covered German domestic policy, focusing on the NSU.

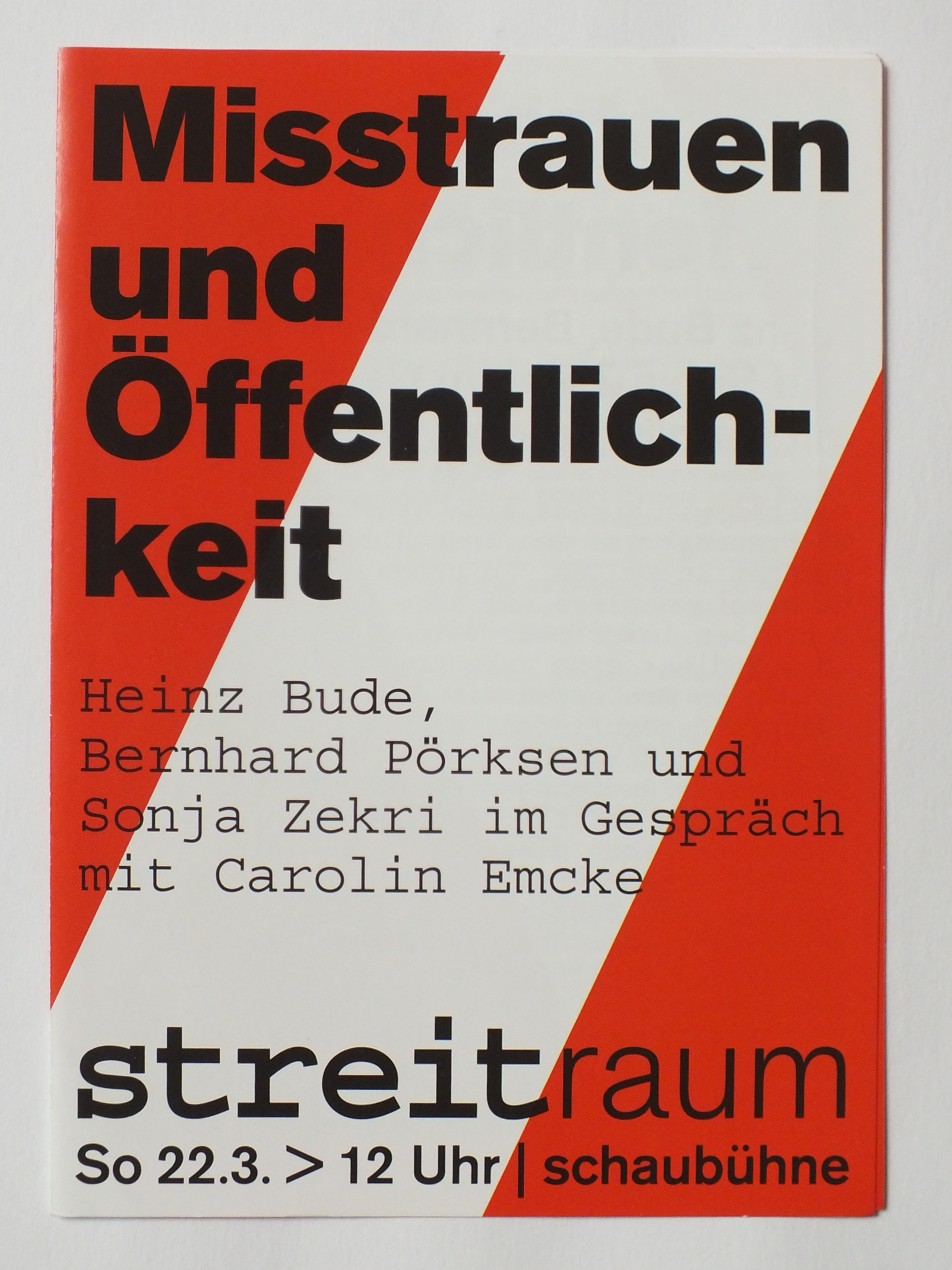
Flyer for the event Misstrauen und Öffentlichkeit on 22 March 2015

A month later Emcke and her guest, the Indian-American author Suketu Mehta, explored the relationship between people and their cities, while the following discussion, Misstrauen und Öffentlichkeit (Misrust and publicity), with Heinz Bude, Bernhard Pörksen and Sonja Zekri, focused on the crisis of trust in journalism. The next event was related to a play performed at the Schaubühne, Milo Rau's The Civil Wars, which was in 2015 part of the Festival Internationale Neue Dramatik (F.I.N.D.). The author Gudrun Krämer and politician Franziska Brantner (MdB) discussed with Emcke the Frage nach der Idee von Europa inmitten der Herausforderungen von Radikalisierung, Entsolidarisierung und Gewalt (Questioning the idea of Europe, in the light of radicalism, less solidarity, and violence). In the final event, Klaus Theweleit drew connections between his analysis of Die Lust am Töten (The desire to kill) and the political discourse on violence.

== Streitraum Extra ==
Occasionally, events unrelated to the season's theme are held under the name of Streitraum Extra. For example, the Streitraum Extra discussions of 2013 included Asyl in Deutschland!? Zur Situation der Flüchtlinge in Deutschland 20 Jahre nach dem "Asylkompromiss" (Asylum in Germany?); Eine ausgesandte Frage, with David Grossman; and Macht, Sexualität und Gewalt (Power, Sexuality, and Violence), with Andreas Huckele.

The December 2015 Streitraum Extra was dedicated to refugees with a reading of pertinent texts, with Lars Eidinger, Nina Hoss, Eva Meckbach, Terézia Mora, Thomas Ostermeier, Katja Petrowskaja, Najem Wali, Liao Yiwu, and Carolin Emcke participating. It was held as a charity event for Pro Asyl.
