= Heribert Prantl =

German journalist and author (born 1953)

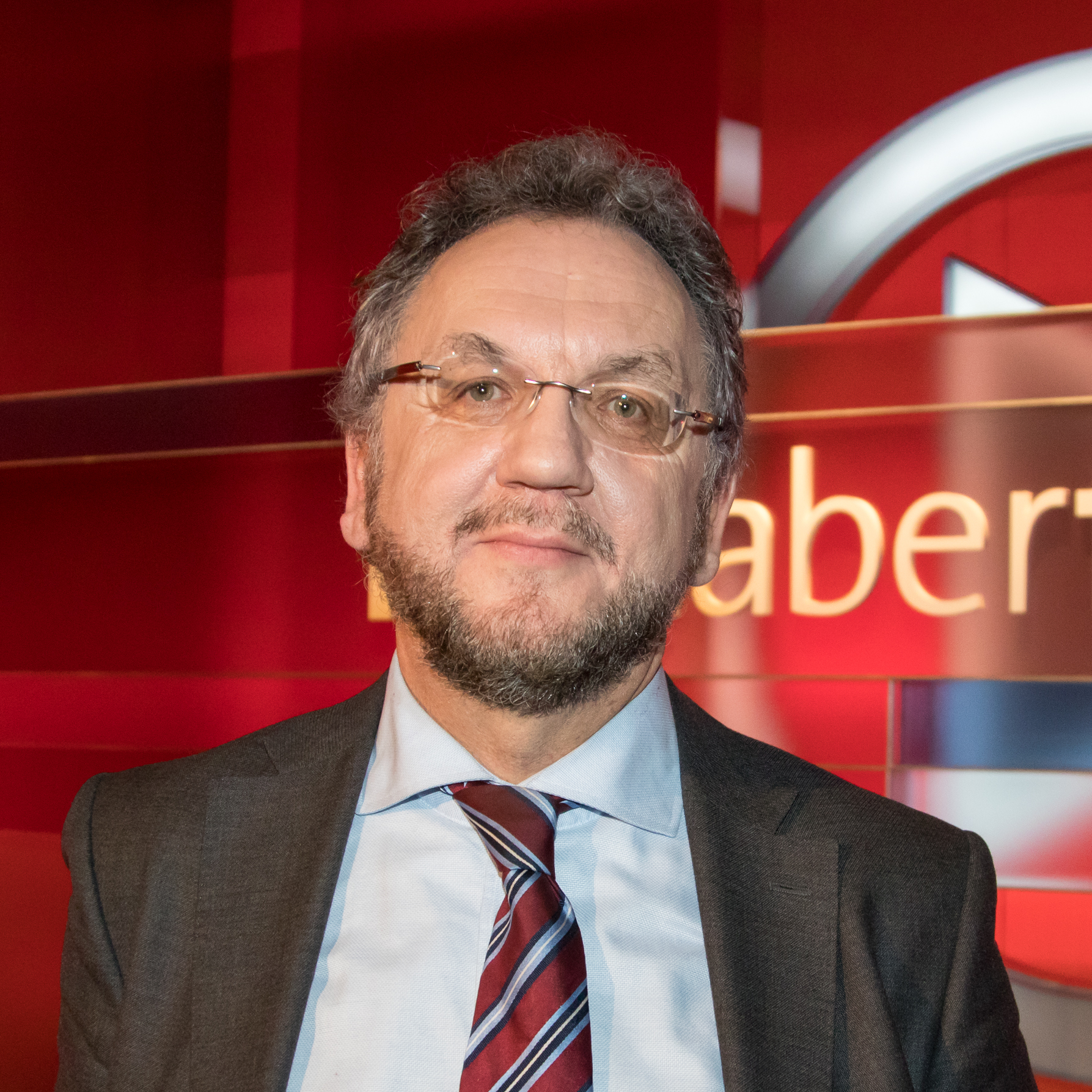
- Prantl in 2017
- Born: 30 July 1953 (age 72); Nittenau, West Germany
- Occupation: Journalist
- Known for: Books, speeches, civil rights engagement

Signature
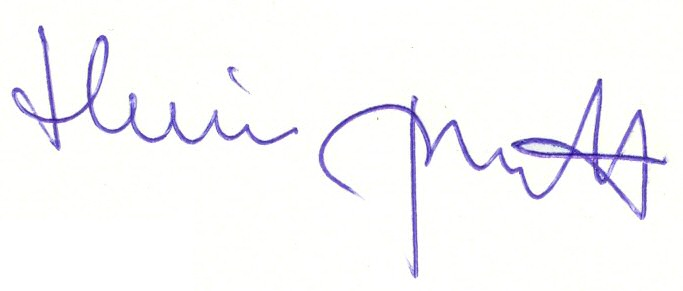

Heribert Prantl (born 30 July 1953 in Nittenau, West Germany) is a German author, journalist and jurist (former judge, prosecutor and lawyer). At the Süddeutsche Zeitung he was head of the department of domestic policy from 1995 to 2017, head of the department "opinion" from 2018 to 2019, member of the chief editors from 2011 to 2019 and is now columnist and author. Since 2002 he has been a lecturer at the faculty of law at Bielefeld University, where he was appointed honorary professor in 2010.

== Early life and family ==
Prantl was born in Nittenau in Bavaria on 30 July 1953. A stipendiary of the Catholic "Cusanuswerk", he studied law, philosophy and history at the University of Regensburg and earned his juris doctor. Afterwards he studied journalism and worked as a judge as well as a public prosecutor.

== Work as a journalist ==
In 1988, Prantl started working for the Süddeutsche Zeitung (SZ) in the department for domestic policy with focus on legal policy. In 1992 he was promoted to deputy head of the department and 1995 he became the head of the department. As of 1 March 2019 he stepped down from duties as head of the opinion department and as a member of the editorial board. He continues to work at the SZ as a writer and columnist, writing a weekly column on political and societal issues under the headline Prantls Blick for the paper's weekend edition. He also publishes under his own name and website. In an interview with the Tagesspiegel, Prantl said he did not believe in rigid pension regulations, especially not in the journalism profession.

Considered a social liberal by many, Prantl has achieved a reputation of being a defender of a liberal and cosmopolitan society that respects the basic rights of all people.

== Other work ==
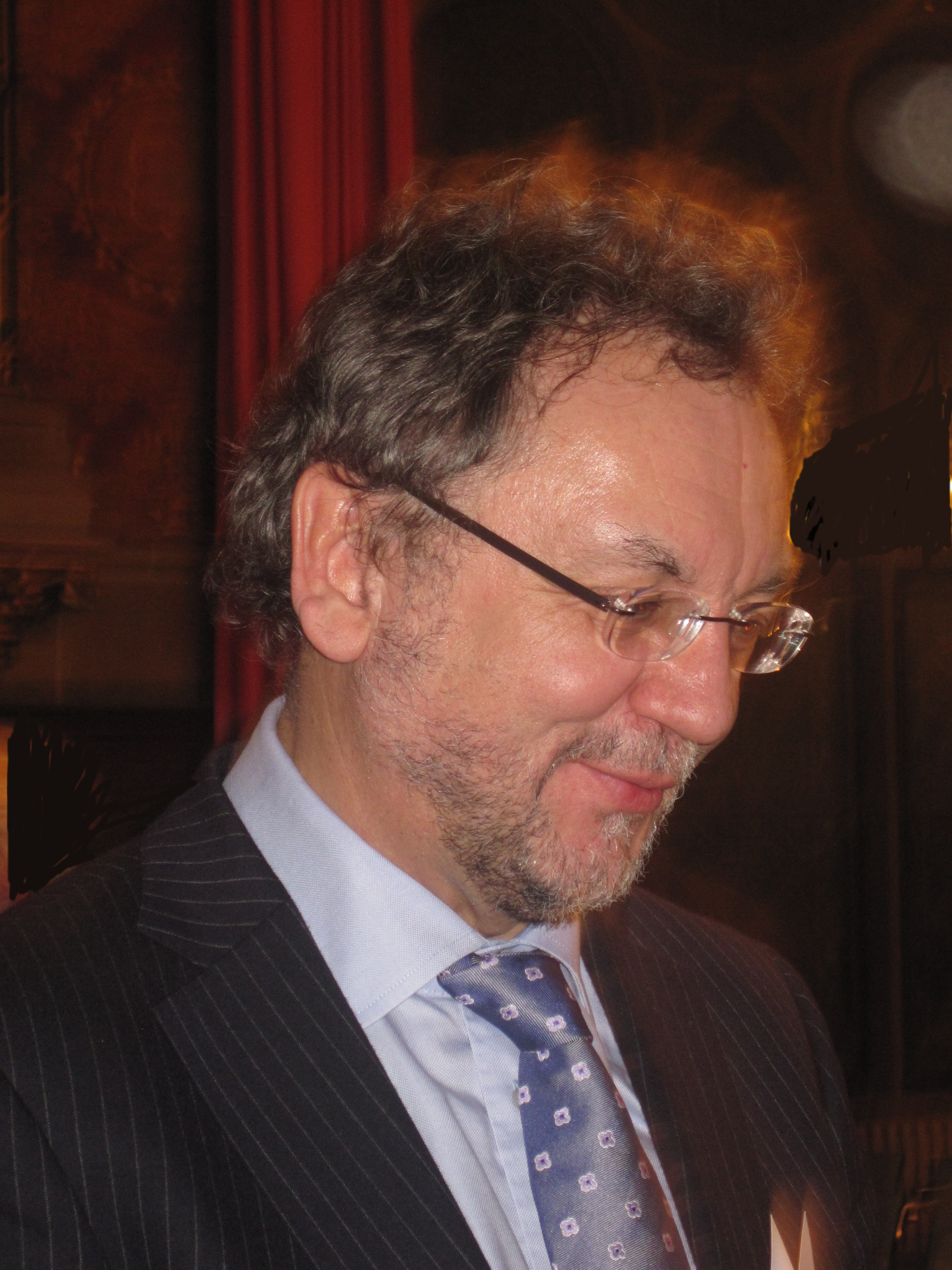
Heribert Prantl (2013)

Apart from his work as a journalist, Prantl is a critically acclaimed author of political commentary, especially concerning basic liberties and the rule of law. He also appears often on ARD radio stations as a commentator for current domestic affairs and the ARD programme Presseclub.

Prantl is also a lecturer for journalism at the Akademie für Publizistik in Hamburg and at the Institut zur Förderung publizistischen Nachwuchses in Munich. He has also been a member of the UNICEF National Committee of Germany, European Law Students' Association Germany Chapter advisory board, and Reporters Without Borders Germany Board of Trustees.

== Awards ==
- 2006: Erich-Fromm-Preis (together with Hans Leyendecker)
- 2012: Brothers Grimm Prize of the University of Marburg

== Bibliography ==
- Die journalistische Information zwischen Ausschlußrecht und Gemeinfreiheit. Eine Studie zum sogenannten Nachrichtenschutz, zum mittelbaren Schutz der journalistischen Information durch § 1 UWG und zum Exklusivvertrag über journalistische Informationen. Verlag E.u.W. Gieseking, Bielefeld 1983, ISBN 3-7694-0199-9
- Deutschland – leicht entflammbar. Ermittlungen gegen die Bonner Politik. Carl Hanser Verlag, München/Wien 1994, ISBN 3-446-17691-8
- Heribert Prantl: The Justice administration in the cage of politics. What would happen if Italian Public prosecutors investigated German politicians? in: European legal cultures. Dartmouth Publishing, Aldershot; Brookfield 1996, page 358, ISBN 978-1-8552-1526-9
- Heribert Prantl [Hg.]: Wehrmachtsverbrechen. Eine deutsche Kontroverse. Hoffmann und Campe Verlag, Hamburg 1997, ISBN 3-455-10365-0
- Sind wir noch zu retten? Anstiftung zum Widerstand gegen eine gefährliche Politik. Carl Hanser Verlag, München/Wien 1998, ISBN 3-446-18541-0
- Rot-Grün – Eine erste Bilanz. Hoffmann und Campe Verlag, Hamburg 1999, ISBN 3-455-10383-9
- Hans Leyendecker, Heribert Prantl, Michael Stiller: Helmut Kohl, die Macht und das Geld. Steidl Verlag, Göttingen 2000, ISBN 3-88243-738-3
- Heribert Prantl, Thomas Vormbaum [pub.]: Juristisches Zeitgeschehen 2000 in der Süddeutschen Zeitung. Nomos Verlagsgesellschaft, Baden-Baden 2001, ISBN 3-7890-7540-X
- Arthur Kaufmann/Heribert Prantl, Was der Mensch dem Menschen schuldet. Carl Heymanns Verlag, Köln/Berlin/Bonn/München, Sonderdruck 2001
- Heribert Prantl: Battle Without Borders: The War Against Terror – Infinite Punishment. World Press Review, Vol. 48 No. 12, 2001, p. 10.
- Verdächtig – Der starke Staat und die Politik der inneren Unsicherheit. Europa Verlag, Hamburg 2002, ISBN 3-203-81041-7
- Heribert Prantl, Thomas Vormbaum [pub.]: Juristisches Zeitgeschehen 2001 in der Süddeutschen Zeitung. Nomos Verlagsgesellschaft, Baden-Baden 2002, ISBN 3-7890-8298-8
- Heribert Prantl, Thomas Vormbaum [pub.]: Juristisches Zeitgeschehen 2002 in der Süddeutschen Zeitung. Berliner Wissenschafts-Verlag, Berlin 2003, ISBN 3-8305-0618-X
- Heribert Prantl, Thomas Vormbaum [pub.]: Juristisches Zeitgeschehen 2003 in der Süddeutschen Zeitung. Berliner Wissenschafts-Verlag, Berlin 2004, ISBN 3-8305-0882-4
- Heribert Prantl, Thomas Vormbaum [pub.]: Juristisches Zeitgeschehen 2004 in der Süddeutschen Zeitung. Berliner Wissenschafts-Verlag, Berlin 2005, ISBN 3-8305-1062-4
- Heribert Prantl: Kein schöner Land – Die Zerstörung der sozialen Gerechtigkeit. Droemer Verlag, München 2005, ISBN 3-426-27363-2
- Heribert Prantl im Gespräch mit Hans-Jochen Vogel: Politik und Anstand. Warum wir ohne Werte nicht leben können. Herder Verlag, Freiburg/Basel/Wien 2005, ISBN 3-451-28608-4
- Heribert Prantl, Nina von Hardenberg [pub.]: Schwarz Rot Grau. Altern in Deutschland. München 2008, ISBN 978-3-86615-616-6
- Der Terrorist als Gesetzgeber. Wie man mit Angst Politik macht. Droemer/Knaur 2008, ISBN 978-3-426-27464-4
- Heribert Prantl, Robert Probst: Einigkeit und Recht und Wohlstand: Wie Deutschland wurde, was es ist. 60 Jahre Bundesrepublik Süddeutsche Zeitung/Bibliothek; Juli 2009, ISBN 978-3-86615-727-9
- Heribert Prantl:Der Zorn Gottes – Denkanstöße zu den Feiertagen. Süddeutsche Zeitung Edition, München 2011, ISBN 978-3-86615-888-7
- Heribert Prantl:Wir sind viele: Eine Anklage gegen den Finanzkapitalismus. Süddeutsche Zeitung Edition, München 2011, ISBN 978-3-86615-999-0
- Heribert Prantl:Alt.Amen.Anfang. – Neue Denkanstöße. Süddeutsche Zeitung Edition, München 2013, ISBN 978-3-86497-167-9
- Heribert Prantl:Glanz und Elend der Grundrechte. Zwölf Sterne für das Grundgesetz. Droemer, München 2014, ISBN 978-3-426-27650-1
- Heribert Prantl:Im Namen der Menschlichkeit – Rettet die Flüchtlinge. Ullstein, Berlin 2015, ISBN 978-3-550-08126-2
- Heribert Prantl: Trotz alledem! Europa muss man einfach lieben. Suhrkamp Verlag, Berlin 2016, ISBN 978-3-518-07289-9
- Heribert Prantl:Was ein einzelner vermag. Politische Zeitgeschichten. Süddeutsche Zeitung Edition, München 2016, ISBN 978-3-86497-352-9
- Heribert Prantl:Gebrauchsanweisung für Populisten. Wie man dem neuen Extremismus das Wasser abgräbt. Ecowin, Salzburg 2017, ISBN 978-3-7110-0130-6
- Heribert Prantl:Die Kraft der Hoffnung. Denkanstöße in schwierigen Zeiten. Süddeutsche Zeitung Edition, München 2017, ISBN 978-3-86497-423-6
- Heribert Prantl:Eigentum verpflichtet. Das unerfüllte Grundgesetz. Süddeutsche Zeitung Edition, München 2019, ISBN 978-3-86497-522-6
- Heribert Prantl:Not und Gebot. Grundrechte in Quarantäne. C. H. Beck, München 2021, ISBN 978-3-406-76895-8
- Heribert Prantl: Den Frieden gewinnen; Heyne Verlag; 17 April 2024, ISBN 978-3-453-21870-3
