= Hostile Takeover: How Islam Impedes Progress and Threatens Society =

2018 book of Thilo Sarrazin

First edition (German)

Feindliche Übernahme: Wie der Islam den Fortschritt behindert und die Gesellschaft bedroht (Hostile Takeover: How Islam Impedes Progress and Threatens Society) is a book written by the German politician Thilo Sarrazin of the Social Democratic Party of Germany. On 30 August 2018 it was published by the Finanzbuch Verlag, a member of the Münchener Verlagsgruppe GmbH and made it to #1 of the "Spiegel bestseller list", which lists the best-selling books in Germany per week.

== Background ==
Thilo Sarrazin's best-known book Deutschland schafft sich ab: Wie wir unser Land aufs Spiel setzen (translated as: "Germany abolishes itself: How we are putting our country at a risk"), in which he criticizes Islam and migration, was published in 2010. Upon publication, the book was immediately condemned by Angela Merkel and members of her government as "discriminatory". The Bundesbank, for whom Sarrazin worked, distanced itself from the author, saying that his remarks violated the bank's code of conduct and were harmful to its reputation.

In 2010, the Turkish-German writer and sociologist Necla Kelek, who accompanied Sarrazin at the launch, said that Sarrazin was "doing Germany a service" and that she shared his concerns about the future of the country. "[He] is calling on us Muslims to reflect on the role we play in Germany," she said. "To accuse him of racism is absurd, because Islam is not a race, but a culture and a religion."

== Reception ==
=== Launch ===
The launch of Sarrazin's new book was given police protection. Heinz Buschkowsky, a former SPD politician, stated that he does not agree with every thesis in the book, but, from his experience as former district mayor of Neukölln, Berlin, he shared Sarrazin's views. Kevin Kühnert, chairman of the SPD's Young Socialists' group Jusos, demanded new party procedures to allow Sarrazin's exclusion, and the SPD leadership distanced itself from him.

=== Critical reception ===
A first detailed review of this book, in which she accuses Sarrazin of many factual errors, was published on the day of publication by the Freiburg scholar Johanna Pink in Die Zeit.

Ulrich von Schwerin described Sarrazin's question in the Stuttgarter Zeitung as legitimate, but his results as a "distorted image". Von Schwerin says that of Sarrazin that:

"His whole book shows that he is not concerned with helping shape peaceful coexistence, but rather with the strict separation of peoples and stopping the immigration of Muslims.

Sonja Zekri, wrote in Tages Anzeiger that "For him (Sarrazin), Islam is not a faith, exposed to the stream of history and changeable, but a fate, a genetic defect that leads to intolerance and below average educational achievements," adding that "Germany needs this book as much as an Ebola outbreak, and yet success is inevitable."

=== Lawsuit against his former publisher ===
Several bestsellers authored by Thilo Sarrazin have been published by the Deutsche Verlags-Anstalt, a member of the Random House group. They declined to publish his 2018 book, claiming that he had rejected proofreading of his work by an expert, a claim the publisher had to take back in court, after Sarrazin had proven it to be a falsehood. Sarrazin filed a lawsuit over 800,000 Euro claiming defamation.
