= Carolin Emcke =

German author and journalist (born 1967)

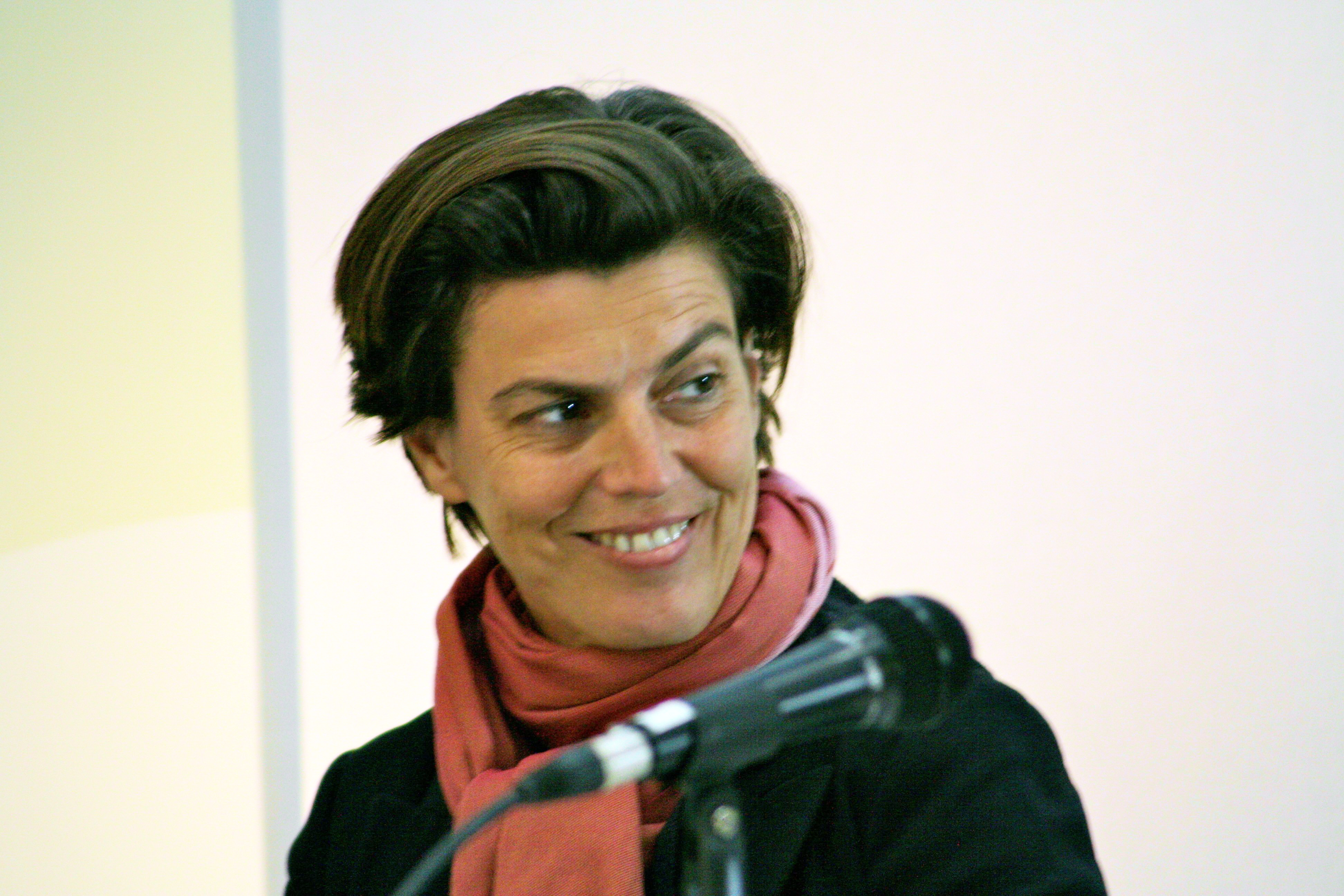
- Emcke at the Leipzig Book Fair in 2012
- Born: 18 August 1967 (age 58); Mülheim an der Ruhr, West Germany (now Germany)
- Education: Frankfurt University; London School of Economics; Harvard University
- Occupations: Journalist; Author
- Organizations: Der Spiegel; Yale University
- Awards: Das politische Buch; Johann-Heinrich-Merck-Preis; Friedenspreis des Deutschen Buchhandels

Carolin Emcke (born 18 August 1967) is a German author and journalist who worked for Der Spiegel from 1998 to 2006, often writing from areas of conflicts. From 2007 to 2014, she worked as an international reporter for Die Zeit. Her book Echoes of Violence – Letters from a War Reporter was published in 2007 at Princeton University Press. In 2008, she published Stumme Gewalt ("Mute force"), in 2013 How We Desire (German: Wie wir begehren), in 2016 Against Hate (German: Gegen den Hass), and in 2019 Yes means yes and... (Ja heißt ja und...). Carolin Emcke was honoured with several awards such as the Friedenspreis des Deutschen Buchhandels in 2016, and a Verdienstorden der Bundesrepublik Deutschland ("Federal Cross of Merit") in 2017.

== Early life and education ==
Carolin Emcke was born in Mülheim an der Ruhr, North Rhine-Westphalia, the daughter of an Argentinian mother and a German father. She received her Abitur in 1986. She studied philosophy, political science, and history in Frankfurt am Main, at the London School of Economics, and at Harvard University.

== Career ==
Emcke received her Ph.D. at Frankfurt under the supervision of Axel Honneth with a thesis on collective identities. From 1998 to 2006 she worked for Der Spiegel, often reporting from conflict areas such as Afghanistan, Colombia, Gaza, Iraq, Lebanon, and Pakistan. In 2003/04 she was a lecturer in Political Theory at Yale University. From 2007 to 2014 she was a writer and international reporter for DIE ZEIT (incl. in Israel, West Bank, Pakistan, Egypt, Iraq, Haiti, US).

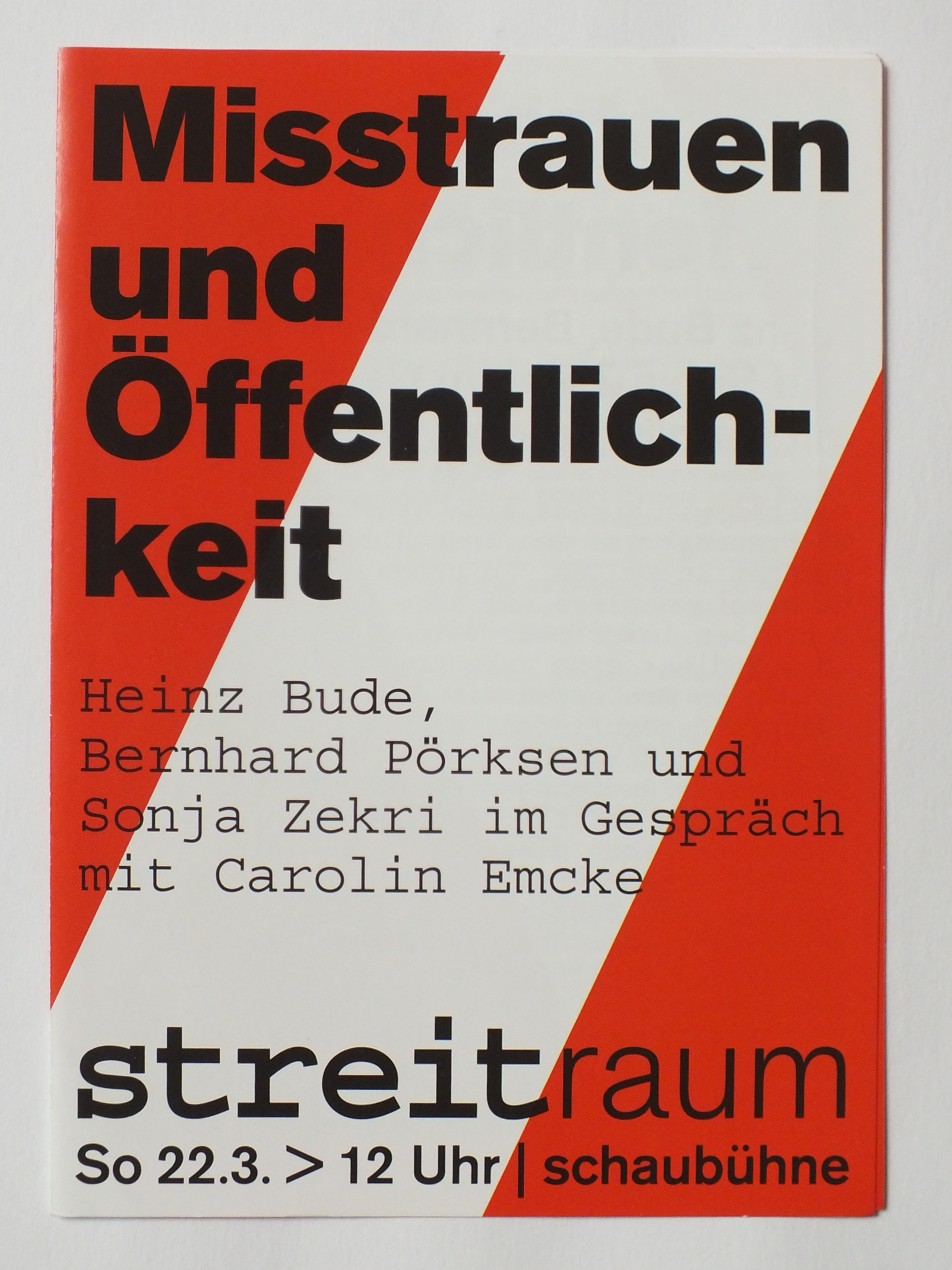
Flyer for Streitraum, a discussion with Heinz Bude, Bernhard Pörksen, and Sonja Zekri on Mistrust and Publicity

Since 2004 Emcke has moderated a monthly discussion series titled Streitraum at the Schaubühne theatre in Berlin. In 2006 and 2007 she worked as an advisor to the Hamburg Media School. Since 2014, she has been working as a freelance-writer and columnist for Süddeutsche Zeitung and El País. She has served on the jury of the Bavarian Book Prize.

Emcke has held seminars and lectures on topics such as globalisation, theories of violence, and cultural identity. In 2008 she published Stumme Gewalt: Nachdenken über die RAF ("Mute force: reflections on the Red Army Faction"), a memorial to her godfather, Alfred Herrhausen, who was murdered by the Red Army Faction on 30 November 1989. The work is aimed at encouraging dialogue between groups in societies, without violence, revenge, and disrespect. Emcke received the Theodor Wolff Prize for the book.

In her 2013 book, How We Desire, Emcke writes about a homosexual coming of age in the 1980s. In January 2014, she conducted an interview with German football player Thomas Hitzlsperger about his coming out for Die Zeit.

In her essay Against Hate (2016), Carolin Emcke speaks out on racism, fanaticism, and anti-Democratic forces. The book was published in various languages. In her book Yes means yes, and... (2019) she explores, in the wake of #MeToo, how we should think and talk about desire and power, exploitation and racism.

Emcke gave the opening speech at the 2016 Ruhrtriennale, on the topic of translation. She was awarded the Friedenspreis des Deutschen Buchhandels on 23 October 2016 at the Paulskirche, with a laudation by Seyla Benhabib.

After International Women's Day in 2019, The Guardian featured her together with three other feminists.

== Other activities ==
- Member of the Board of Trustees, Ernst Reuter Foundation for Advanced Study.
- Member of the Senate, Leibniz Association.
- Member of the Board of Trustees, Gerda Henkel Foundation (since 2018)
- Member of the General Assembly, Heinrich Böll Foundation

== Awards ==
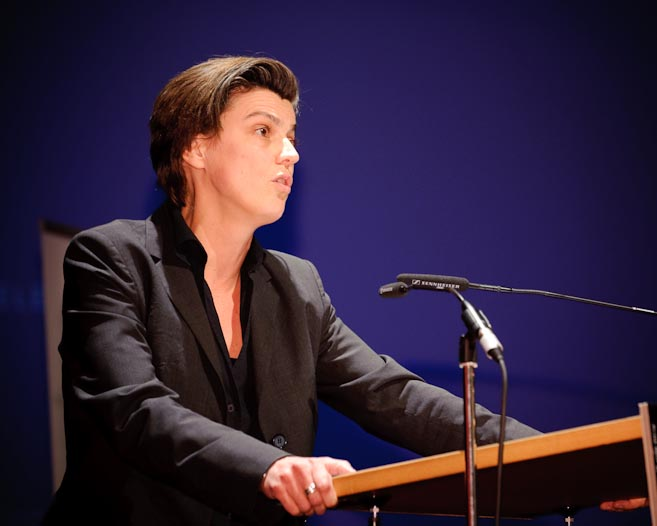
Emcke in 2010

- 2005: Political Book Prize of the Friedrich Ebert Foundation
- 2006: Advancement award of the Ernst-Bloch-Preis
- 2008: Theodor Wolff Prize
- 2010: Otto Brenner Prize for critical journalism
- 2010: "Journalist of the Year" 2010, Medium Magazin
- 2014: Johann Heinrich Merck Prize
- 2015: Lessing Prize of the Free State of Saxony
- 2016: Friedenspreis des Deutschen Buchhandels

== Selected works ==
- Kollektive Identitäten: Sozialphilosophische Grundlagen. Campus, Frankfurt am Main / New York, NY 2000, ISBN 3-593-36484-0 (Dissertation Universität Frankfurt 1998, 360 Seiten); 2nd ed. 2010, ISBN 978-3-593-39222-6.
- Von den Kriegen: Briefe an Freunde [From the Wars: Letters to Friends] (in German), Frankfurt am Main: Fischer, 2004, ISBN 3-10-017013-X (The original letters were translated from English by Sebastian Vogel and revised for printing by the author.)
- Echoes of Violence: Letters from a War Reporter, Princeton / Oxford: Princeton University Press, 2007, ISBN 978-0-691-12903-7
- Stumme Gewalt: Nachdenken über die RAF. S. Fischer, Frankfurt am Main 2008, ISBN 978-3-10-017017-0 (with contributions by Winfried Hassemer and Wolfgang Kraushaar).
- How We Desire. Trans. Imogen Taylor. Text, Melbourne 2018. (Original: Wie wir begehren. S. Fischer, Frankfurt am Main 2012, ISBN 978-3-10-017018-7.)
- Weil es sagbar ist: Über Zeugenschaft und Gerechtigkeit. S. Fischer, Frankfurt am Main 2013, ISBN 978-3-10-017019-4.
- Against Hate. Trans. Tony Crawford. Polity, Cambridge 2019. (Original: Gegen den Hass. Essay. S. Fischer, Frankfurt am Main 2016, ISBN 978-3-10-397231-3.)
- Ja heißt ja und ... ein Monolog (in German). Frankfurt am Main: S. Fischer. 2019. ISBN 978-3-10-397462-1. OCLC 1078158754.
- Journal: Tagebuch in Zeiten der Pandemie (in German). Frankfurt am Main: S. Fischer. 2021. ISBN 978-3-10-397094-4. OCLC 1202079649.
