= Erich Fromm Prize =

The Erich Fromm Prize (German: Erich-Fromm-Preis) is a German prize bestowed upon people who have advanced Humanism through their scientific, social, sociopolitical or journalistic engagement. The prize is named after Erich Fromm, a Jewish German-American philosopher, psychoanalyst and psychologist. The prize is conferred yearly since 1995, and since 2006, it is endowed with 10,000 €.

The Erich Fromm Society (Erich-Fromm-Gesellschaft) elects a five-person jury, which decides on the prize winner. Its decision is made by simple majority and is not influenced by the Society, but it has to respect applications and recommendations.

== Recipients ==
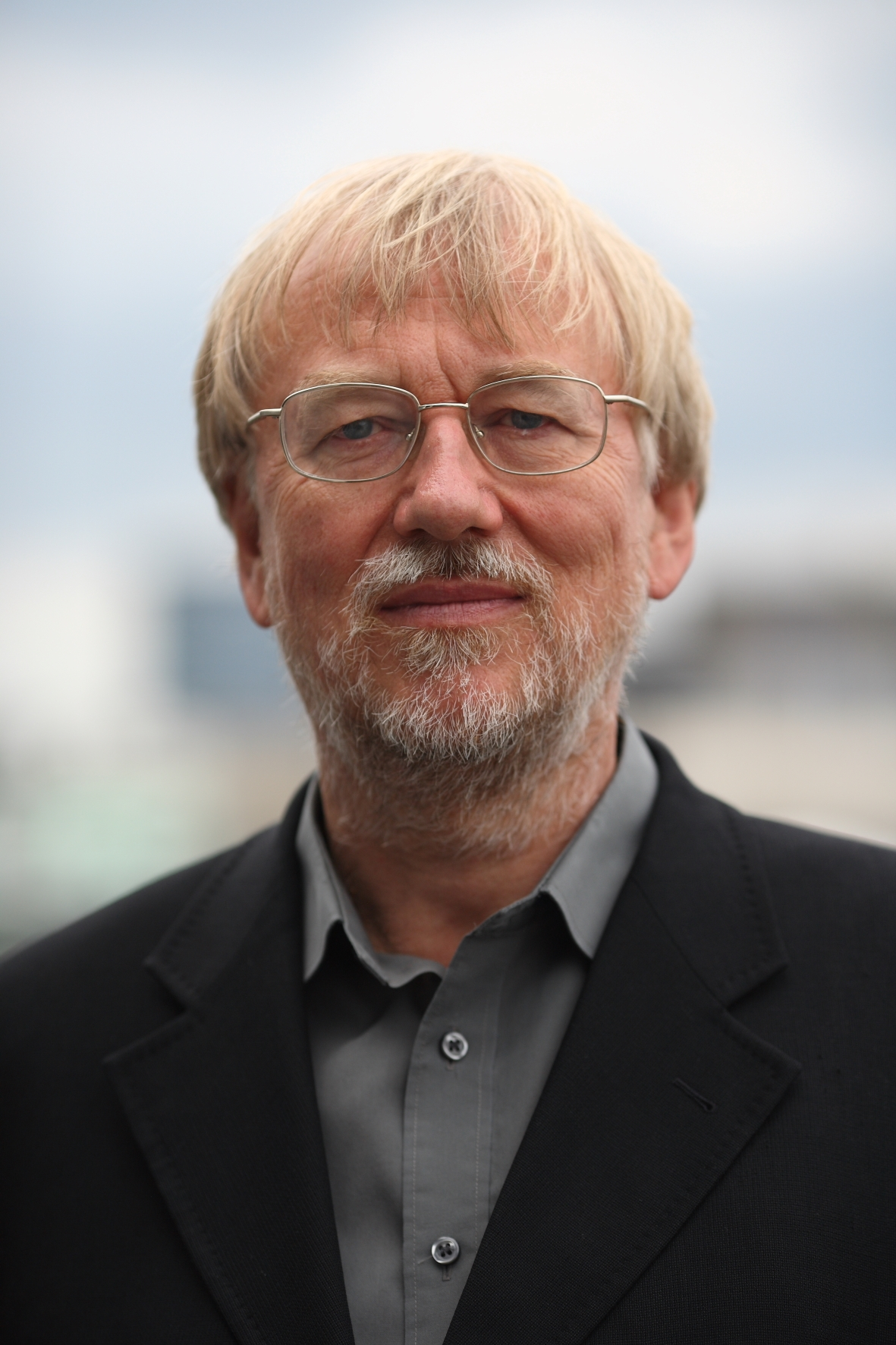
World Future Council Founder Jakob von Uexkull, recipient 2008

- 1995
  - Duchovný Parliament, Bratislava
- 1996
  - Sociopsychoanalytical Seminary of the University of Mexiko-City
  - University of Wrocław, Poland
  - Germanistic Division of the University of Pécs, Hungary
- 1997: No prize winner
- 1998
  - Rainer J. Kaus
  - Svante Lundgren
  - Martina Parge
- 1999
  - Jan M. Böhm
  - Claudia Hoock
- 2000
  - Kevin Anderson
  - Richard Quinney
  - Bruno Osuch
- 2001
  - Gerd Meyer
- 2002–2003: No prize winners
- 2004 William Wasson, Hamid Lechhab
- 2005: No prize winner
- 2006 Hans Leyendecker, Heribert Prantl
- 2007 Eugen Drewermann, Konstantin Wecker
- 2008 Jakob von Uexküll
- 2009 Gerhart Baum
- 2010 Noam Chomsky
- 2011 Anne-Sophie Mutter
- 2012 Georg Schramm
- 2013 Gesine Schwan
- 2015 Götz Werner
- 2016 Christel und Rupert Neudeck
- 2017 John Neumeier
- 2018 Hartmut Rosa
- 2019 Daniel and Sabine Röder and Pulse of Europe
- 2020 Paul Mason
- 2021 Maja Göpel
- 2022 Ueli Mäder
- 2023 Thomas Fuchs
- 2024 Bernhard Pörksen
- 2025 Hito Steyerl
- 2026 Klaus M. Leisinger
