= Thilo Sarrazin =

German politician and writer (born 1945)

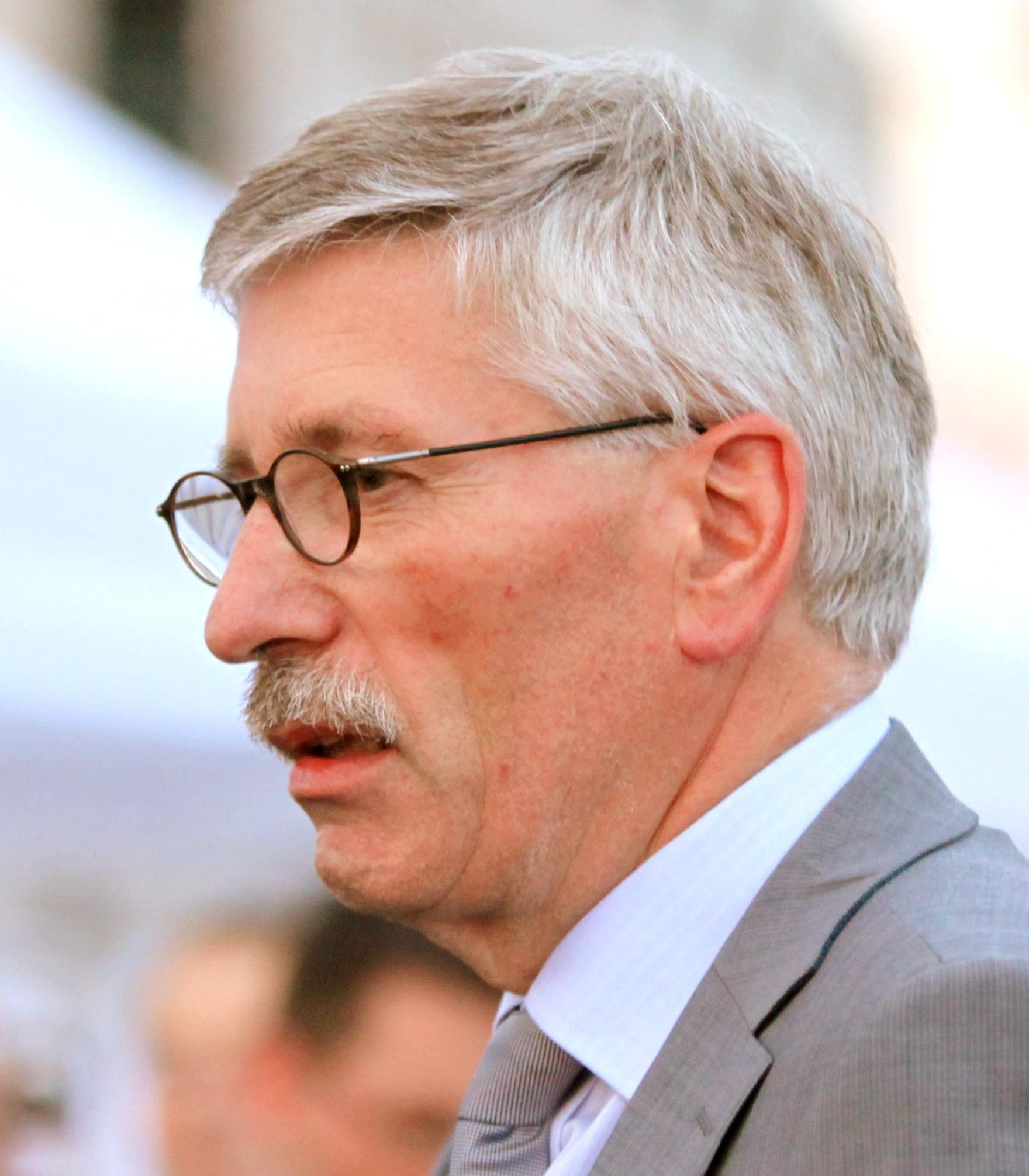
- Sarrazin in 2009

Senator for Finance of Berlin
- In office 17 January 2002 – 30 April 2009
- Preceded by: Christiane Krajewski
- Succeeded by: Ulrich Nußbaum

Personal details
- Born: 12 February 1945 (age 81) Gera, Thuringia, German Reich
- Party: SPD (until 2020)
- Spouse: Ursula (née Breit)
- Education: University of Bonn
- Profession: Economist, politician, writer

Thilo Sarrazin (born 12 February 1945) is a German former politician, economist and author. A longtime SPD civil servant, Sarrazin was Berlin's appointed Senator for Finance from 2002 to 2009. He rose to greater prominence in 2010, when he published Deutschland schafft sich ab (Germany Abolishes Itself), a critique of Germany's post-war immigration policy and multiculturalism. The book was an unexpected bestseller, but was condemned by the SPD, which succeeded in expelling him in 2020, after a drawn-out legal battle. Since the release of Germany Abolishes Itself, Sarrazin has written several books concerning immigration and politics.

== Life ==
=== Early life and education ===
Sarrazin was born in Gera, Germany. His father was a doctor and his mother was the daughter of a West Prussian landowner. His paternal ancestors were French Huguenots who originated in Burgundy, while his grandmother was English and another ancestor was Italian. He has explained that his name means Saracen (i.e. Muslim) and is common in Southern France: "It is derived from the Arab pirates that were called 'Saracens' in the Middle Ages". He has referred to himself as "a European mongrel".

He grew up in Recklinghausen where he graduated from the local gymnasium after which he did his military service. From 1967 to 1971, he studied economics at the University of Bonn, earning his doctorate. From November 1973 to December 1974 he worked for the Friedrich Ebert Foundation and became active in the SPD.

=== Career as civil servant ===
In 1975 Sarrazin began working in the Federal Ministry of Finance. Until 1981 he served as a department head in the Ministry of Labour and Social Affairs and from 1981 he returned to the Federal Ministry of Finance. From October 1981 he served as bureau chief and was a close collaborator of Federal Finance Minister Hans Matthöfer and his successor Manfred Lahnstein. Even after the end of the socialist-liberal coalition in October 1982, Sarrazin remained in the Finance Ministry, where he was director of several units, including (from 1989 to 1990) the "Innerdeutsche Beziehungen," which prepared the German monetary, economic and social union. During his time as Head of the Federal Ministry of Finance, he was partly responsible for German railways.

From 1990 to 1991 Sarrazin worked for the Treuhand. Up to 1997, he was State Secretary in the Ministry of Finance in Rhineland-Palatinate. Subsequently, he was chief executive of TLG Immobilien (TLG).

=== Deutsche Bahn ===
Between spring 2000 and December 2001 he was employed by the Deutsche Bahn, the German national railway. During his first four months he served as head of internal auditing; from 1 September 2000 he was on the board of DB Netz, responsible for planning and investment.

Sarrazin is considered a key developer of the people's share model of the German railway, which provides for the issue of non-voting preferred stock to limit the influence of private investors. He claims to have made this proposal to thwart the model of capital privatization of Deutsche Bahn. He is regarded as an explicit supporter of orienting the Deutsche Bahn on the principles of efficiency under a cost-effectiveness analysis. His relationship with the former CEO of Deutsche Bahn AG, Hartmut Mehdorn, is characterized as hostile.

Sarrazin's dismissal from the board of DB Netz AG was followed by legal disputes. He drew his salary for a transitional period during which the details of the separation procedures were regulated. According to Hartmut Mehdorn, Sarrazin broke his contract with the company, which stated that secondary activities are not allowed. The employment contract was subsequently terminated without notice by the DB. Sarrazin sued, but the case was dismissed by the Federal Court.

=== Finance Senator ===
Sarrazin was appointed Finance Senator to the Senate of Berlin in January 2002. He adhered to financial policy based on strict savings and a single-entry bookkeeping system for the management of local authorities.

As a result of his remarks on Berlin's social and educational reputation some consider Sarrazin being an agitator. His proposals for cutting social benefits were often accompanied by protests. In 2008 he made suggestions, such as that a beneficiary of ALG II could eat for less than €4 per day. In 2009 he said of unemployed persons' management of energy: "First, Hartz IV receivers are more at home, second, they like it warm, and thirdly, many regulate the temperature with the window," in light of the fact that in Germany, the unemployed do not pay for rent and heating themselves. Sarrazin called pension increases "completely senseless action", but instead recommended that the government prepare older citizens for a "long term decline to the level of subsistence."

In the political controversy surrounding the Berlin event center Tempodrom he was accused of having awarded state funds irregularly. The preliminary investigation was also against two other SPD-CDU politicians, three companies and two accountants. The investigating prosecutor filed an informal appeal against Sarrazin, but in December 2004 the Berlin district court rejected a trial because the prosecution was seen as ineffective.

In August 2009, Berlin's public prosecutor conducted an investigation of Sarrazin for embezzlement. According to the office of the prosecutor, he favored the Berlin-Wannsee Golf and Country Club, leasing a golf course to them at a reduced rate. Sarrazin dismissed the accusations on the grounds that he saw no financial loss for the city.

=== Deutsche Bundesbank ===
On April 30, 2009, Sarrazin resigned from his position as senator as he was appointed to join the executive board of the Bundesbank. From May 1, 2010 until September 1, 2010, his responsibilities at the Bundesbank included information technology, risk monitoring and review. On September 2, 2010, he was released from specific responsibilities in a move by the other board members to have him removed as executive board member following a controversial statement made by Sarrazin about Jewish genetics. Whether Sarrazin should keep his job at the Bundesbank or be dismissed was to be reviewed by then Federal President Christian Wulff. However, on September 9, 2010, Sarrazin asked the President to relieve him of his duties as a board member.

=== Party membership ===
The party leadership of the Social Democratic Party (SPD) announced in August 2010 that it would investigate whether to terminate Sarrazin's membership, because his theses could be understood as diametrically opposed to basic social-democratic values. An arbitration committee, meeting in Berlin on 21 April 2011, decided that Sarrazin could remain a member of the party. The formal accusation that he had damaged the party with his theories could not be upheld, in particular because Sarrazin read a statement in which he said he had never intended to depart from social democratic values and that he had never intended to suggest that social-Darwinist theories should be implemented in political practice. This in turn led to dissatisfaction among many SPD party leaders. The SPD opened a third proceeding in order to revoke Sarrazin's membership after he published his book Hostile Takeover: How Islam Impedes Progress and Threatens Society. The arbitration committee of the concerned SPD district chapter, Berlin Charlottenburg-Wilmersdorf, accepted the motion of the SPD leadership. Sarrazin and his lawyers stated that they did not accept and sought to appeal the decision.

== Personal life ==
Sarrazin is married to Ursula Sarrazin (née Breit) and has two sons. His apparent characteristic smirk is due to an operation he had in 2004 to remove a tumour on an inner ear nerve, resulting in an impairment of the right side of his face.

== Views ==
=== Immigration, Islam and social welfare ===
Book cover

Sarrazin advocates a restrictive immigration policy with the exception of the highly skilled and the reduction of state welfare benefits. In September 2009, his views on economic and immigration policy in Berlin were published in Lettre International, a German cultural quarterly, and caused severe reactions. In it he described many Arab and Turkish immigrants as unwilling to integrate. He said, among other things:

Integration requires effort from those that are to be integrated. I will not show respect for anyone who is not making that effort. I do not have to acknowledge anyone who lives by welfare, denies the legitimacy of the very state that provides that welfare, refuses to care for the education of his children and constantly produces new little headscarf-girls. This holds true for 70 percent of the Turkish and 90 percent of the Arab population in Berlin.

End of August 2010, Sarrazin's book Deutschland schafft sich ab (Germany Abolishes Itself) was published, and within two months, it became the best-selling book on politics by a German-language author in a decade, with overall sales hitting 1.1 million copies. The first edition of his book sold out within a few days. By the end of the year, the book had become Germany's number 1 hard-cover non-fiction bestseller for the year and was still at the top of the lists. In the 13th edition Sarrazin added a foreword commenting on the nationwide debate his book has sparked. As of May 2011, 1.5 million copies had been sold. In 2010, he was quoted as writing regarding Islam, "No other religion in Europe makes so many demands. No immigrant group other than Muslims is so strongly connected with claims on the welfare state and crime. No group emphasizes their differences so strongly in public, especially through women's clothing. In no other religion is the transition to violence, dictatorship and terrorism so fluid."

In 2010, Sarrazin's book came under criticism for claiming that Germany's immigrant Muslim population is reluctant to integrate and tends to rely more on social services than to be productive. Moreover, he calculated that their population growth may well overwhelm the German population within a couple of generations at the current rate, and that their intelligence was lower. He proposed stringent reforms for the welfare system to rectify the problems.

In an interview with Die Zeit in 2026, Sarrazin declined to state for whom, if anyone, he would vote for in the next federal election. Sarrazin bemoaned conspiracy theories and the "völkisch wing" of Alternative for Germany (AfD), as represented by Björn Höcke, but implied openness to "conservative", pro-NATO factions within AfD. In the same interview, he furthered previous statements regarding immigrants and Islam, stating that women who wear hijab "separate themselves from majority society (Mehrheitsgesellschaft)". Sarrazin evaluated the impacts of Germany Abolishes Itself in public discourse positively, stating that it ignited necessary conversations.

=== Genetics ===
In 2010, an uproar was caused at an interview with Welt am Sonntag in which he claimed that "all Jews share a certain gene like all Basques share a certain gene that distinguishes these from other people." He subsequently offered his regrets for the irritation caused, and explained his source, for instance, in the Frankfurter Allgemeine Zeitung, referring to international media reports, on a 2010 study by Gil Atzmon et al. that appeared in the American Journal of Human Genetics. Sarrazin secured an apology from the Frankfurter Allgemeine after Frank Schirrmacher accused him of eugenic viewpoints, which he disputed.

In 2018, Sarrazin's statements were criticized by the chairman of the Interior Committee of the German Bundestag, Sebastian Edathy (SPD), the United Services trade union and the political scientist Gerd Wiegel. The Central Council of Jews in Germany strongly criticized Sarrazin, condemning him as racist. Sigmar Gabriel, the General Secretary of the SPD, condemned Sarrazin for his eugenic approach.

In his 2026 Zeit interview, Sarrazin reiterated his adherence to hereditarian positions, claiming that immigration was causing a "catastrophe" in the German education system.

== Reception ==
A Berliner Morgenpost poll suggested that almost half of the German population agree with Sarrazin's political views and 18 percent would vote for his party if he started one. In a survey conducted for the Süddeutsche Zeitung newspaper among 10,000 Sarrazin readers, an overwhelming majority was shown to be male, middle-class, middle-aged to elderly, conservatives.

The German-Turkish sociologist and best-selling author Necla Kelek, who has defended Sarrazin, introduced him at a Berlin press conference in August 2010 attended by roughly 300 journalists. While Turkish and Islamic organizations have accused Sarrazin of racism and damaging Germany's reputation abroad, Kelek said Sarrazin addressed "bitter truths" in his book and the chattering classes judged it without reading it.

== The new terror of virtue ==
The publication of his book "Deutschland schafft sich ab" provoked accusations that Sarrazin was stoking racism and xenophobia. This harsh criticism inspired Sarrazin to write Der neue Tugendterror - Über die Grenzen der Meinungsfreiheit in Deutschland (The new terror of virtue - on the limits of freedom of opinion in Germany) on the topics of the mechanics of political correctness, prejudice and the political climate in Germany, as he explains in the second chapter of this book, titled "Wie ich mit der Meinungsherrschaft in Konflikt kam: Eine Fallstudie" ("How I got into conflict with the rule of opinion: a case study"). "I had expected a controversial discussion. But nothing had prepared me for the public storm that broke loose upon publication. I was accused of advocating biological determinism and labelled a social Darwinist, a racist, and an enemy of the people and of social justice."

== Selected works ==
- Deutschland schafft sich ab, translated as Germany Is Doing Away with Itself (2010)
- Europa braucht den Euro nicht, translated as Europe doesn't need the euro (2012)
- Der neue Tugendterror. Über die Grenzen der Meinungsfreiheit in Deutschland. Deutsche Verlags-Anstalt, München 2014, ISBN 978-3-421-04617-8
- Wunschdenken. Europa, Währung, Bildung, Einwanderung – warum Politik so häufig scheitert (2016)
- Feindliche Übernahme: Wie der Islam den Fortschritt behindert und die Gesellschaft bedroht ("Hostile takeover – how Islam impairs progress and threatens society") (2018)
