= Gerhart Baum =

German politician (1932–2025)

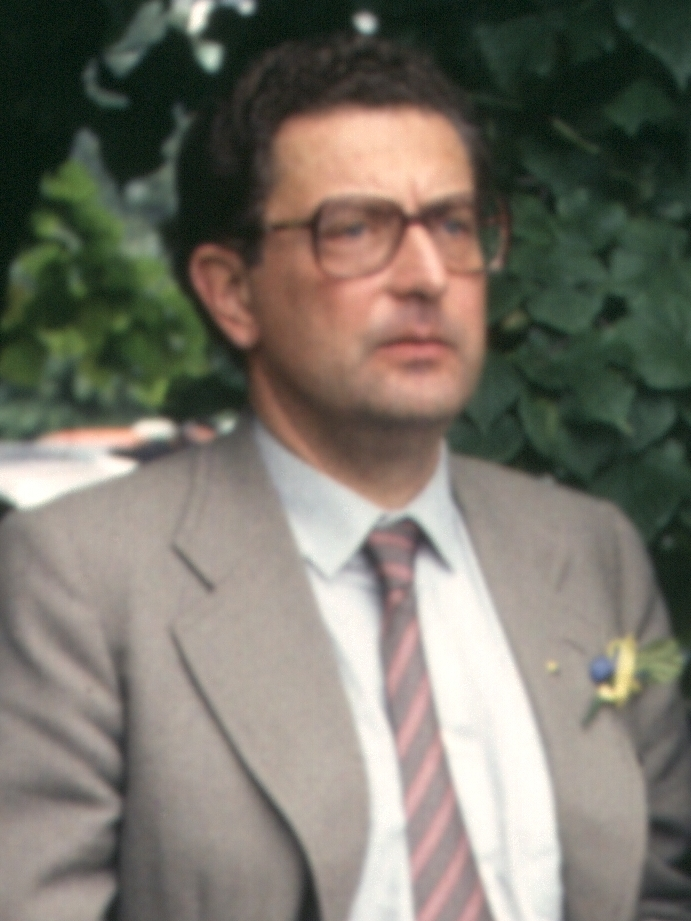
- Baum in 1980

Federal Minister of the Interior
- In office 8 June 1978 – 17 September 1982
- Chancellor: Helmut Schmidt
- Preceded by: Werner Maihofer
- Succeeded by: Jürgen Schmude

Parliamentary Secretary of State for the Interior
- In office 15 December 1972 – 8 June 1978
- Chancellor: Willy Brandt; Helmut Schmidt
- Preceded by: Wolfram Dorn
- Succeeded by: Andreas von Schoeler

Member of the Bundestag for North Rhine-Westphalia
- In office 19 November 1972 – 16 October 1994
- Constituency: FDP List

Personal details
- Born: 28 October 1932 Dresden, Saxony, Germany
- Died: 15 February 2025 (aged 92) Cologne, North Rhine-Westphalia, Germany
- Party: Free Democratic Party (FDP)
- Education: University of Cologne
- Profession: Lawyer
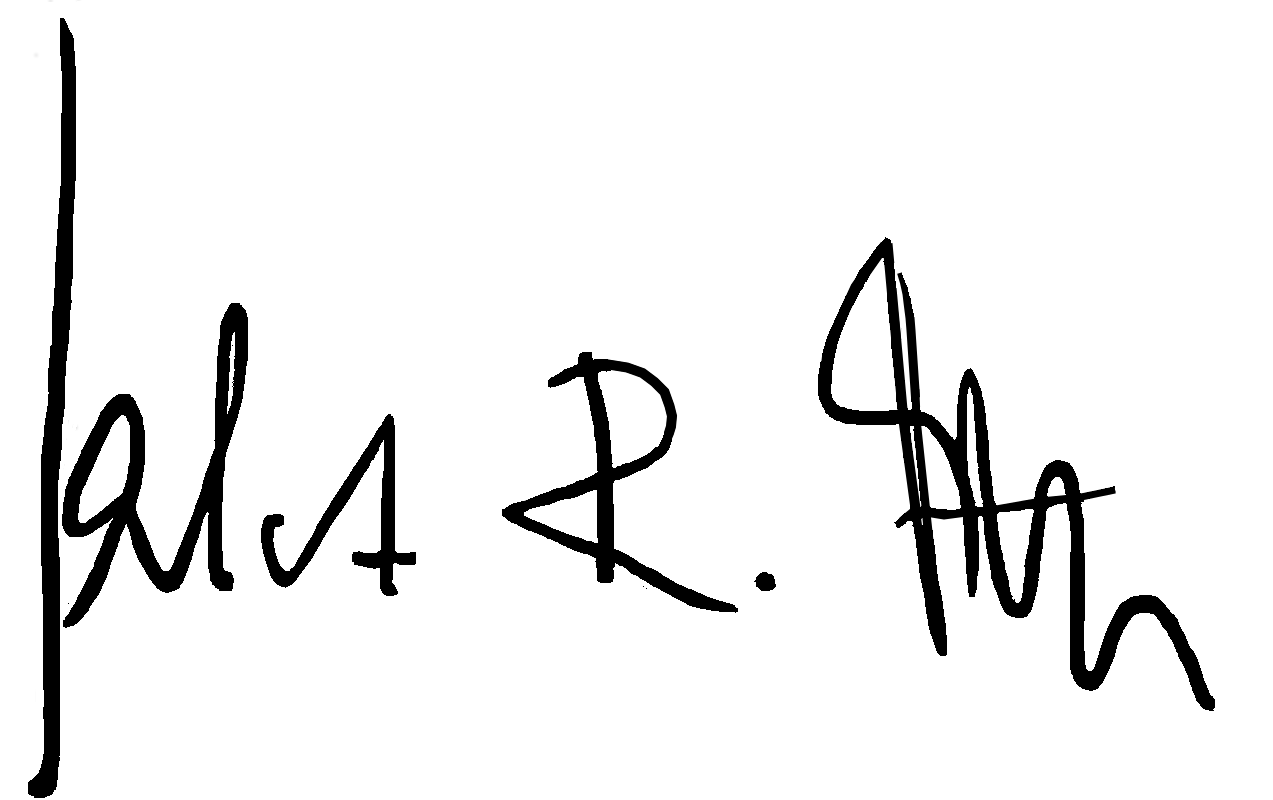
- Signature
- Website: www.baum-reiter.de/team/gerhart-baum

Gerhart Rudolf Baum (28 October 1932 – 15 February 2025) was a German politician of the Free Democratic Party (FDP) and a lawyer. From 1978 to 1982, he served as Federal Minister of the Interior of the Federal Republic of Germany.

== Early life and education ==
Gerhart Baum was born on 28 October 1932 in Dresden to a German father and a Russian mother. His paternal ancestors, whose roots lay in Plauen in the Saxon Vogtland, originally worked as craftsmen before later generations were able to pursue academic professions. His mother was born in Moscow; her own mother was from Łódź and of Polish ethnicity and her Ukrainian-born father was originally from Kharkiv. In 1917, her family had fled from Russia to Germany as a result of the October Revolution. In his childhood Baum was a forced member of the Hitler Youth. After the bombing of Dresden, his mother left the city in February 1945 and fled with her three children to Lake Tegernsee in Bavaria. His father, who had fought on the Eastern Front during the war, was captured by the Soviets and later died in captivity. In 1950, Baum's family moved to Cologne.

After graduating from school in 1953, Baum studied law at the University of Cologne and subsequently worked as a lawyer.

== Political career ==
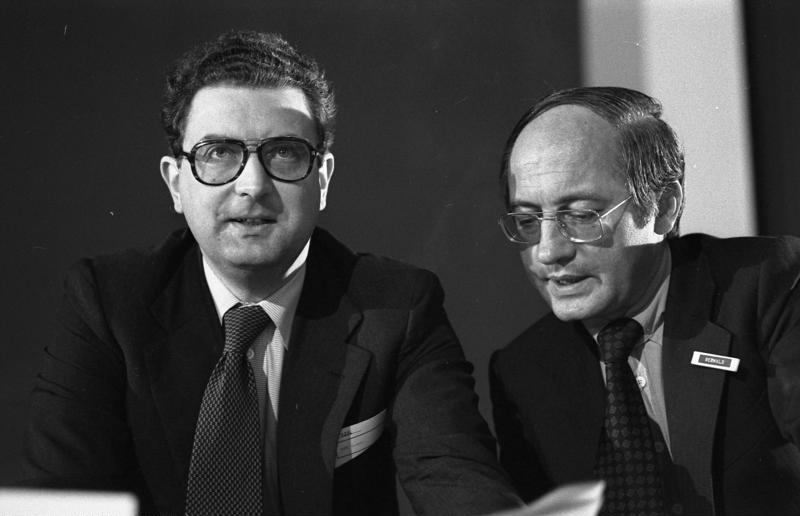
Baum (left) alongside Josef M. Gerwald in 1976

Baum was a member of the FDP from 1954 until his death.

From 1978 until 1982, Baum served as Federal Minister of the Interior in the government of Chancellor Helmut Schmidt. During his time in office, he liberalized routine loyalty investigations of candidates for public‐service jobs, a controversial practice intended to control radical activity that had led to a profound and disruptive debate about the extent of democracy in West Germany. In 1981, with the backing of economics minister Otto Graf Lambsdorff, he asked the German car industry to agree on goals to tighten emissions standards and cut fuel consumption on a voluntary basis.

Following the collapse of the social–liberal coalition, Baum – alongside fellow FDP ministers Hans-Dietrich Genscher, Lambsdorff, and Josef Ertl – stepped down on 17 September 1982.

== Life after politics ==
Between 2000 and 2001, Baum and two other lawyers together represented about three-quarters of the Air France Flight 4590 crash victims' families. In May 2001, they reached a monetary settlement for compensation from Air France. According to people familiar with terms of the settlement, it was between $100 million and $125 million (€114.1 million and €142.6 million), an extraordinarily high sum for a plane-crash settlement in Europe at the time.

From 2001 to 2003, Baum served as UN Special Rapporteur on the Situation of Human Rights in Sudan.

In 2006, Baum presented a press freedom award to Berliner Zeitung for its resistance to an unpopular takeover by David Montgomery’s Mecom Group.

In 2009, Germany's national railway company Deutsche Bahn commissioned Baum and former justice minister Herta Däubler-Gmelin with investigating allegations according to which the company had, in violation of privacy laws and corporate guidelines repeatedly and on a large scale compared personal data of its employees with those of suppliers, in a bid to uncover possible corruption.

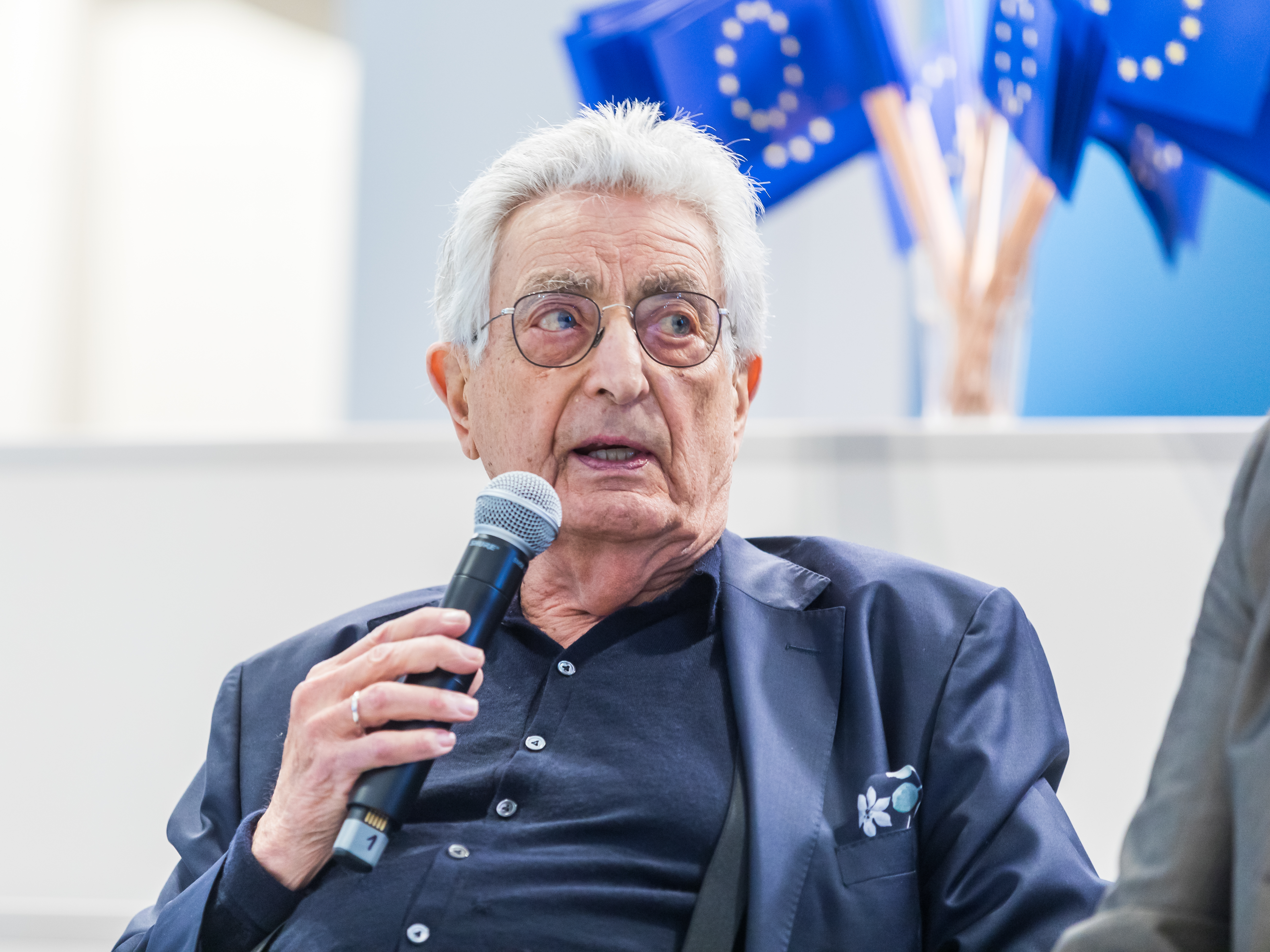
Baum in May 2024

In 2016, Baum joined members of the Green Party, lawyers, a journalist and a doctor in bringing suits against Germany's 2009 antiterrorism law before the Federal Constitutional Court, arguing that covert surveillance, particularly in private homes and in the intimacy of bedrooms or bathrooms, could entangle innocent third parties. In a 6-to-2 vote, the court ruled that the antiterrorism laws were partly unconstitutional and demanded tighter control over surveillance.

In 2022, shortly before the 50th anniversary of the 1972 Munich massacre, Dutch lawyers Carry and Alexander Knoops asked Baum to intervene in the negotiations between the victims’ families and the government of Chancellor Olaf Scholz, which eventually resulted in a compensation offer totalling €28 million ($28 million).

Baum died in Cologne on 15 February 2025, at the age of 92.

== Other activities ==
- Kunststiftung NRW, member of the board of trustees
- Stiftung Menschenrechte, member of the council
- Green Helmets, Member of the Board of Trustees
- Theodor Heuss Foundation, member of the board of trustees
- United Nations Association of Germany (DGVN), member of the presidium
- Stichting Volkswagen Car Claim, president of the advisory board

== Recognition ==
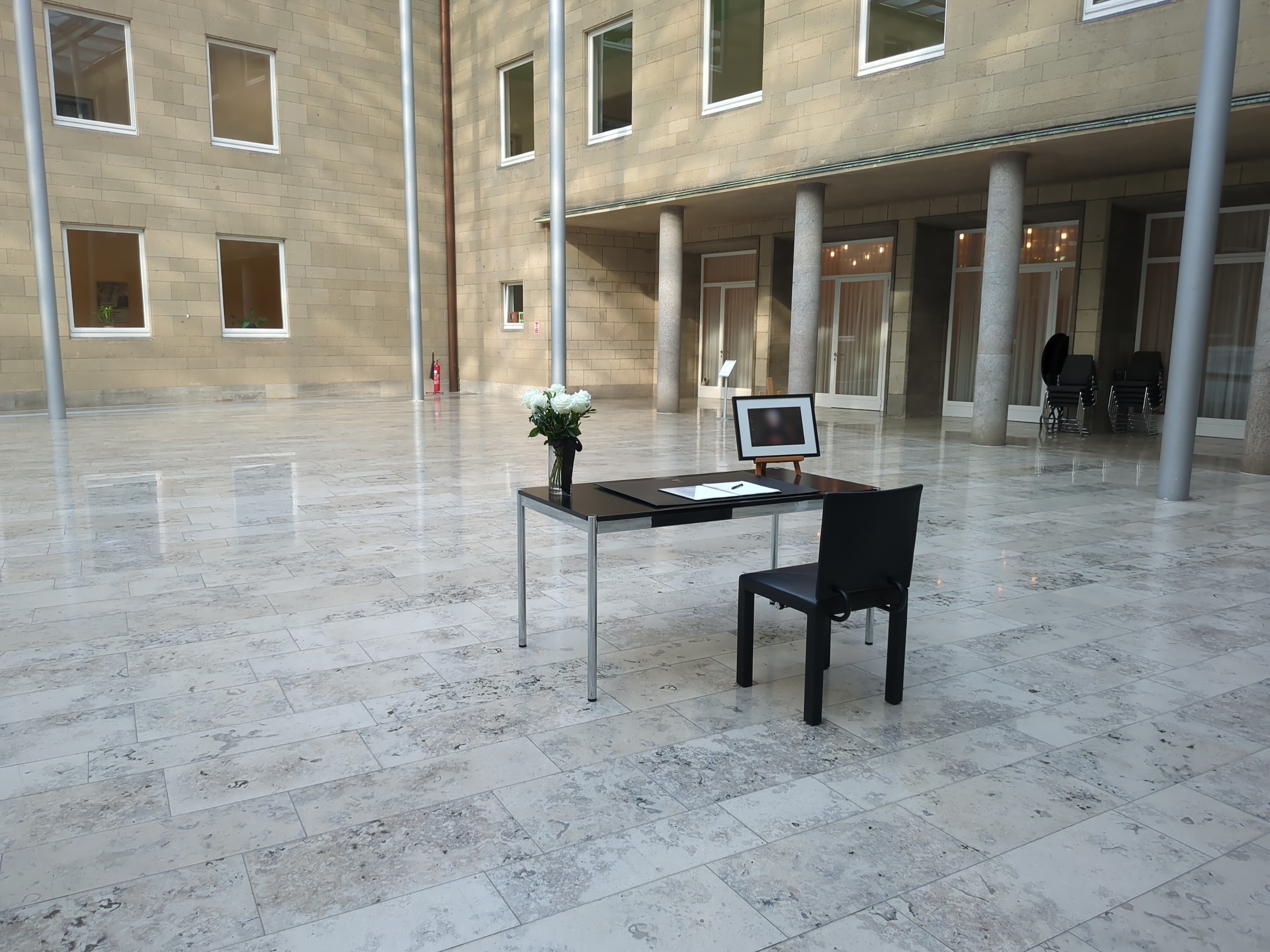
Rathaus Köln, Spanischer Bau, condolence book, February 2025

- 2009 Erich-Fromm-Preis
- 2017 Order of Merit of North Rhine-Westphalia
- 2023 Knight Commander's Cross of the Order of Merit of the Federal Republic of Germany
- 2024 Honorary doctorate University of Cologne

== Selected works ==
- "Die Finanzkrise und ihre Folgen für die Bevölkerung. Anforderungen an einen verbesserten Verbraucherschutz", in: Hecht, Janina; Robertson-von Trotha, Caroline Y., eds. (2011). Herausforderung Demokratie. Nomos Verlagsgesellschaft mbH & Co KG. doi:10.5771/9783845232539. ISBN 978-3-8452-3253-9.
- "Die Grundrechte im Spannungsverhältnis von Sicherheit und Freiheit", in: Robertson-von Trotha, Caroline Y., ed. (2009). 60 Jahre Grundgesetz. Nomos. doi:10.5771/9783845220345. ISBN 978-3-8452-2034-5.
