= Ulrich Nußbaum =

German lawyer and politician

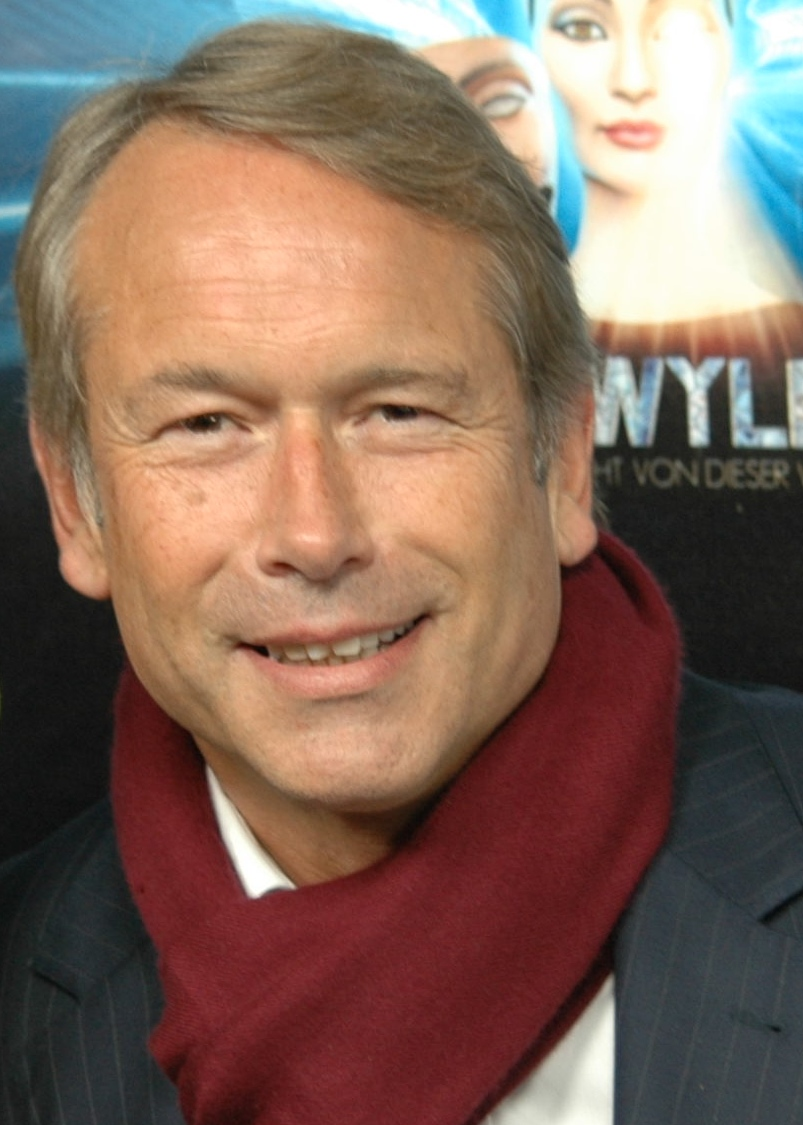

Berlin Senator of Finance
- Preceded by: Thilo Sarrazin
- Succeeded by: Matthias Kollatz-Ahnen

Personal details
- Born: 10 April 1957 (age 69)

Ulrich Nußbaum (born 10 April 1957) is a German lawyer and politician served as State Secretary at the Federal Ministry for Economic Affairs and Energy under the leadership of minister Peter Altmaier in the fourth coalition government of Chancellor Angela Merkel from 2018 to 2021.

== Early life and education ==
Nußbaum graduated from highschool in 1976 and subsequently studied law in Saarbrücken, Geneva, Strasbourg and London. He received his Ph.D. in 1984, with a thesis on raw material extraction in the Antarctic.

== Career ==
Since Nußbaum has been a licensed lawyer. From 1993 until 2003, he held teaching positions at the Saarland University. In addition, he served as vice president of the Chamber of Industry and Commerce (IHK) of Bremerhaven from 1996 until 2003 and from 2007 until 2009.

From 2003 until 2007, Nußbaum served as State Minister of Finance in the government of successive mayors Henning Scherf and Jens Böhrnsen of Bremen. He later served in the same capacity in the government of mayor Klaus Wowereit of Berlin from 2009 until 2014.

From 2015 until 2018, Nußbaum served as Chairman of the Board of the German Transport Forum (DVF).

== Other activities ==
=== Corporate boards ===
- KfW IPEX-Bank, Ex-Officio Member of the Supervisory Board (2017–2021)
- Germany Trade and Invest (GTAI), Ex-Officio Chairman of the Supervisory Board (2017–2021)
- KfW, Ex-Officio Member of the Board of Supervisory Directors (2013–2014)
- Berliner Stadtreinigung (BSR), Ex-Officio Member of the Supervisory Board (2009-2014)
- Berliner Verkehrsbetriebe (BVG), Ex-Officio Member of the Supervisory Board (2009-2014)
- Berliner Wasserbetriebe (BWB), Ex-Officio Member of the Supervisory Board (2009-2014)
- Vivantes, Ex-Officio Member of the Supervisory Board (2009-2014)
- Charité, Ex-Officio Member of the Supervisory Board (2009-2014)

=== Non-profit organizations ===
- Federal Agency for Disruptive Innovation (SPRIN-D), Member of the Supervisory Board (2020–2021)
- Helmholtz Association of German Research Centres, Ex-Officio Member of the Senate
- Leibniz Association, Ex-Officio Member of the Senate (since 2018)
