= Der neue Tugendterror =

2014 book by Thilo Sarrazin

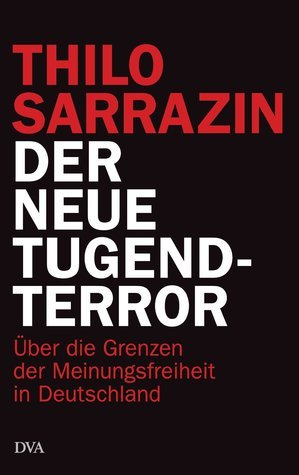
- Author: Thilo Sarrazin
- Language: German
- Subject: media bias
- Publisher: Deutsche Verlags-Anstalt
- Publication date: 2014
- Publication place: Germany
- Pages: 396
- ISBN: 978-3-421-04617-8

Der neue Tugendterror. Über die Grenzen der Meinungsfreiheit in Deutschland (lit. 'The New Virtue Terror: On the Limits of Freedom of Expression in Germany') is a 2014 book by the German writer Thilo Sarrazin. It combines media analysis and autobiography and criticises liberal and egalitarian conformity within German media.

The book was a bestseller in Germany, topping Der Spiegel's bestseller chart for two weeks.
