= Matthias Kollatz-Ahnen =

German politician (born 1957)

Matthias Kollatz
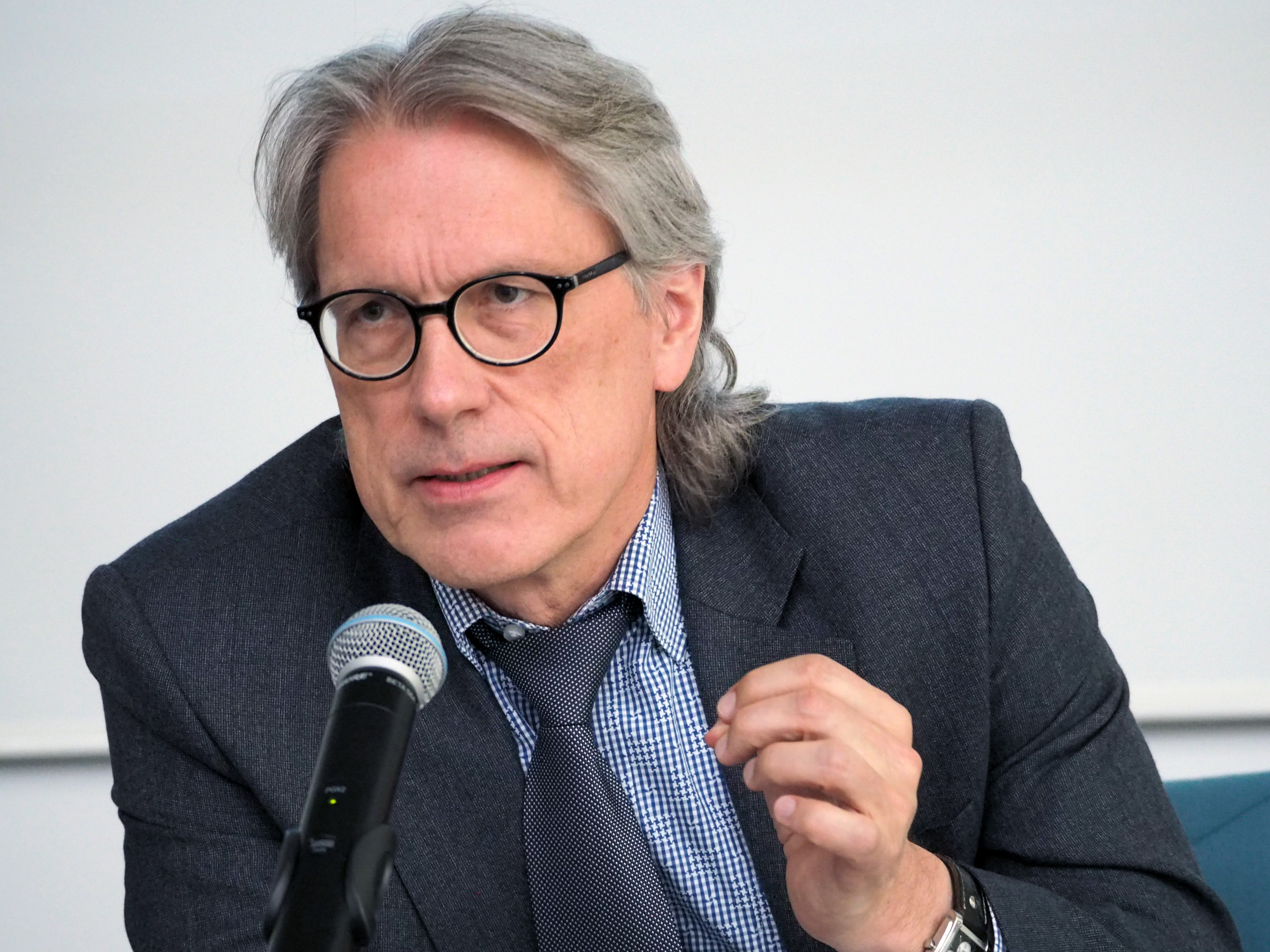

State Minister of Finance
- In office 2014–2021
- Preceded by: Ulrich Nußbaum
- Succeeded by: Daniel Wesener

Personal details
- Born: September 24, 1957 (age 69)
- Party: SPD

Matthias Kollatz (born 24 September 1957) is a German politician of the Social Democratic Party of Germany (SPD) who served as State Minister of Finance in the government of Mayor Michael Müller of Berlin from 2014 to 2021.

== Career ==
From 2006 until 2011, Kollatz served as Vice President and Member of the Management Committee of the European Investment Bank (EIB) under the leadership of president Philippe Maystadt; he was succeeded by Werner Hoyer.

From 2012 until 2014, Kollatz worked as Senior Adviser at PricewaterhouseCoopers. Ahead of the 2013 state elections in Hesse, Thorsten Schäfer-Gümbel included him in his shadow cabinet for the SPD campaign to unseat incumbent Volker Bouffier as Minister-President.

From 2014 until 2021, Kollatz served as State Minister of Finance in the government of Mayor Michael Müller of Berlin. As one of the state's representatives at the Bundesrat, he was a member of the Committee on Legal Affairs. He was also a member of the German-French Friendship Group set up by the German Bundesrat and the French Senate.

In the 2016 state elections, Kollatz became a member of the Abgeordnetenhaus of Berlin, representing the Steglitz-Zehlendorf district. In the negotiations to form a coalition government between the Christian Democratic Union (CDU) and the SPD under the leadership of Kai Wegner following the 2023 state elections, he was part of his party’s delegation to the working group on the state budget and financial policy. In similar negotiations to form a coalition government in Berlin under the prospective leadership of Elif Eralp following the 2026 state elections, he led his party's delegation in the working group on the budget.

== Other activities (selection) ==
=== Corporate boards ===
- Berliner Wasserbetriebe (BWB), Ex-Officio Member of the Supervisory Board (2014–2021)
- Charité, Ex-Officio Member of the Supervisory Board (2014–2021)
- Investitionsbank Berlin (IBB), Ex-Officio Member of the Supervisory Board (2014–2021)
- Vivantes, Ex-Officio Member of the Supervisory Board (2014–2021)

=== Non-profit organizations ===
- Business Forum of the Social Democratic Party of Germany, Member of the Political Advisory Board (since 2020)

== Personal life ==
Kollatz was married to fellow SPD politician Doris Ahnen from 1993 until 2018. He has a son.
