= Schaubühne =

Theatre in the Wilmersdorf district of Berlin, Germany

Coordinates: 52°29′55″N 13°18′08″E

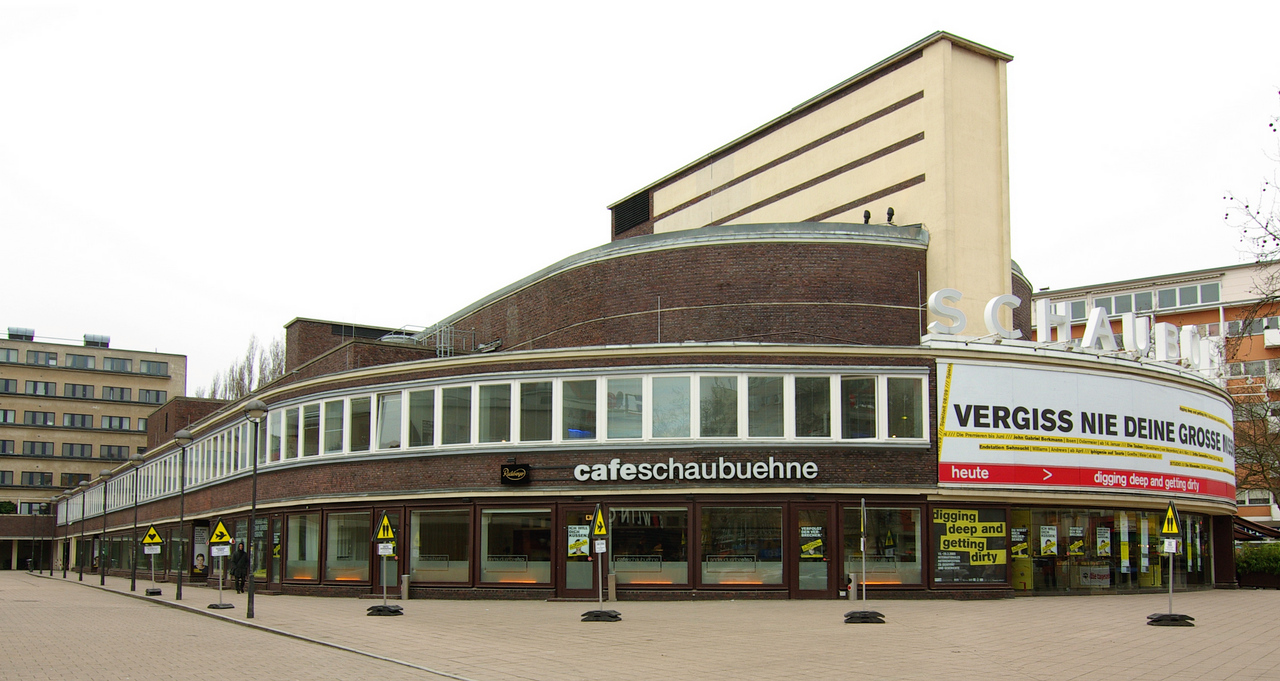
- Schaubühne am Lehniner Platz on Kurfürstendamm
- Interactive map of Schaubühne
- Full name: Schaubühne am Lehniner Platz
- Address: Kurfürstendamm 153; Berlin; Germany
- Type: Theatre

Construction
- Built: 1928
- Architect: Erich Mendelsohn

Website
- schaubuehne.de

The Schaubühne am Lehniner Platz (Theatre on Lehniner Square) is a famous theatre in the Wilmersdorf district of Berlin, located on the Kurfürstendamm boulevard. It is a conversion of the Universum cinema, built according to plans designed by Erich Mendelsohn in 1928.

== History ==
The cinema was the centrepiece of the wider WOGA housing complex, designed by Mendelsohn in a New Objectivity-styled urban development ensemble, with a shopping walkway, apartment blocks, lawns, and a tennis court in the back. It possibly was the first Modernist cinema built in the world, as opposed to the Moorish, Egyptian, and baroque styles that predominated. Mendelsohn wrote a short text on his cinema, declaring 'no Baroque palaces for Buster Keaton'. The cinema would become very influential on Streamline Moderne cinema design in the 1930s.

Heavily damaged in World War II, it was rebuilt and re-opened and from 1969 served as a dance hall and for musical theatre. The building's current use as a lyric-style theatre dates from the late 1970s, when the Schaubühne ensemble around Peter Stein, formerly residing on Hallesches Ufer in Kreuzberg, searched for a new venue. From 1978 to 1981, the interiors were completely changed, centred on a theatre hall with adjustable spaces and no separation of audience and performers.

The Schaubühne ensemble itself was founded in 1962. It became the domain of Peter Stein in 1970. Stein had sparked a theatre scandal in Munich, where he had staged Peter Weiss' Viet Nam Diskurs, by collecting money among the theatre-goers in order to support the Viet Cong. Strongly influenced by the Protests of 1968 and the German student movement, his first production of Brecht's The Mother, starring Therese Giehse, immediately earned fierce protests by conservative West Berlin politicians, who spoke of "communist agitation". The next year, the ensemble received the Deutscher Kritikerpreis award for the performance of Ibsen's Peer Gynt. In the following years, the Schaubühne directed by Stein and his dramaturgical assistant Botho Strauß became one of the leading theatre stages in Germany.

In 1999, Thomas Ostermeier took over as artistic director at Schaubühne am Lehniner Platz in Berlin, alongside co-directors Jens Hillje and Sasha Waltz. Waltz opened the Schaubühne under new direction with the debut of Körper (2000). With a move towards social theatre, attendance increased by 14%.

Since 2000, the theatre has hosted Streitraum, a series of political public panel discussions now moderated by Carolin Emcke.

Waltz left on the expiration of her five-year contract and reactivated her independent company Sasha Waltz & Guests, based in Berlin.

Since 2005, Thomas Ostermeier and Jens Hillje have been responsible for a vigorous modern orientation of Stein's former theatre, where tradition still has its place with a focus on interpretations of classic works.

== Touring ==
Under Ostermeier and intendant Tobias Veit, Schaubühne productions have toured internationally.

Australia in particular has seen Schaubühne productions since 2006. The ensemble made its Australian debut with Nora at the 2006 Adelaide Festival, followed by Cat on a Hot Tin Roof at the 2008 Adelaide Festival (both under the artistic direction of Brett Sheehy). Hamlet was staged at the 2010 Sydney Festival (under the artistic direction of Lindy Hume), and Trust was performed at the 2011 Perth International Arts Festival (under the artistic direction of Shelagh Magazda). Schaubühne's Hedda Gabler appeared at the 2011 Melbourne Festival, and the following year, An Enemy of the People was staged at the same festival (both under the artistic direction of Brett Sheehy). All productions which have toured Australia have been directed by Ostermeier, except for Trust, which was directed by Falk Richter and Anouk van Dijk.
