= Bernhard Pörksen =

German media scholar (born 1969)

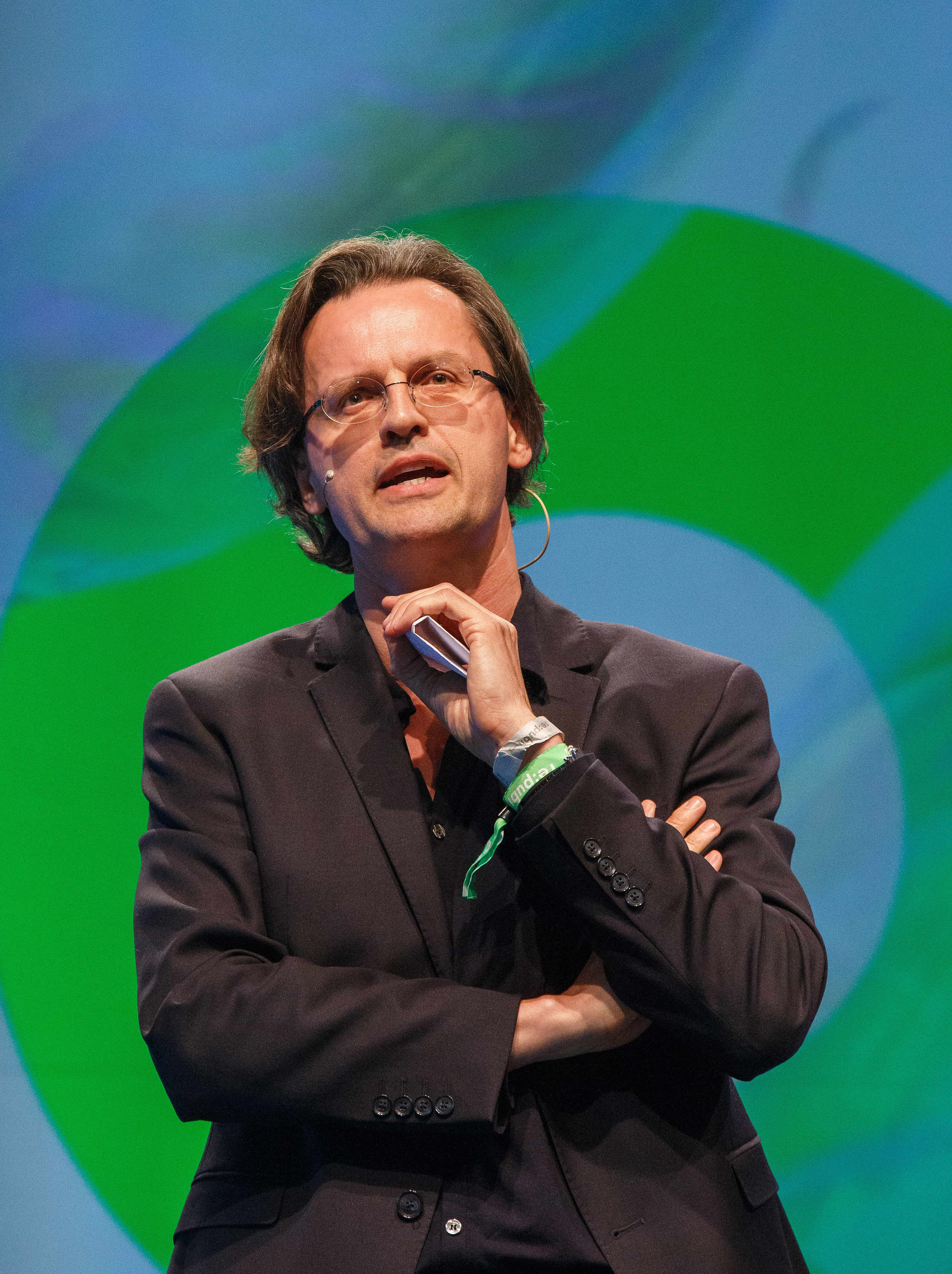
Pörksen in 2018

Bernhard Pörksen (born 1969) is a German media scholar and author of books about communication theory, systems thinking, cybernetics and the effects of digitalization. He teaches at the University of Tübingen.

== Life ==
Bernhard Pörksen studied German language and literature, journalism and biology at the University of Hamburg. At the invitation of Ivan Illich he spent several research periods at Pennsylvania State University. Between 1996 and 1997, he worked both as a freelance journalist and as a voluntary editorial staff member of a newspaper. He has published essays, commentaries and critical contributions to debates in numerous German daily and weekly newspapers, magazines and online media.

Between 1997 and 1999, Pörksen prepared his thesis entitled Die Konstruktion von Feindbildern: zum Sprachgebrauch in neonazistischen Medien (English: The construction of enemy images on the use of language by neo-Nazi media). In 2000, he taught communication and linguistics at the University of Greifswald. From 2002 he held the position of a professor for journalism and communication studies at the University of Hamburg. In 2006 he deputized for the chair of communication theory and media culture at the University of Münster. In 2007 he successfully completed the formal qualifying procedures for independent research and teaching as a university professor for communication and media studies (Habilitation).

In 2008 he was offered the chair for media studies at the University of Tübingen. In November 2008 he was elected "Professor of the Year" and awarded special honors for his teaching activities. From 2009 to 2011 he was commissioner for the foundation and development of the institute of Media Studies at the University of Tübingen and its managing director.

== Scientific contribution ==
Among the topics of his research, counselling, and lecturing activities are the dynamics of public outrage, media scandals and questions of media ethics, models and theories of communication, styles of stage management in politics and the media, and journalism and celebrity.

In addition, he has published widely on systems thinking and the epistemology of constructivism. His books Thruth is the Invention of a Liar (co-authored wit the cybernetician Heinz von Foerster, originally published under the title Understanding Systems), From Being to Doing (co-authored with the Chilean neurobiologist Humberto Maturana), and The Certainty of Uncertainty serve as introductions to constructivist and systems thinking. In his book The Creation of Reality, Pörksen supports a line of constructivism that he calls "discursive constructivsm": In his view, constructivism's relativsm and skepticism are merely a corrective to discursive dogmas, not a new "doctrine of salvation".

Another focus of Pörksen's research is on scandal and crisis communication. Pörksen believes that scandals reflect value debates and that the collective outrage reveals the state of society, taboos and "exitability". In the book written with the colleague Hanne Detel, "The unleashed scandal. The end of control in the digital age" he shows that the evolution and escalation of the scandal has entered a new phase in the digital age. The claim is that each and everyone can nowadays trigger a scandal, and that each and everyone can become its target and victim. Traditional dramaturgical principles of the classical mass media, e.g. the height of a plunge to the depths, are no longer key criteria. The fundamental implication of the authors' analyses is that the uncontrollability of public effects has become an integral part of everybody's daily experience. This new look at scandal in the digital age has provoked a lively debate in the German-speaking world and is considered to be a novel, Internet-oriented approach in the field of scandal research.

In his book Digital Fever: Taming the Big Business of Disinformation (2022), Pörksen builds on media theory (Marshall McLuhan, Neil Postman, etc.) to study the social consequences of connectivity and digitalization. Drawing on case studies, he describes changes in the idea of truth, the dynamics of revelations, the nature of debates, and ideas about authority and power. Pörksen shows why he believes Eli Pariser’s model of the filter bubble to be misleading. It is, he argues, contradicted by empirical studies, insights from network theory, and everyday experiences of the wealth and diversity of information. Rather, the digital age is defined by the filter clash, the clash of parallel public spheres; in our interconnected world, it is possible to withdraw into one’s “self-confirmatory milieu” but not to escape the world-view or ideology of other people. As people get too close to each other, the result is a “digital fever.” Based on the “overheating and polarization” of communication, Pörksen postulates that people should be taught media maturity, enabling them to become their own journalistic gatekeepers. He calls this the “utopia of an editorial society.” According to Pörksen, the ideals and maxims of good journalism (two-source rule, audiatur et altera pars, etc.) contain a general ethics of communication – an educational vision that critics commended but also criticized as naive. The computer developer and Internet pioneer Lee Felsenstein, member of the Homebrew Computer Club, stated in the books's preface that the idea of the editorial society redefines journalism as “a function essential to the functioning of the information community.”

To empower individuals on the path toward an editorial society, Pörksen proposes three approaches: First, it takes a new school subject at the intersection of philosophical ethics, social psychology, media studies, and computer science that would teach both media and power analysis and media practice. Second, journalism has to become more transparent and dialogic, and engage in a never-ending conversation with a public that itself has become a media-empowered “fifth power.” Finally, so-called platform councils could serve as models for platform regulation. For Pörksen, the creation of platform councils would be useful as points of contact for refereeing and correcting decisions. Such councils would be tasked with discussing and making transparent the platforms’ practices and power (information on how they moderate content, influence public opinion, deal with political advertising and disinformation) on the platforms themselves, thus enabling citizens to make a more informed and mature assessment of journalistic guidelines without limiting freedom of speech and expression.

Together with the German communication psychologist Friedemann Schulz von Thun, Pörksen has co-written two books, one of which (Kommunikation als Lebenskunst) has also been published in English as Communication as an Art of Living. Proceeding from the key assumptions of humanistic psychology, the authors define the art of living as an "art of finding out" as individuals move toward an individually "congruent life", combining personal needs with a commitment to a life's assignment that extends beyond the self. In their book Die Kunst des Miteinander-Redens, Pörksen and Schulz von Thun explore the question of how to improve the quality of debates. Connecting psychology and media studies, the authors analyze opportunities and obstacles to engaging in and keeping up the dialogue with people of radically different opinions but also with conspiracy theorists and exponents of extremist positions. They discuss the limits and "red lines" of discourse, and use role play and communication psychology models such as the values and development squares to illustrate techniques of polarization and conflict mitigation. The authors define the core of their dialogic ethics as empathy combined with the willingness to have a clarifying confrontation, a factual argument.

In addition, Pörksen is a member of the editorial boards of various systemic-constructivist journals (Constructivist Foundations, Cybernetics & Human Knowing, Familiendynamik). He is a member of the advisory board of the journals Pop. Kultur und Kritik, Universitas and Spiel and, together with the linguist Ingrid Schröder, is editor of the book series Sprache in der Gesellschaft (Language in Society), which publishes works at the intersection of linguistics and media studies. He is series editor of Systemische Horizonte: Theorie der Praxis at Carl-Auer Verlag; the books published in this series show how constructivism and systems theory can be applied practically in organizational counseling and management, in politics, education and didactics. The series also features seminal works in epistemology, cybernetics, communication psychology, emotions research and the study of metaphors.

== Journalism and Media Work ==
On top of his academic puclications, Pörksen also writes opinion pieces and essays on current media policy debates and issues for German, Austrian and Swiss media outlets (e.g.: Die Zeit, Die Presse, Neue Zürcher Zeitung). From 2024 until 2025, he was a columnist for the German news magazine Der Spiegel, which also published his contributions in Englisch translation. In his essays and interviews, Pörksen has engaged with issues such as the overheating of disaster reporting under real-time conditions; the responsibility of Internet platforms such as Facebook or X; refinancing models for quality newspapers; the renaissance of conspiracy theories; the Böhmermann affair; the effects of media transparency on politics; destructive forms of public moralization and scandalization; the ethics of public communication and of debate culture, the distorting power of storytelling in journalism; climate communicaton; and the marginalization of the "public intellectual" within the academic system. Moreover, he has presented concepts to proactively fight disinformation.

Pörksen has written several books together with his students at the Universities of Hambrug and Tübingen. The books deal with media-related topics such as celebrity studies, the power of public outrage and the transformation of journalism. They are attempts to combine theory and practice in the training of journalists through concrete project work. In addition, Pörksen is one of the initators of the Charta of Digital Fundamental Rights of the European Union, which was published in late November 2016. Journalists and politicians, in their comments and statements on media policy debates, have referred to Pörksen's research findings and formulations ("outrage democracy", "fifth power", "defamatory satire", "the unleashed scandal").

According to Dirk Kurbjuweit, editor-in-chief of Der Spiegel, Pörksen is "likely the best-known observer and critic of the media in Germany". Referring to Pörksen's contributions, the TV-critic Hans Hoff noted that the media scholar did not really fit in a TV and talkshow world defined by positioning battles and "excitement epidemics".

== Awards and Honors ==
- 2008 - Professor of the Year
- 2013 - Award for the book Der entfesselte Skandal (The Unleashed Scandal, co-authored with Hanne Detel) as part of the “Geisteswissenschaften international” (Humanities International) program
- 2013 - Studium Professionale Prize of the University of Tübingen for the book Die gehetzte Politik: Die neue Macht der Medien und Märkte (co-authored with students)
- March 2018 - March 2018 – Die große Gereiztheit (Digital Fever) selected Non-fiction Book of the Month
- 2020/2021 - Fellowship at the Thomas Mann House, Los Angeles
- 2021 - “Gegen Vergessen – Für Demokratie” Prize
- 2024 - Erich Fromm Prize for his work and public engagement
- 2026 - Tübingen Prize for Knowledge Communication

== Books in English ==
- with Friedemann Schulz von Thun: Communication as an Art of Living. The Philosophy and Practice of Talking with Each Other. (London: Routledge, 2026)
- with Heinz von Foerster: Truth Is the Invention of a Liar: Conversations on Epistemology and Ethics, 2nd ed., trans. Karen Leube (Heidelberg: Carl-Auer Verlag, 2024)
- Digital Fever: Taming the Big Business of Disinformation, trans. Alison Rosemary Koeck and Wolfram Karl Koeck (London: Palgrave Macmillan, 2022)
- with Hanne Detel: The unleashed scandal. The end of control in the digital age. (Exeter: Imprint Academic, 2014)
- The Creation of Reality. A Constructivist Epistemology of Journalism and Journalism Education. (Exeter: Imprint Academic, 2011)
- The Certainty of Uncertainty - Dialogues Introducing Constructivism. (Exeter: Imprint Academic, 2004)
- with Humberto R. Maturana: From Being to Doing. The Origins of the Biology of Cognition. (Heidelberg: Carl Auer, 2004)

== Books in German ==
- Die Konstruktion von Feindbildern: Zum Sprachgebrauch in neonazistischen Medien. With a foreword by Johano Strasser (Wiesbaden: VS Verlag für Sozialwissenschaften, 2005)
- with Friedemann Schulz von Thun: Kommunikation als Lebenskunst: Philosophie und Praxis des Miteinander-Redens. (Heidelberg: Auer, 2014)
- Die Beobachtung des Beobachters. Eine Erkenntnistheorie der Journalistik. (Heidelberg: Carl-Auer-Systeme, 2015)
- with Friedemann Schulz von Thun: Die Kunst des Miteinander-Redens: Über den Dialog in Gesellschaft und Politik (Munich: Hanser, 2020).
- Zuhören: Die Kunst, sich der Welt zu öffnen (Munich: Hanser, 2025).
