= Hans Leyendecker =

German journalist

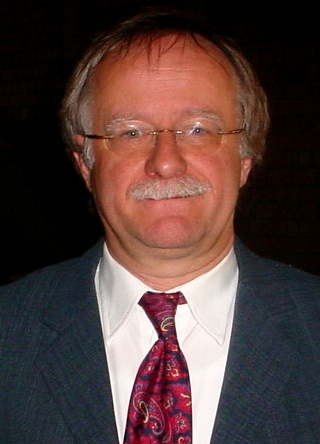
- Leyendecker in 2004
- Born: 12 May 1949 (age 77); Brühl, North Rhine-Westphalia

Hans Leyendecker (born 12 May 1949) is a German journalist. He writes for the Süddeutsche Zeitung and is one of Germany's best known investigative journalists.

== Life ==
Hans Leyendecker did a journalistic traineeship (Voluntariat) at “Stader Tageblatt” and than worked as a freelancer in Bavaria. He studied history. Later he worked for “Westfälische Rundschau” in Dortmund.

In 1979 he started to work for Der Spiegel. In 1995 he was Columnist and Head of Department for Special Assignments in Hamburg. Since 1997 he worked for Süddeutsche Zeitung. From 2009 till 2016 he was head of the investigative departement.

He unveiling various political and economic scandals, such as the widespread illegal party financing during the 1980s, and that of the CDU in 1999. He also unveiled the smuggling of Russian plutonium into Germany, with the help of the foreign intelligence service Bundesnachrichtendienst in 1994, bribery at arms deals, German Visa Affair 2005 and corruption of the staff council at Volkswagen. For his probe into the tax evasion of the father of the than German tennis star Steffi Graf, he received death threats from adoring Graf fans.

In 2000, Leyendecker co-authored a 600-page investigative book of the illicit financial dealings of former German Chancellor Helmut Kohl, titled Helmut Kohl, die Macht und das Geld (Helmut Kohl: The Power and the Money).

He was president for the 2019 German protestant Church Assembly (Kirchentag) in Dortmund. Leyendecker is married, has five children and lives in Leichlingen.
