= Sonja Zekri =

German journalist

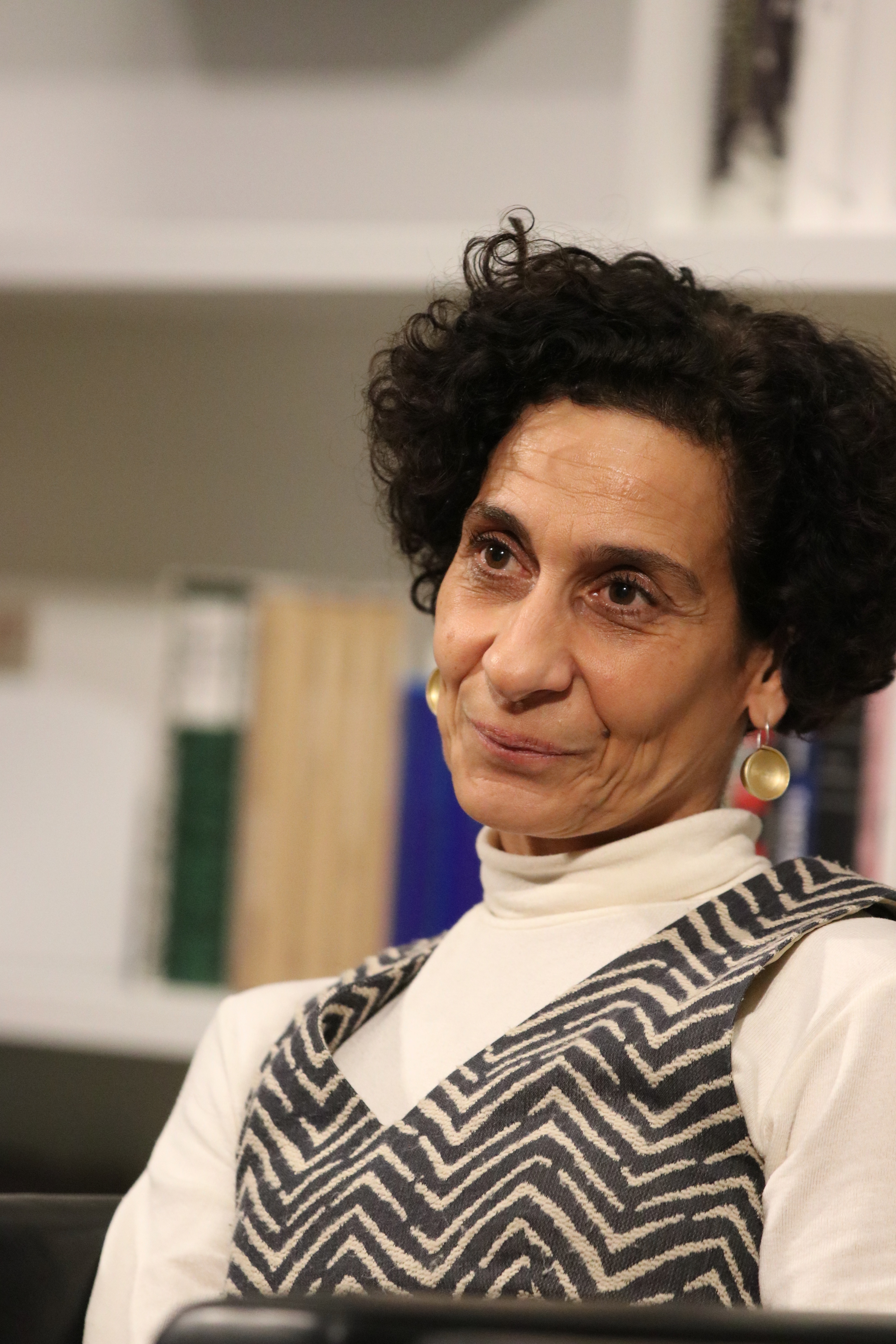
- Zekri in 2019
- Born: 1967 (age 58–59); Dortmund
- Education: Ruhr University Bochum
- Occupations: Journalist; Author
- Organizations: Süddeutsche Zeitung

Sonja Zekri (born 1967) is a German journalist and author. Her topics are Near East, Eastern Europe, culture and religion, among others.

== Career ==
Born in Dortmund, Zekri studied history and Slavic languages at the Ruhr University Bochum. From 2001 she worked for the Feuilleton of the Süddeutsche Zeitung (SZ). She participated in publishing a series in 17 entries Deutschland extrem, which appeared first in the SZ and then as a book in 2004. From 2008 to 2011 she was the correspondent of the SZ in Moscow. From April 2011 she was the correspondent in Cairo for both the SZ and the Tages-Anzeigers, reporting from the Arabian region.

From 2015 to 2020 she has been the director, together with Andrian Kreye, the Feuilleton of the SZ. Since 2020 she is reporter for cultural reports fpr Süddeutsche Zeitung in Berlin.

== Selected publications ==
- Sonja Zekri, Alex Rühle (ed.): Deutschland extrem - Reisen in eine unbekannte Republik. C. H. Beck, Munich 2004, ISBN 978-3-406-50976-6.
