= Critical theory =

Approach to social philosophy

Critical theory is a social, historical, and political school of thought and philosophical perspective which centers on analyzing and challenging systemic power relations in society, arguing that knowledge, truth, and social structures are fundamentally shaped by power dynamics between dominant and oppressed groups. Beyond just understanding and critiquing these dynamics, it explicitly aims to transform society through praxis and collective action with an explicit sociopolitical purpose.

Critical theory's main tenets center on analyzing systemic power relations in society, focusing on the dynamics between groups with different levels of social, economic, and institutional power. Unlike traditional social theories that aim primarily to describe and understand society, critical theory explicitly seeks to critique and transform it. Thus, it positions itself as both an analytical framework and a movement for social change. Critical theory examines how dominant groups and structures influence what society considers objective truth, challenging the very notion of pure objectivity and rationality by arguing that knowledge is shaped by power relations and social context. Key principles of critical theory include examining intersecting forms of oppression, emphasizing historical contexts in social analysis, and critiquing capitalist structures. The framework emphasizes praxis (combining theory with action) and claims to highlight how lived experience, collective action, ideology, and educational systems play crucial roles in maintaining or challenging existing power structures.

== Overview ==
Critical theorist Nancy Fraser summarises the difference between a critical and uncritical theory as follows:

A critical social theory frames its research program and its conceptual framework with an eye to the aims and activities of those oppositional social movements with which it has a partisan though not uncritical identification. The questions it asks and the models it designs are informed by that identification and interest. Thus, for example, if struggles contesting the subordination of women figured among the most significant of a given age, then a critical social theory for that time would aim, among other things, to shed light on the character and bases of such subordination. It would employ categories and explanatory models which revealed rather than occluded relations of male dominance and female subordination. And it would demystify as ideological rival approaches which obfuscated or rationalized those relations. In this situation, then, one of the standards for assessing a critical theory, once it had been subjected to all the usual tests of empirical adequacy, would be: How well does it theorize the situation and prospects of the feminist movement? To what extent does it serve the self-clarification of the struggles and wishes of contemporary women?

The historical evolution of critical theory traces back to the first generation of the Frankfurt School in the 1920s. Figures like Max Horkheimer, Theodor Adorno, Herbert Marcuse, and others sought to expand traditional Marxist analysis by incorporating insights from psychology, culture, and philosophy, moving beyond pure economic determinism. Their work was significantly influenced by Freud's psychoanalytic theories, particularly how subjective experience shaped human consciousness, behavior, and social reality. Freud's concept that an individual's lived experience could differ dramatically from objective reality aligned with critical theory's critique of positivism, science, and pure rationality.

Critical theory continued to evolve beyond the first generation of the Frankfurt School. Jürgen Habermas, often identified with the second generation, shifted the focus toward communication and the role of language in social emancipation. Around the same time, post-structuralist and postmodern thinkers, including Michel Foucault and Jacques Derrida, were reshaping academic discourse with critiques of knowledge, meaning, power, institutions, and social control with deconstructive approaches that further challenged assumptions about objectivity and truth. Though neither Foucault nor Derrida belonged formally to the Frankfurt School tradition, their works profoundly influenced later formulations of critical theory. Collectively, the post-structuralist and postmodern insights expanded the scope of critical theory, weaving cultural and linguistic critiques into its Marxian roots.

With the emigration of Herbert Marcuse, contemporary critical theory has been applied to the United States and today it covers a wide range of social critique within economics, ethics, history, law, politics, psychology, and sociology, with a diverse list of subjects including critical animal studies, critical criminology, dependency theory and imperialism studies, critical environmental justice, feminist theory and gender studies, critical historiography, intersectionality, critical legal studies, critical pedagogy, postcolonialism, critical race theory, queer theory, and critical terrorism studies. Modern critical theory represents a movement away from Marxism's purely economic analysis to a broader examination of social and cultural power structures with the incorporation and transformation of Freudian concepts and postmodernism, while retaining Marxism's emphasis on analyzing how dominant groups and systems shape and control society through exploitation and oppression along with social and political praxis, the adaptation and reformulation of multiple Marxian conceptual frameworks (including alienation, reification, ideology, emancipation, base and superstructure), and a general skepticism towards and critique of capitalism.

Criticism of critical theory have come from various intellectual perspectives. Critics have raised concerns about critical theory's reliance on Marxist revisionism and its frequent emphasis on subjective narratives, which can sometimes be at odds with empirical methodologies. They also point to issues of circular reasoning and a lack of falsifiability in some critical theory arguments, as well as an epistemological and methodological stance that challenges or conflicts with traditional scientific methods and ideals of rationality and objectivity.

== History ==
Max Horkheimer first defined critical theory (German: kritische Theorie) in his 1937 essay "Traditional and Critical Theory", as a social theory oriented toward critiquing and changing society as a whole, in contrast to traditional theory oriented only toward understanding or explaining it. Wanting to distinguish critical theory as a radical, emancipatory form of Marxist philosophy, Horkheimer critiqued both the model of science put forward by logical positivism, and what he and his colleagues saw as the covert positivism and authoritarianism of orthodox Marxism and Communism. He described a theory as critical insofar as it seeks "to liberate human beings from the circumstances that enslave them". Critical theory involves a normative dimension, either by criticizing society in terms of some general theory of values or norms (oughts), or by criticizing society in terms of its own espoused values (i.e. immanent critique). Significantly, critical theory not only conceptualizes and critiques societal power structures, but also establishes an empirically grounded model to link society to the human subject. It defends the universalist ambitions of the tradition, but does so within a specific context of social-scientific and historical research.

The core concepts of critical theory are that it should:

- be directed at the totality of society in its historical specificity (i.e., how it came to be configured at a specific point in time)
- improve understanding of society by integrating all the major social sciences, including geography, economics, sociology, history, political science, anthropology, and psychology

Postmodern critical theory is another major product of critical theory. It analyzes the fragmentation of cultural identities in order to challenge modernist-era constructs such as metanarratives, rationality, and universal truths, while politicizing social problems "by situating them in historical and cultural contexts, to implicate themselves in the process of collecting and analyzing data, and to relativize their findings".

=== Marx ===
Marx explicitly developed the notion of critique into the critique of ideology, linking it with the practice of social revolution, as stated in the 11th section of his Theses on Feuerbach: "The philosophers have only interpreted the world, in various ways; the point is to change it." In early works, including The German Ideology, Marx developed his concepts of false consciousness and of ideology as the interests of one section of society masquerading as the interests of society as a whole.

=== Adorno and Horkheimer ===
One of the distinguishing characteristics of critical theory, as Theodor W. Adorno and Max Horkheimer elaborated in their Dialectic of Enlightenment (1947), is an ambivalence about the ultimate source or foundation of social domination, an ambivalence that gave rise to the "pessimism" of the new critical theory about the possibility of human emancipation and freedom. This ambivalence was rooted in the historical circumstances in which the work was originally produced, particularly the rise of Nazism, state capitalism, and culture industry as entirely new forms of social domination that could not be adequately explained in the terms of traditional Marxist sociology.

For Adorno and Horkheimer, state intervention in the economy had effectively abolished the traditional tension between Marxism's "relations of production" and "material productive forces" of society. The market (as an "unconscious" mechanism for the distribution of goods) had been replaced by centralized planning.

Contrary to Marx's prediction in the Preface to a Contribution to the Critique of Political Economy, this shift did not lead to "an era of social revolution" but to fascism and totalitarianism. As a result, critical theory was left, in Habermas's words, without "anything in reserve to which it might appeal, and when the forces of production enter into a baneful symbiosis with the relations of production that they were supposed to blow wide open, there is no longer any dynamism upon which critique could base its hope". For Adorno and Horkheimer, this posed the problem of how to account for the apparent persistence of domination in the absence of the very contradiction that, according to traditional critical theory, was the source of domination itself.

=== Habermas ===
In the 1960s, Habermas, a proponent of critical social theory, raised the epistemological discussion to a new level in his Knowledge and Human Interests (1968), by identifying critical knowledge as based on principles that differentiated it either from the natural sciences or the humanities, through its orientation to self-reflection and emancipation. Although unsatisfied with Adorno and Horkheimer's thought in Dialectic of Enlightenment, Habermas shares the view that, in the form of instrumental rationality, the era of modernity marks a move away from the liberation of enlightenment and toward a new form of enslavement. In Habermas's work, critical theory transcended its theoretical roots in German idealism, and progressed closer to American pragmatism.

Habermas's ideas about the relationship between modernity and rationalization are in this sense strongly influenced by Max Weber. He further dissolved the elements of critical theory derived from Hegelian German idealism, though his epistemology remains broadly Marxist. Perhaps his two most influential ideas are the concepts of the public sphere and communicative action, the latter arriving partly as a reaction to new post-structural or so-called "postmodern" challenges to the discourse of modernity. Habermas engaged in regular correspondence with Richard Rorty, and a strong sense of philosophical pragmatism may be felt in his thought, which frequently traverses the boundaries between sociology and philosophy.

=== Contemporary critical theorists ===
Contemporary philosophers and researchers who have focused on understanding and critiquing critical theory include Nancy Fraser, Axel Honneth, Judith Butler, and Rahel Jaeggi. Honneth is known for his works Pathology of Reason and The Legacy of Critical Theory, in which he attempts to explain critical theory's purpose in a modern context. Jaeggi focuses on both critical theory's original intent and a more modern understanding that some argue has created a new foundation for modern usage of critical theory. Butler contextualizes critical theory as a way to rhetorically challenge oppression and inequality, specifically concepts of gender.

Honneth established a theory that many use to understand critical theory, the theory of recognition. In this theory, he asserts that in order for someone to be responsible for themselves and their own identity they must be also recognized by those around them: without recognition in this sense from peers and society, individuals can never become wholly responsible for themselves and others, nor experience true freedom and emancipation—i.e., without recognition, the individual cannot achieve self-actualization.

Like many others who put stock in critical theory, Jaeggi is vocal about capitalism's cost to society. Throughout her writings, she has remained doubtful about the necessity and use of capitalism in regard to critical theory. Most of Jaeggi's interpretations of critical theory seem to work against the foundations of Habermas and follow more along the lines of Honneth in terms of how to look at the economy through the theory's lens. She shares many of Honneth's beliefs, and many of her works try to defend them against criticism Honneth has received.

To provide a dialectical opposite to Jaeggi's conception of alienation as 'a relation of relationlessness', Hartmut Rosa has proposed the concept of resonance. Rosa uses this term to refer to moments when late modern subjects experience momentary feelings of self-efficacy in society, bringing them into a temporary moment of relatedness with some aspect of the world. Rosa describes himself as working within the critical theory tradition of the Frankfurt School, providing an extensive critique of late modernity through his concept of social acceleration. However his resonance theory has been questioned for moving too far beyond the Adornoian tradition of "looking coldly at society".

== Fields ==
=== Postmodern critical social theory ===
Focusing on language, symbolism, communication, and social construction, critical theory has been applied in the social sciences as a critique of social construction and postmodern society.

While modernist critical theory (as described above) concerns itself with "forms of authority and injustice that accompanied the evolution of industrial and corporate capitalism as a political-economic system", postmodern critical theory politicizes social problems "by situating them in historical and cultural contexts, to implicate themselves in the process of collecting and analyzing data, and to relativize their findings". Meaning itself is seen as unstable due to social structures' rapid transformation. As a result, research focuses on local manifestations rather than broad generalizations.

Postmodern critical research is also characterized by the crisis of representation, which rejects the idea that a researcher's work is an "objective depiction of a stable other". Instead, many postmodern scholars have adopted "alternatives that encourage reflection about the 'politics and poetics' of their work. In these accounts, the embodied, collaborative, dialogic, and improvisational aspects of qualitative research are clarified."

The term critical theory is often appropriated when an author works in sociological terms, yet attacks the social or human sciences, thus attempting to remain "outside" those frames of inquiry. Michel Foucault has been described as one such author. Jean Baudrillard has also been described as a critical theorist to the extent that he was an unconventional and critical sociologist; this appropriation is similarly casual, holding little or no relation to the Frankfurt School. In contrast, Habermas is one of the key critics of postmodernism.

==== Communication studies ====
When, in the 1970s and 1980s, Habermas redefined critical social theory as a study of communication, with communicative competence and communicative rationality on the one hand, and distorted communication on the other, the two versions of critical theory began to overlap to a much greater degree than before.

=== Critical disability theory ===
At the intersection of disability studies and critical theory is critical disability theory. The term crip theory originates in Carrie Sandahl's article "Queering the Crip or Crippling the Queer?: Intersections of Queer and Crip Identities in Solo Autobiographical Performance". It was published in 2003 as part of a journal issue titled "Desiring Disability: Queer Theory Meets Disability Studies". Christopher Bell's Blackness and Disability; and the work of Robert McRuer both explore queerness and disability. Work includes the intersections of race and ethnicity with disability in the field of education studies and has attempted to bridge critical race theory with disability studies.

=== Critical legal studies ===
Critical legal studies (CLS) is a school of critical theory that developed in the United States during the 1970s. CLS views laws as devised to maintain the status quo of society and thereby codify its biases against marginalized groups.

==== Immigration studies ====
Critical theory can be used to interpret the right of asylum and immigration law.

=== Critical finance studies ===
Critical finance studies apply critical theory to financial markets and central banks.

=== Critical management studies ===
Critical management studies (CMS) is a loose but extensive grouping of theoretically informed critiques of management, business and organisation, grounded originally in a critical theory perspective. Today it encompasses a wide range of perspectives that are critical of traditional theories of management and the business schools that generate these theories.

=== Critical international relations theory ===
Critical international relations theory is a diverse set of schools of thought in international relations (IR) that have criticized the theoretical, meta-theoretical and/or political status quo, both in IR theory and in international politics more broadly – from positivist as well as postpositivist positions. Positivist critiques include Marxist and neo-Marxist approaches and certain ("conventional") strands of social constructivism. Postpositivist critiques include poststructuralist, postcolonial, "critical" constructivist, critical theory (in the strict sense used by the Frankfurt School), neo-Gramscian, most feminist, and some English School approaches, as well as non-Weberian historical sociology, "international political sociology", "critical geopolitics", and the so-called "new materialism" (partly inspired by actor–network theory). All of these latter approaches differ from both realism and liberalism in their epistemological and ontological premises.

=== Critical race theory ===
Critical race theory (CRT) is a conceptual framework developed to understand the relationships between social conceptions of race and ethnicity in the United States, social and political laws, and mass media. CRT also considers racism to be systemic in various laws and rules, not based only on individuals' prejudices. The word critical in the name is an academic reference to critical theory, not criticizing or blaming individuals.

=== Critical pedagogy ===
Critical theorists have widely credited Paulo Freire for the first applications of critical theory to education/pedagogy, considering his best-known work to be Pedagogy of the Oppressed, a seminal text in what is now known as the philosophy and social movement of critical pedagogy. Dedicated to the oppressed and based on his own experience helping Brazilian adults learn to read and write, Freire includes a detailed class analysis in his exploration of the relationship between the colonizer and the colonized. In the book, he calls traditional pedagogy the "banking model of education", because it treats the student as an empty vessel to be filled with knowledge. He argues that pedagogy should instead treat the learner as a co-creator of knowledge.

In contrast to the banking model, the teacher in the critical-theory model is not the dispenser of all knowledge, but a participant who learns with and from the students—in conversation with them, even as they learn from the teacher. The goal is to liberate the learner from an oppressive construct of teacher versus student, a dichotomy analogous to colonizer and colonized. It is not enough for the student to analyze societal power structures and hierarchies, to merely recognize imbalance and inequity; critical theory pedagogy must also empower the learner to reflect and act on that reflection to challenge an oppressive status quo.

==== Critical consciousness ====
Critical consciousness, conscientization, or conscientização in Portuguese (Portuguese pronunciation: [kõsjẽtʃizaˈsɐ̃w]), is a popular education and social concept developed by Brazilian pedagogue and educational theorist Paulo Freire, grounded in neo-Marxist critical theory. Critical consciousness focuses on achieving an in-depth understanding of the world, allowing for the perception and exposure of social and political contradictions. Critical consciousness also includes taking action against the oppressive elements in one's life that are illuminated by that understanding.

==== Critical university studies ====
Critical university studies is a field examining the role of higher education in contemporary society and its relation to culture, politics, and labor. Arising primarily from cultural studies, it applies critical theory toward the university since the 1970s, particularly the shift away from a strong public model of higher education to a neoliberal privatized model. Emerging largely in the United States, which has the most extensive system of higher education, the field has also seen significant work in the United Kingdom, as well as in other countries where neoliberalism is or is becoming an important societal and political force. Key themes of CUS research are corporatization, academic labor, and student debt, among other issues.

=== Critical psychology ===
Critical psychology is a perspective on psychology that draws extensively on critical theory. Critical psychology challenges the assumptions, theories and methods of mainstream psychology and attempts to apply psychological understandings in different ways.

=== Critical criminology ===
Critical criminology applies critical theory to criminology. Critical criminology examines the genesis of crime and the nature of justice in relation to power, privilege, and social status. These include factors such as class, race, gender, and sexuality. Legal and penal systems are understood to reproduce and uphold systems of social inequality. Additionally, critical criminology works to uncover possible biases within traditional criminological research.

=== Critical animal studies ===
Critical animal studies (CAS) is an academic sub-discipline that critically examines human relationships with nonhuman animals, with a focus on social justice and animal liberation. Challenging the conventional anthropocentric views of humans toward animals, it recognizes the inherent value of nonhuman animals. It aims to create a more equitable and ethical relationship between humans and other animals. CAS applies critical theory to animal studies and animal ethics. It emerged in 2001 with the founding of the Centre for Animal Liberation Affairs by Anthony J. Nocella II and Steven Best, which in 2007 became the Institute for Critical Animal Studies (ICAS). The core interest of CAS is animal ethics, firmly grounded in trans-species intersectionality, environmental justice, social justice politics and critical analysis of the underlying role played by the capitalist system. Scholars in the field seek to integrate academic research with political engagement and activism.

=== Critical social work ===
Critical social work is the application to social work of a critical theory perspective. Critical social work seeks to address social injustices, as opposed to focusing on individualized issues. Critical theories explain social problems as arising from various forms of oppression and injustice in globalized capitalist societies and forms of neoliberal governance. This approach to social work theory is formed by a polyglot of theories from across the humanities and social sciences, borrowing from various schools of thought, including anarchism, anti-capitalism, anti-racism, Marxism, feminism, biopolitics, and social democracy.

=== Critical ethnography ===
Critical ethnography is an approach to ethnography based on critical theory. It focuses on the implicit values expressed within ethnographic studies and, therefore, on the unacknowledged biases that may result from such implicit values. It has been called critical theory in practice. In the spirit of critical theory, this approach seeks to determine symbolic mechanisms, to extract ideology from action, and to understand the cognition and behaviour of research subjects within historical, cultural, and social frameworks.

=== Critical data studies ===
Critical data studies is the exploration of and engagement with social, cultural, and ethical challenges that arise when working with big data. It is through various unique perspectives and taking a critical approach that this form of study can be practiced. As its name implies, critical data studies draws heavily on the influence of critical theory, which has a strong focus on addressing the organization of power structures. This idea is then applied to the study of data.

=== Critical environmental justice ===
Critical environmental justice applies critical theory to environmental justice.

== Criticism ==
=== Marxist Criticism ===
While critical theorists have often been called Marxist intellectuals, owing to its genealogical descent from a Gramscian analysis of the superstructure, many critical theorists have abandoned key Marxist concepts, such as dialectical materialism, class conflict and the base and superstructure; and rejected Marxist empiricist, positivist and post-positivist analytical traditions. Critical theory also combined Marxian analysis with other sociological and philosophical traditions, such as Post-Structuralism in the vein of Jacques Derrida and Michel Foucault, which has resulted in accusations of revisionism by Orthodox Marxist and by Marxist–Leninist philosophers. In particular, critical theory's antipositivist merging of analysis with praxis reifies the analysis of identity and ontologizes it; as in order to act on the premise of identity requires that identity is not treated as a social construct but as a real essence. Furthermore, whilst class position is a social relation that can be abolished by revising economic relations, critical theory's focus on identity cannot be meaningfully transcended in a similar way, especially if one treats identity as a real category to be operationalized on. Thus Marxists find Critical Theory to be a profoundly particularist and anti-universalist set of theories, with a moral conflict defined on identity, in contrast to the universalist nature of Marxism. This has led to criticism that Critical Theory functions as a "left-wing" manifestation of Carl Schmitt's ontological friend-enemy distinction

=== Liberal Criticism ===
Martin Jay has said that the first generation of critical theory is best understood not as promoting a specific philosophical agenda or ideology, but as "a gadfly of other systems".

Critical theory has been criticized for not offering any clear road map to political action (praxis), often explicitly repudiating any solutions. Those objections mostly apply to first-generation Frankfurt School, while the issue of politics is addressed in a much more assertive way in contemporary theory.

Another criticism of critical theory "is that it fails to provide rational standards by which it can show that it is superior to other theories of knowledge, science, or practice." Rex Gibson argues that critical theory suffers from being cliquish, conformist, elitist, immodest, anti-individualist, naive, too critical, and contradictory. Hughes and Hughes argue that Habermas' theory of ideal public discourse "says much about rational talkers talking, but very little about actors acting: Felt, perceptive, imaginative, bodily experience does not fit these theories".

Some feminists argue that critical theory "can be as narrow and oppressive as the rationalization, bureaucratization, and cultures they seek to unmask and change.

Critical theory's language has been criticized as being too dense to understand, although "Counter arguments to these issues of language include claims that a call for clearer and more accessible language is anti-intellectual, a new 'language of possibility' is needed, and oppressed peoples can understand and contribute to new languages."

Bruce Pardy, writing for the National Post, argues that critical theory often falls into the mistake of Circular reasoning, because any challenges to the "legitimacy [of critical theory] can be interpreted as a demonstration of the [critical theorists'] thesis: the assertion of reason, logic and evidence is a manifestation of privilege and power. Thus, any challenger risks the stigma of a bigoted oppressor."

Robert Danisch, writing for The Conversation, argued that critical theory, and the modern humanities more broadly, focus too much on criticizing the current world rather than trying to make a better world.

== See also ==
- Modernism
- Antipositivism
- Critical military studies
- Cultural studies
- Grievance studies affair
- Information criticism
- Marxist cultural analysis
- Outline of critical theory
- Popular culture studies
- Outline of organizational theory
- Postcritique
- Quare theory
- Standpoint epistemology

=== Lists ===
- List of critical theorists
- List of works in critical theory

=== Journals ===
- Constellations
- Representations
- Critical Inquiry
- Telos
- Law and Critique
