= Critical terrorism studies =

Application of critical theory

Critical terrorism studies (CTS) applies a critical theory approach rooted in counter-hegemonic and politically progressive critical theory to the study of terrorism. With links to the Frankfurt School of critical theory and the Aberystwyth School of critical security studies, CTS seeks to understand terrorism as a social construction, or a label, that is applied to certain violent acts through a range of political, legal and academic processes. It also seeks to understand and critique dominant forms of counter-terrorism.

== Description ==
Following the terrorist attacks of September 11, 2001; there has been a massive increase in research related to terrorism. Terrorism has become one of the most powerful signifiers in contemporary Western society with the term generating vast amounts of social and political activity. It has also become a cultural taboo which invokes emotions – fear and hatred. CTS takes issue with previous terrorism studies in what it perceives as having methodological and analytical weaknesses, including a reliance on poor research methods and procedures, an overreliance on secondary resources, and a failure to undertake primary research; a failure to come up with an accepted definition of terrorism, and an inability to be cross-disciplinary. According to Jeroen Gunning: "core epistemological, methodological and political-normative problems persist, ranging from lack of conceptual clarity and theoretical sterility to political bias and a continuing dearth of primary research data". CTS is a response to these research problems. With its origins in the Frankfurt School of critical theory, and the Welsh School of critical security studies (in which the primary referent to be secured is individuals not states), CTS is a self-reflective, critical approach to the study of terrorism which challenges the ontological, epistemological and ideological commitments of mainstream terrorism scholars. CTS also looks to attract academics from other disciplines who are uncomfortable with the mainstream discourse around terrorism and looks to engage directly with those who are perceived as 'terrorists' and/or terrorist sympathisers.

CTS aims to approach terrorism studies from a critical angle, that is, to encourage and further the adoption of a more self-consciously critical approach to the study of terrorism. However CTS does not only criticise the state of terrorism studies, it also attempts to "suggest an alternative way of studying terrorism and a concrete research agenda for the future". While critical approaches to the study of terrorism are not new, previous efforts have often occurred outside of the terrorism studies field. Such as the critical approach that some anthropology scholars have taken. These alternative approaches have "had little cross-fertilization with the orthodox field and have largely failed to alter its practices, priorities, approaches, outputs and myths". CTS seeks to engage directly with the orthodox field, and question its normative assumptions. Prompted by the growing unease over the state of current terrorism research, and the relationship between much orthodox terrorism research and the institutions of state power, CTS sets out to "stimulate, encourage, and more clearly articulate the nascent but observable 'critical turn' that was starting to become visible within the broader terrorism studies field".

CTS scholars argue that terrorism should be de-exceptionalised as a form of political violence, not singled out as a unique form of "evil" violence, but should be treated as other forms of political violence are. CTS also encourages researchers to engage with terrorists as humans, and not form explanations of terrorists in an 'Othering' sense. Therefore; "Ultimately, a critical approach to terrorism suggests that more positive and progressive change is always possible and that we can break out of seemingly endless cycles of terrorist/counter-terrorist violence, if only we can begin to think, study, speak and act outside of the dominant terrorism paradigm."

== History ==
CTS's antecedents lie with academics such as Noam Chomsky and Edward S. Herman, who published critical works relating to the state and terrorism from the late 1970s. One of the first major works that gave impetus to a CTS discourse was Joseba Zulaika and William Douglass's seminal work, Terror and Taboo: The Follies, Fables, and Faces of Terrorism. This book was a critical appraisal of many of the international community's commonly held assumptions about terrorism. A further catalyst for CTS came from Richard Jackson's 2005 book, Writing the War on Terrorism. Jackson called for scholars to resist the current terrorism studies discourse: "I believe we have an ethical duty to resist the discourse, to deconstruct it at every opportunity and continually to interrogate the exercise of power". The setting up of the Critical Studies on Terrorism Working Group (CSTWG) within the British International Studies Association (BISA) occurred in early 2006, while in October 2006, a conference was held entitled; 'Is it time for a critical terrorism studies?' This was followed by two journal articles that called for a critical appraisal of the current state of terrorism studies. Richard Jackson's "Introduction: The Case for Critical Terrorism Studies" and Jeroen Gunning's "A case for Critical Terrorism Studies". In his "A case for Critical Terrorism Studies", Gunning calls for a critical approach that will "encourage researchers to historicize and contextualize the conflict by looking at the evolution of violence, broader processes of radicalization, the relationship between violent organizations and wider social movements, and the relationship between social movements and the state."

The setting up of the journal Critical Studies in Terrorism occurred in early 2007. The idea behind launching the journal was "one small part of a much broader attempt to foster a more self-reflective, critical approach to the study of terrorism, and bring in those who study aspects of 'terrorism', but are uncomfortable with or hostile to the (perceived) ontological, epistemological, and ideological commitments of existing terrorism studies." CTS has continued to expand as a sub-discipline of terrorism studies and there has been a growth of CTS programs in universities such as Aberystwyth University, the University of Kent and the University of Manchester. Other courses also exist within peace studies and politics programmes in universities such as Otago University, Durham University, Georgetown University, Virginia Tech, University of Florida, and Queen's University Belfast. Routledge Handbooks published Critical Terrorism Studies in 2016.

== Ontological and epistemological foundations ==
=== Two ontological critical theories ===
- Critical realism: Observer and observed, or subject and object, are distinctly separate (For a clear alternative discussion on critical realism and CTS, see: Stump and Dixit 2013, 2011).
- Reflectivism: Observer and observed or subject and object are deeply interconnected (For a more reflective discourse see: Jackson, Javis, Gunning, Smyth 2009).

There has been a huge amount of academic discussion about the ontological and epistemological foundations of critical terrorism studies. Within CTS, there is a broad agreement on the need to examine terrorism and terrorists from a historical, contextualized perspective asking 'how' questions of causation and constitution, rather than the more orthodox problem solving questions of a single isolated event. For instance, CTS questions why a terrorist action happens, asking whether the terrorists simply hate western notions of freedom, or whether they have deeper underlying political motivations? CTS adopts the ontological position that "terrorism" is fundamentally a social fact rather than brute fact.

=== Epistemological perspective ===
- Critical realism: best approximation to objective world.
- Reflexivism: tool for inducing self-reflection of individuals and groups. Not static and monolithic.

CTS adopts the epistemological position that the nature of knowledge in terrorism studies is a social process which relies on contextual factors, including the influence of the researcher. CTS scholars argue that by being continuously aware of context, social processes, and the 'known' and 'unknown' knowledge in circulation, you can gain further insights into the study of terrorism. CTS also acknowledges the link between power and knowledge, and who research is ultimately for.

=== Overview of research areas ===
- With the focus on epistemological understanding, it is now possible to question how we receive knowledge and who it benefits and why.
- Examining the constructed information flow produced through academic research, basic education, political rhetoric, state and international law, and media. Reframing the discourse through a reflexive epistemology.
- Human security over state security/national security. Move away from state-centric policies on security, to focusing on people and liberty.
- Emancipation: whose voice is marginalized or silenced, whose voice is empowered in defining terrorism, and what should the response to it be in particular contexts?
- Gender: the misconception that typically women are seen as victims of political violence and men as perpetrators.
- Gendering serves to maintain gender hierarchy and reinforces essentialist stereotypes of women as peaceful and powerless. Reframing women's interaction with terrorism and violence.
- Study of political terror (violence), state terrorism, structural violence and cultural violence.
- Exploring the extent to which the status quo contributes to the problem of terrorism. "Whom defines terrorism? Whom defines terrorist? Whom defines the dominant response?".
- State terrorism and counter-terrorism: creating the conditions of oppositional violence. To analyse the way traditional terrorism discourse is used to discredit oppositional groups and justify state policies. The applying of historical materialist approaches to systematic research of state terrorism has started to be critically assessed by Michael Stohl, Noam Chomsky, Richard Jackson, Ruth Blakeley and others.

== Divergences from traditional terrorism studies ==
CTS differs from orthodox/traditional terrorism studies (OTS) in several fundamental ways. Some of the most significant points of difference include its emphasis on the utilization of critical theory in research, its focus on removing the bias of ethnocentrism from all research, its goal to facilitate the spread of emancipation of peoples previously marginalized in traditional terrorism studies, and its attempt to avoid political bias and a problem-solving policy-orientation.

=== Utilization of critical theory ===
Scholars created CTS in response to what they felt was missing from traditional terrorism studies, namely, the critical aspect of research. Employing critical thinking in terrorism research can mean employing any one of several existing critical theories (such as Derrida's deconstruction, Foucault's post-structuralism, or Althusser's structuralism, etc.) But, in a broader sense, it simply means researching and writing to challenge commonly held social, political, and personal beliefs about terrorism that often go unchallenged (specifically in traditional terrorism studies). OTS scholars agree that critical thinking and the utilization of critical theory should be a prominent aspect of any valuable research. However, they also feel that such research already exists within the field of terrorism studies and that CTS is bringing more of a critical eye to the field, but that there is no cause for it to be a whole separate sub-field. However, unlike traditional terrorism studies, CTS is strict on its adherence to the critical element of research, as it believes critical analysis is one of the few ways to overcome the problematic gaps within traditional terrorism studies. CTS also hopes that the critical element will also eventually bridge the traditional and critical approaches, if both begin to follow the research procedures that allow critical analysis.

=== Removing ethnocentrism ===
CTS attempts to combat what they feel is a prevalent state-centricity and ethnocentricity in traditional terrorism studies. Prominent scholars Jackson, Gunning and Smyth claim that since most research on terrorism is done by state-sponsored scholars and experts, there is a disproportionate amount of research articulating states' perspectives and experiences (namely western state-actors), leaving almost all non-state actors without any fair, unbiased representation in the research field. In response to this, CTS challenges state-centric or ethnocentric research by responding directly to already published research, finding holes and gaps in the arguments, and by completing new research that challenges ethnocentric claims and provides new claims from the perspective of non-state entities, and specifically, the perspectives of the so-labeled 'terrorists' themselves. OTS scholars see this shift from so-called "state centrism" as obvious and not wholly necessary. Bias is unavoidable and viewing it as such has the possibility to weaken arguments already made. Also, there is not a complete lack of ethnocentric-free research within terrorism studies and therefore CTS is seen as simply creating a bifurcation between the subfields. Despite this criticism, CTS remains determined to conduct research free from state-centric and ethnocentric perspectives, opening space for new perspectives and discourses that may have been overlooked by terrorism studies as a whole.

=== Facilitating the spread of emancipation ===
When referring to the emancipatory nature of research, CTS is referring not only to the emancipation of previously marginalized peoples' voices in the field of OTS, but the emancipation of ideas, questions and theories that have been marginalized, overlooked, or seen as non-issues in orthodox studies. A simple way to understand CTS's emancipation is to think of it as a process of creating space and discussion that allows the focus to be on experiences, ideas and questions which have been "neglected in most orthodox accounts of security and terrorism". The emancipation of ideas, dialogue, and experience is a powerful "philosophical anchorage" that allows CTS to separate itself and its motives from that of traditional and orthodox terrorism studies. Traditional terrorism studies theorists understand the value behind the idea of emancipatory nature of CTS's research, but many feel such a claim is overstated. CTS's claim of emancipation is seen as simply reinventing the wheel, a wheel that has been working effectively for orthodox scholars for decades. And the claim to be the first in a field as politically charged and somewhat emotionally delicate as terrorism studies to ask hard questions and challenge commonly held beliefs and assumptions is seen as a gross over-simplification and generalization that risks replacing one dominant discourse with another, and in turn, marginalizing the research and voices of traditional terrorism studies. Further, criticism has been levied at this "emancipatory agenda" by virtue of its seeming lack of recourse for the "Heterogeneity of the human experience." Despite traditional terrorism studies' negative response to CTS's emancipatory claim, CTS still strives to keep emancipation as one of its core motivations for continued research. Emancipatory research in terrorism studies can bring to light overlooked perspectives such as the war in Iraq being a form of occupation bringing more violence than peace, the idea that State sponsored research is often biased and unreliable and that any and all valuable research should be conducted free of political bias to truly increase understanding. These few listed ideas are examples of what CTS hopes to bring to the field of terrorism studies through emancipatory research.

=== Freedom from policy ===
One of the largest voids of orthodox terrorism studies CTS aims to fill is the void of politically neutral and policy-free research and ideas. Post-9/11, almost all research on terrorism has been sponsored and conducted by state-actors, many standing to gain politically from the conclusions drawn from such research. CTS feels that the prominent discourse maintained by state-sponsored terrorism research contributes to the justification of state terrorism and de-legitimizes any argument that would challenge or condemn such actions. Also, when research is sponsored for political reasons, the 'experts' become not those who have the most relevant experience, but those who are willing to support whatever political view that will result in more funding, and those who are willing to adhere to any current policy around terrorism (e.g. "Our country does not negotiate with terrorists" therefore all research reflects the impossibility of negotiating with terrorist).

Orthodox terrorism studies researchers see the idea of political and policy neutral research as a nice sentiment, but impossible to execute. Many have criticized CTS for claiming policy free and politically neutral research, as even the word terrorism itself is not free of any political meaning and connotation. And since many scholars study and research the causes, effects, and nature of terrorism because of passionate ideas and interests, it would be irresponsible to assert that simply because a piece of research is free of state centricism and bias that it is automatically politically neutral. Again, traditional terrorism studies sees CTS's research attempts as oversimplifications to claim innovation in an already established field.

However, CTS sees the criticism from orthodox scholars as extenuating the need for there to be more than one avenue of academic discourse available. By aiming to keep all research politically neutral and policy free, a space opens up for experts with non-state experience to enter a field which was previously unavailable to them. And again, politically neutral scholars are more able to bring to attention and help fight acts of state terrorism that are often overlooked and even justified in orthodox studies. There are however some questions over how CTS can be both politically neutral and emancipatory.

=== Traditional terrorism studies' response ===
CTS's new approach and perspective has been widely welcomed in the field of terrorism studies. Nevertheless, it has been subject to criticism for its desire to distinguish itself from what it deems "traditional" or "orthodox" terrorism studies, and for its claim of maintaining absolute political neutrality. However, scholars both from critical and traditional terrorism studies remain determined not to allow any distinction between the subfields to cause bifurcation and incompatibility within the field of research itself.

== CTS's main critiques of traditional terrorism studies ==
CTS would not have come into existence unless scholars saw the need for a change in many of the perspectives within terrorism studies as a whole. Some of the most common criticisms CTS consistently presents include the inconsistent 'definition' of terrorism, the political power held by most orthodox scholars, the ineffectiveness of the war on terror, the glorification of patriotism, and the demonising narrative of the 'enemy'.

=== Definitions of terrorism ===
The term "terrorism" gained prominence during the French Revolution when it was used by the Jacobins to kill known supporters of the Ancien Régime, and to eliminate those labeled enemies of the revolution. Moving into the twentieth century, the regimes of Nazi Germany and Soviet Russia, through the use of secret police, used tension to subdue and kill those deemed enemies of the state. Further, a number of Latin American states backed by the US utilised state-terrorism to silence the population and consolidate their control – Chile and Nicaragua in particular. Up until this point, terrorism was largely, though not exclusively, defined by its use by state. And it was not until later that academic circles shifted the focus to non-state actors. There is research to suggest that states that have witnessed severe upheaval throughout their history will utilise state-terrorism. Such as Iraq, Syria, Israel, Burundi, Rwanda, Zaire, Myanmar, Indonesia, Serbia and Chechnya. Furthermore, for weak states, state terrorism is often viewed as a legitimate total state consolidation.

Terrorism therefore has a number of meanings and interpretations that we can use to assess terrorist acts in the contemporary era. Terrorism is a heavily contested concept and it is the context in which a violent act occurs as to how people define the act. It is symbolic violence, a communicative act, with the sole purpose to send the message. It is the psychological effect of using fear, as it is not the victims of a terrorist act. But the wider audience who are the target, because the victims become instrumental as they are the message carriers.

- Generic terrorism: "The systematic use of violence and intimidation to coerce a government or community, into acceding to specific political demands." It is the use of or the threat of violence that is meant to intimidate a wider target than the immediate victims of terrorism.
- Non-state terrorism: Involves attacks on civilians, symbolic and random targets and is usually, though not exclusively, aimed at bringing about political change.
- Religious terrorism: Political violence in the name of religion by religiously motivated people. A problematic term that is used to categorise terrorism and differentiate it from other forms of terrorism, by assuming there is a causal relationship between religion and violence, rather than looking at the study of beliefs and practices in the production of political violence.
- State terrorism: Involves the intimidation of the civilian population into submission. This occurs when a third-party is used to silence dissidents, and kill people, instilling fear in the population.

=== Links to power ===
A CTS critique of OTS revolves around many OTS scholars' links to institutions of power. CTS questions these links to hegemonic actors and structures from the global North that can be seen to be furthering the agendas of certain states, because OTS is a discipline that is primarily concerned with looking at acts of terrorism by non-state actors. This is a very state-centric perspective which has a limited set of assumptions and narratives about the nature and cause of terrorism. Moreover, this becomes accepted as the general consensus at the macro, meso and micro levels of government and institutions, and is reflected in policy and the way the mainstream view terrorism. Traditional terrorism studies is also largely concerned with "problem solving theory", which looks at the world "with the prevailing social and power relationships and the institutions into which they are organised, as the given framework for action", and then works to "make these relationships and institutions work smoothly by dealing effectively with particular sources of trouble". Therefore, they look at dealing with the issue of terrorism within the current dominant structures of power. An example of this is the scholars and associated research that is affiliated with the RAND Corporation. Now an independent think tank, RAND was established by the US air force in 1945, and was contracted to the Douglas Aircraft Company. It has maintained close links with US administrations, and former board members include Donald Rumsfeld and Condoleezza Rice, both leading members of the George W. Bush administration. The major problem with this association with government is that it privileges research on threats by non-state actors, and marginalises research around state sponsorship of terrorism. According to Burnett and Whyte, the Corporation acts "effectively as an influential prestigious voice in the American military-industrial lobby and in world politics; particularly with regard to its interventions on the war on terror". Scholars, or "embedded experts" associated with RAND have key editorial positions in the two most prominent English-language terrorism journals, Terrorism and Political Violence and Conflict and Terrorism. RAND scholars helped to found the St Andrew Centre for Studies in Terrorism and Political Violence (CSTPV), the leading centre for the study of terrorism in the UK. As well, experts associated with the RAND-St Andrews nexus have significant professional ties with businesses and military personnel associated with counter-terrorism activity, many of which have made "windfall profits" in the Iraq conflict.

== The war on terror ==
On 11 September 2001, 19 terrorists – in association with Al-Qaeda – hijacked four commercial planes and flew them into the Twin Towers of the World Trade Center in New York City, The Pentagon in Arlington County, Virginia, and a field near Stonycreek Township, Somerset County, Pennsylvania. The number of deaths is estimated at 2996 casualties. In the following days, President George W. Bush declared a war on terror to prevent any more terrorist attacks on the Western world. Bush immediately framed these terrorists as being motivated by Islamic extremism; an evil, destructive and repressive people who America refused to negotiate with and must defeat (45). The estimates of how many thousands of civilians, insurgents, soldiers (both American and otherwise) and Islamists that have been killed in the war on terror vary widely from 220,000 to 650,000. However these statistics are unreliable due to their varied date, source and amount – it is not possible to know how many people have been victims of the war on terror. Not only has this war killed, tortured and displaced hundreds of thousands of people, there is no proof that it has been effective in reducing terrorism, and has led to a further proliferation of terrorist attacks.

=== The Bush Doctrine ===
The rationality behind Bush's decision to start a war on terrorism comes in four parts. First it was implemented as a preventive war, and as an excuse to act pre-emptively. Second, it was based on unilateralism, although where necessary, Bush attempted to enlist support from the international community. Third, there was an element of idealism that believed that war would help to spread democracy, human rights and liberties. And lastly, Bush endeavoured to maintain American hegemony by reaffirming the vital role of American military strength. It is argued that the negative effects of this war will be felt for generations, due to the culture of division, stereotyping and hate between the Middle East and the West. The formation of a new "suspect community" in the Middle East has undermined human rights and civil liberties, and impaired the functionality of the international system. Just war theory stands as the main justification for the war on terror. This means that new technologies and methods in war are legalized. The 2003 invasion of Iraq is viewed by many CTS scholars as an act of terror. Terror on terror makes no sense, and did not produce positive results. The attack on Iraq was illogical considering America's past partnership with Iraq, the whereabouts of Al-Qaeda's base and Osama bin Laden in Afghanistan, and also the men who attacked the twin towers were from Saudi Arabia. American power internationally meant that they authorized the attacks in Iraq and Afghanistan, and also drone strikes in Pakistan, Yemen and Somalia. While Bush legitimises the enemy by asserting that terrorists want to 'kill all Americans', there is no discernable difference between this falsified aim and the goal of American Military intervention in the Middle East. Barack Obama has continued the Bush-instigated War on Terror by plainly stating that the biggest threat to America is still terrorism. So, despite the reduction of military occupation in the Middle East, the trace of War on Terror still remains.

=== Counter-insurgency failures ===
The overall ineffective and illegitimate result of the war on terror means that the costs have thus far outweighed the successes. Counter-terrorism efforts such as Targeted killing and drone strikes have backfired and are not proven to work, and have even perpetuated the number of terrorist attacks, including suicide bombings. While counter-terrorism may deter some attacks, it cannot prevent all, and often has the result of provoking rather than reducing terrorism. The Iraq War was not productive in countering terrorism. Upward of 60 examples of terrorist incidents in America are proven consequences of United States foreign policy and military intervention. Still, no academic scholar in orthodox terrorism studies has considered American military intervention as the primary problem. It is noted that at Faisal Shahzad's trial – following his failed 2010 Times Square car bombing attempt – he cited the drones that were killing the people of his community as the reason for his vengeance. Unmanned drone attacks in Afghanistan and Pakistan tend to target public places and gatherings, such as weddings and funerals, and are increasing the threat of terrorism. Violence emanates and results from counterinsurgency/terrorism. What America calls preventative war, the Middle East calls state terrorism.

=== The War on Terror and patriotism ===
Throughout American history, military strength has been at the heart of identity; it is embedded in politics and culture. War as a solution is rooted in American culture, as The War of Independence and World War II are referred to as successes and justifications for future war. Rather than concentrating resources and money on problems that have widespread negative effects on American society, like poverty, education, health or the environment, the United States has spent US$1.283 trillion since 9/11 on military interventions internationally. The stereotype of the enemy is perpetuated and normalized through American culture, media, entertainment and politics. And the shared hate for the enemy contributes to a unified patriotism within America that deflects attention from the deeply entrenched inequalities within the nation. The war on terror acts as a distraction mechanism from local problems in the Western world, and maintains a war culture of its own that produces justifications and legitimate rationality for prolonging the war in the Middle East. The patriotism that the war on terror creates contributes to large sources of revenue for the American military industrial economy through mass surveillance, weapon suppliers, the CIA, military personnel and orthodox terrorism academics.

=== Creating a narrative of the enemy ===
The culture of war is created through the imagery and language used in politics and popular entertainment in order to frame a narrative of the enemy. Islam and Muslims have been constructed as a dangerous other in Western culture. Not only do politicians – especially in the United States, Britain, Australia and New Zealand – inform the public of this enemy, this fictional reality is reinforced through journalism and entertainment in which the war is framed as inevitable and the enemy as evil. This all reinforces the fantasy that this war is about fighting evil in general, and the Western soldiers that are killed are fighting for a greater good. The hyperbolic, dramatic language used in the media casts the Western world as heroes who fight the villains. CTS reflects on who this narrative of the enemy benefits. This perception that reinforces patriotism and justifications for war, profits the Western world and furthers the dominance and oppression that divides the two regions. When the motives and ideology of terrorists are largely unknown – let alone the number and whereabouts – the greater the possibility is to rely on stereotype and myth-based discourse. Because the enemy is foreign (even alien) this possibility is increased due to limited knowledge and physical connection to the region. When reality falls short, the narrative of foreign peoples is shaped by "shortcuts provided by stylized imagery compounded of stories, films and our own imaginations". Politicians use this to back up their dehumanized claims, so the image of the terrorist mimics Osama bin Laden with the beard, turban, black eyes and hollow glum face creating a stereotyped stigma. This enemy is merciless, believes in extreme religious values and will do anything to destroy the West. Such imagery and language degrades common humanity, and prevents us from understanding that the enemy is a human who is victimized.

=== Terrorism and mobilities ===
John Urry was a pioneer in discussing the paradigms of mobilities within the age of terror. Per his viewpoint, terrorism operates in a world of contrasting complexities where the power, far from being static, flows. The power is mobile in the same way, its gravity-effects on the world of consumption. Terrorism divides the world in two safe and unsafe zones. Over past decades, many voices alerted on the negative effects of terrorism over the industry of tourism and mobilities in developed and underdeveloped economies. The emergent theories explained terrorism as an indicator of the lack of democracy, or even extreme poverty which represents a fertile ground for ethnic resentment necessary to rechannel terrorism. Since tourists are ambassadors of first World, not surprisingly they were targets of terrorist cells in zones dotted with lower levels of security. However, some other scholars questioned this idea considering that tourism recovers its attraction and growth after elapsed little time from the original event; or even producing "traumaescape" which means zones whipped by terrorism that becomes tourist attractions. Some sociological studies focus on the concept of Thana-Tourism or Dark tourism to denote a connection of terrorism and tourist consumption.
