= Nigerian Library Association Anambra State Chapter =

Nigerian Library

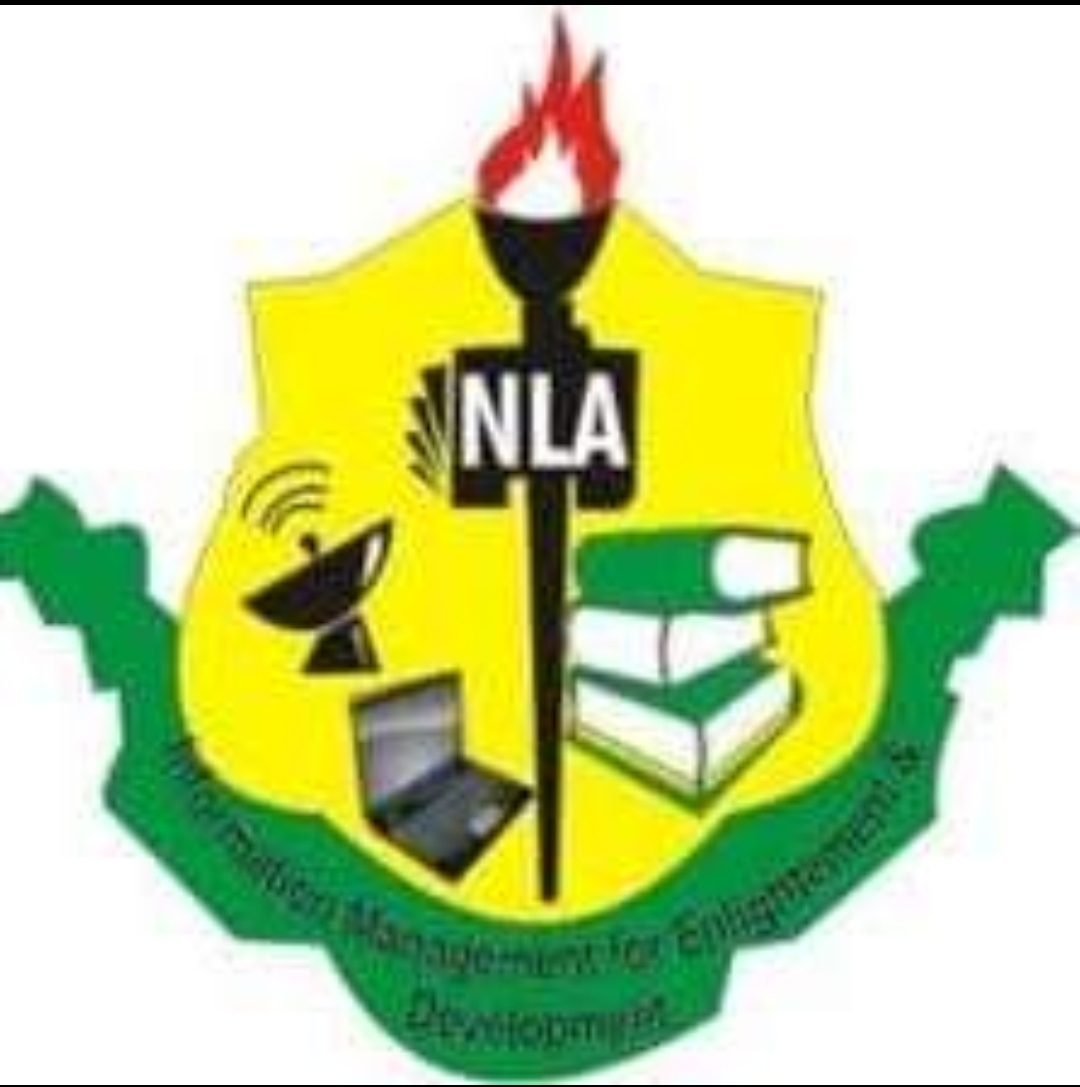
Logo for Nigerian Library Association (NLA)

Nigerian Library Association (NLA), Anambra State Chapter is one of the 37 chapters of the Nigerian Library Association (NLA) with its headquarters in Abuja. It is a recognized group of librarians in Nigeria. The State chapter is made up of librarians working in library schools, public libraries, school libraries, government libraries, special libraries, and other library sectors in Anambra State, Nigeria. NLA, Anambra State Chapter won the Best State Chapter Award of the Nigerian Library Association for three consecutive years. These were in 2009, 2010, and 2011 and these earned it the "Evergreen Award." The State Chapter is located within Professor Kenneth Dike State Central e-Library Awka. However, some of the challenges of the State Chapter include non-payment of membership subscriptions by members, non-attendance of chapter meetings, and non-identification of retired members to the chapter.

== Conferences ==
The NLA, Anambra State Chapter holds its annual Conference and Annual General Meeting. The conferences were initially taking place at the Auditorium of Paul University, Awka. Currently, the conferences are now held at Professor Kenneth Dike State Central e-Library, Awka, Anambra State. The conference activities include the presentation of papers and social activities. In 2020, the State Chapter started producing a "Compendium of Papers" where all the papers accepted and presented at the annual conference were published with peer-reviewed.

=== Conference themes ===
- 2016: Equitable Quality Education and Learning Opportunity for Sustainable Development: The Role of the Library.
- 2017: Library; Sharing knowledge For Development.
- 2019: Library for the National Digital Agenda.
- 2020: Libraries for All: Expansive, Engaging and Inspiring Information Services for National Development.
- 2021: Innovative Digital Practices: Transforming Libraries for Information Services Sustainability.
- 2022: Library Engagement for Sustainable Digital Society.

== Publications ==
Nigerian Library Association (NLA) Anambra State Chapter publishes Conference Compendium, Journal and Documentary They are:

=== Conference Compendium ===
- Nigerian Library Association (NLA) Anambra State Chapter (2020). Libraries for All: Expansive, Engaging and Inspiring Information Services for National Development. 2020 Conference and Annual General Meeting of the Nigerian Library Association, Anambra State Chapter. Held in Professor Kenneth Dike State Central e-Library, Awka, Nigeria, 1 & 2 December 2020. ISBN 978-978-986-080-7
- Nigerian Library Association (NLA) Anambra State Chapter (2021). Innovative Digital Practices: Transforming Libraries for Information Services Sustainability. 2021 Conference and Annual General Meeting of the Nigerian Library Association, Anambra State Chapter. Held in Professor Kenneth Dike State Central e-Library, Awka, Nigeria, 1 & 2 December 2021, p. 109. ISBN 978-978-999-222-5
- Nigerian Library Association (NLA) Anambra State Chapter (2022). Library Engagement for Sustainable Digital Society. 2022 Conference and Annual General Meeting of the Nigerian Library Association, Anambra State Chapter. Held in Professor Kenneth Dike State Central e-Library, Awka, Nigeria, 30 November - 1 December 2022. ISBN 978-978-797-195-6

=== Journals ===
The State Chapter also publishes a scholarly journal that is peer-reviewed titled "Library and Information Science Digest." The journal features articles that border on librarianship and other aspects of information science. It is licensed under the Creative Commons Attribution 4.0 International (CC BY 4.0).

The journal publication of the state chapter started in 2007 with the name “Anambra State Library and Information Science Digest.” Then in 2011, it changed its name to “Library and Information Science Digest” when it published its 5th volume. Currently, the State Chapter Journal now operates online publications, bringing the maiden hardcopy publication of 2007 and the following editions to the online archive. The Journals are:

- Journal of Nigerian Library Association, Anambra State Chapter: Anambra State Library and Information Science Digest. Vol 1. No 1 (2007). ISSN 2672-4820, 2006-1463
- Journal of Nigerian Library Association, Anambra State Chapter: Anambra State Library and Information Science Digest. Vol 2 No 1 (2008). ISSN 2672-4820, 2006-1463
- Journal of Nigerian Library Association, Anambra State Chapter: Anambra State Library and Information Science Digest. Vol 3 No 1 (2009
- Journal of Nigerian Library Association, Anambra State Chapter: Anambra State Library and Information Science Digest. Vol 4 No 1 (2010)
- Journal of Nigerian Library Association, Anambra State Chapter: Anambra State Library and Information Science Digest. Vol 5 No 1 (2011)
- Journal of Nigerian Library Association, Anambra State Chapter: Anambra State Library and Information Science Digest. Vol 6 No 1 (2012)
- Journal of Nigerian Library Association, Anambra State Chapter: Anambra State Library and Information Science Digest. Vol 7 No 1 (2014)
- Journal of Nigerian Library Association, Anambra State Chapter: Anambra State Library and Information Science Digest. Vol 8 No 1 (2015)
- Journal of Nigerian Library Association, Anambra State Chapter: Anambra State Library and Information Science Digest. Vol 9 No 1 (2016)
- Journal of Nigerian Library Association, Anambra State Chapter: Anambra State Library and Information Science Digest. Vol 10 No 1 (2017)
- Journal of Nigerian Library Association, Anambra State Chapter: Anambra State Library and Information Science Digest. Vol 11 No 1 (2018)
- Journal of Nigerian Library Association, Anambra State Chapter: Anambra State Library and Information Science Digest. Vol 11 No 2 (2018)
- Journal of Nigerian Library Association, Anambra State Chapter: Anambra State Library and Information Science Digest. Vol 12 No 1 (2019)
- Journal of Nigerian Library Association, Anambra State Chapter: Anambra State Library and Information Science Digest. Vol 13 (2020)
- Journal of Nigerian Library Association, Anambra State Chapter: Anambra State Library and Information Science Digest. Vol 14 (2021)
- Journal of Nigerian Library Association, Anambra State Chapter: Anambra State Library and Information Science Digest. Vol 15 No 1 (2022)
- Journal of Nigerian Library Association, Anambra State Chapter: Anambra State Library and Information Science Digest.
- Vol 16 No 1 (2022)

=== Directory ===
In 2012, it produced a directory of all the librarians and libraries in Anambra state with their full bibliographic details.

== NLA, Anambra State Chapter and COVID-19 ==
The state chapter disseminated community information and awareness during COVID-19 pandemic in Anambra state. They covered the three senatorial zones with campaign and sensitization on staying safe from the pandemic. These campaigns took place in markets, motor parks, police barracks, and other public places. There was also a distribution of facemasks to the people during the activity.

== Collaboration ==
Nigerian Library Association, Anambra State Chapter has collaborated with other organizations in sharing information and facilitation. On World Cancer Day February 4, 2023, it collaborated with Wikimedia User Group Nigeria/Anambra Network with Development Initiative for Technology and Empowerment on cancer awareness. The event included learning about cancer, article creation, improving articles, adding photos, Wikidata, and translating articles. It took place in Awka, Anambra State.

== Achievements ==
NLA, Anambra State Chapter has achieved the following: Annual peer-reviewed online journal, Production of a Compendium of Papers and Annual General Meetings, Production of a Directory, Awards for Best State Chapter of the Nigerian Library Association (NLA) for three consecutive years, the establishment of a Secretariat at Professor Kenneth Dike State Central Library, Awka, members recipient of International and national awards.

== Chairpersons ==
List of Past Chairpersons of NLA, Anambra State Chapter"
Name	Tenure
Obiora Nwosu (Prof.)	1992-1998
Steve Ezennia (Dr.)	1999-2000
R.E.A. Nwana (Dr.)	2000-2004
C. O. Onebunne (Barr.)	2004-2008
Nkem Osuigwe (Dr.)	2009-2013
Ebele Anyaoku (Prof.)	2013-2017
Uju Nwafor-Orizu (Dr.)	2017-2019
S. N. Udeze (Dr.)	2019-2022
