= Hartmut Rosa =

German sociologist

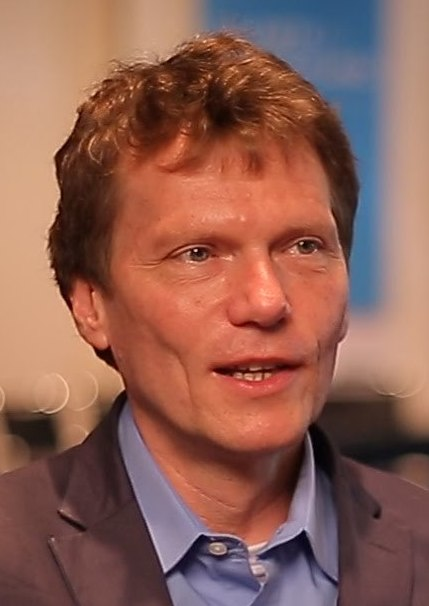
- Rosa in 2015
- Born: August 15, 1965 (age 61); Lörrach, West Germany

Academic background
- Education: Humboldt University of Berlin (PhD, 1997)
- Doctoral advisor: Axel Honneth
- Influences: Charles Taylor, Erich Fromm

Academic work
- Discipline: Sociology
- Institutions: University of Jena
- Notable works: Social Acceleration: A New Theory of Modernity (2013); Resonance: A Sociology of Our Relationship to the World (2016)

Hartmut Rosa (German: [ˈʁoːza]; born August 15, 1965) is a German sociologist and political scientist who is best known for his theory of resonance and temporal sociology of social acceleration.

== Life ==
Hartmut Rosa was born in Lörrach. He grew up in Grafenhausen in the Black Forest, where he spoke the local Alemannic German and played the organ in the Protestant parish. After graduating from the Hochrhein-Gymnasium in Waldshut, in 1985, and completing his civilian service, he began studying political science, philosophy and German studies at the University of Freiburg, where he graduated with honours in 1993. In 1997, he obtained a PhD summa cum laude from the Humboldt University of Berlin for his dissertation on political philosophy according to Charles Taylor.

Rosa worked as a research assistant at the chair of Political Science III at the University of Mannheim (1996–1997) and as a research assistant at the Institute for Sociology at the University of Jena (1997–1999). There, he habilitated with his study Social Acceleration: A New Theory of Modernity in the fields of Sociology and Political Science. During the summer semester of 2004, he held the deputy chair of Political Science/Political Theory at the University of Duisburg-Essen. During the winter semester 2004–2005 and the summer semester 2005, respectively, he held the deputy chair of political science at the Faculty of Philosophy and Social Sciences at the University of Augsburg. In 2005, Hartmut Rosa was appointed professor for General and Theoretical Sociology at the University of Jena.

In the winter of 1988–1989, he spent one semester with a scholarship of the German Academic Scholarship Foundation at the London School of Economics and Political Science. He visited the US for study purposes several times, including as a research assistant at the Department of Government/Center of European Studies at Harvard University. He received the Feodor Lynen Research Fellowship of the Alexander von Humboldt Foundation for his work as a visiting professor at the New School University in New York City in 2001–2002. He has been associated with the New School University as a visiting professor since 2002.

== Research ==
Rosa's research is focused on the areas of sociological diagnosis of time and the analysis of modernity, normative and empirical foundations of social criticism, subject and identity theories, sociology of time and theory of acceleration, as well as what he calls the "sociology of world relations". His books are received internationally and have been translated into 15 languages.

=== Social acceleration ===
Rosa's sociological work on time appears most prominently in his habilitation thesis “Social Acceleration: The Change in Temporal Structures”. Rosa argues that a “technically or economically” induced acceleration is evidenced in the rapid development of technology in the 19th and 20th centuries and the acceleration of social change. Through this work, Rosa argues that the history of modernity is simultaneously the history of accelerating change. The time-saving nature of technical progress leads to a time shortage rather than a gain of time. According to Rosa, the multitude of possibilities leads to the fact that a person can no longer exhaust the possibilities given to them in the course of their life. The "rate of increase exceeds the rate of acceleration", which leads to the fact that what has just been experienced is no longer up to date and individuals have no chance of dying "satisfied with life". Rosa uses the "slippery slope phenomenon" as a sociological counterpart to the biological Red Queen hypothesis: According to this, human beings must never – or rather can never – rest or be satisfied, because otherwise they would have to reckon with a loss or disadvantage. Rosa no longer sees any possibilities for humanity to control life, since the pace of acceleration has taken on a life of its own. Most recently, he has dealt in particular with the topos of desynchronisation, i.e. the increasing divergence of the time structures of various social sub-areas such as politics and the economy.

=== Resonance theory ===
With his monograph on resonance theory, Rosa presents an alternative concept to the omnipresence of alienation. Drafted within the framework of a "sociology of world relations", resonance theory elevates everyday experiences of successful, "resonant" connections to our world, and uses those as a critical groundwork. Rosa sees himself as continuing in the critical theory traditions of Erich Fromm. Although resonance is not something which can be strictly attained in a controlled, unidirectional or commodified sense, Rosa argues for a medio-passive approach, in which resonance is not actively sought, but where systems are proactive in creating the conditions for resonance.

=== Dignity of labour ===
In response to the "communitarianism debate": Rosa particularly advocates the "dignity of labour" and its social orientation and benefits for the common good, especially in reference to the topic of socio-ecological degrowth. He has further written several (introductory) texts on communitarian political and democratic theory, including his dissertation on the Canadian philosopher Charles Taylor.

=== Resource mobilization ===
Rosa's research on resource mobilization is based upon the question which mobilisation resources of civic engagement are resultant from the general development of modern society. He also analyses which political views are more likely to result in voluntary or civic engagement. According to Rosa, identification with the state ("my country") generates a moral obligation to ensure that this state acts accordingly. In order to be able to guarantee this, the individual must commit themselves to their personal socio-political engagement.

=== Metatheory of the social sciences ===
The metatheory of the social sciences from a history of ideas perspective: In doing so, Rosa emphasises the merits of the so-called Cambridge School, whose members have, in his eyes, "sharpened the awareness of methodological questions and theoretical presuppositions in dealing with the history of ideas and, in the process, opened up a fruitful methodological discussion". Rosa calls for a questioning of political theories with regard to their content and impact. This intends examining the contexts of tradition and discourse as well as normative or ideological implications, in which he sees the central concern of a critical conceptual history. This research focus combines his previous thematic fields. Rosa seeks new connections between current social theory (through time-diagnostic analysis) and a normative, critical social philosophy, whose foundations he sees in the nexus of "considerations of politics, identity and modernity theory".

== Reception ==
Rosa's work has gathered significant attention from a diverse range of influential scholars. As of 2023 there is a growing secondary literature engaged with his publications.

Literary theorist Rita Felski, one of the leading scholars of the postcritique movement, has advocated for resonance theory as a rubric for education which would allow practitioners to celebrate both aesthetic appreciation and critical theory as powerful sources of resonance, rather than diametrically opposed approaches to analysis. Felski argues that the idea of resonance “pushes back against regimes of accounting in the contemporary university: the ubiquitous rhetoric of metrics, impact factors, and citation indexes”, all areas which overlook the act of learning as something with is self-transformative and brings together “cognition and emotional, analysis and affect” whose “outcomes cannot be known in advance.”

Psychologist Svend Brinkmann has stated that Rosa's sociology of world relations invites us not to “reduce our relationship to the world to one of active agents that use passive resources as this easily mirrors the experiences of alienation in modernity.” Brinkmann proposes that cultural psychology should do more to take patients’ accounts of world relations and resonance more seriously.

However, Rosa's critics have questioned Rosa's optimistic turn away from Theodor Adorno's work on the perpetuity of alienation, which they argue is a major departure from the central aims of critical theory. Micha Brumlik questions the specificity of concepts such as resonance and sees in it the end of a critical theory founded on “looking coldly at society.” Rosa notes how some have described resonance as having reactionary tendencies, though he reports “it’s very clear they are not ... because I don’t try to preserve any tradition, and I certainly don’t want to say something has to be [that way] because it was like that in the past."

== Awards ==
- 2006: research award by State of Thuringia
- 2016: Tractatus Award
- 2018: Erich Fromm Prize
- 2018: Paul Watzlawick Ring of Honor (German: Paul-Watzlawick-Ehrenring)
- 2019: Honorary degree Universiteit voor Humanistiek, Utrecht
- 2019: Patronage of the UNESCO chair "Pratiques de la philosophie avec les enfants" as successor to Michel Serres at the Université de Nantes
- 2020: Werner Heisenberg Medal by Alexander von Humboldt Foundation
- 2020: Rob Rhoads Global Citizenship Education Award from the University of California
- 2020: member of the Academia Europaea
- 2021: together with Klaus Dörre and Stephan Lessenich the Thuringian Research Prize in the category basic research
