= Ebele Anyaoku =

Prof. Ebele Anyaoku
- Born: 2nd September, 1968
- Citizenship: Nigeria
- Occupations: Library services and research
- Children: 2

Academic background
- Education: BA in Arts in English/Library Science; Master's Degree in Library, Archival and Information Studies and PhD in Library and Information Science
- Alma mater: University of Nigeria, Nsukka; Nnamdi Azikiwe University Awka; University of Ibadan

Academic work
- Discipline: Library and Information Science
- Institutions: Nnamdi Azikiwe University Awka
- Notable works: Librarians Conceptions of Information Literacy in Three Federal Universities in South East Nigeria: Implications for Effective Implementations of Information Literacy Programmes; Data Librarianship: Open Data Awareness, Perceptions and Services in Medical Libraries in Nigeria; Determinants of Health Information Use for Self-Efficacy in Lifestyle Modification for Chronic Disease Patients; Librarians Use of Information Literacy Strategic Tools for Teaching Students in Nigeria Universities to Combat Fake News and Misinformation

Ebele Anyaoku (born September, 2 1968) is an academic, researcher and librarian. She is a Professor of Library and Information Science. She was the University Librarian of University of Abuja, Federal Capital Territory, Abuja from April 2021 to 2026 on a single tenure service of five years.

== Early life and education ==
Prof. Ebele Anyaoku is from Ojoto community in Idemili South local government area of Anambra South Senatorial District. Anambra State Nigeria. She attended Queens School Enugu and obtained her West African Examination Certificate (WAEC). She went to University of Nigeria Nsukka (UNN) and graduated with BA in Arts in English/Library Science. She also did her Master's Degree in Library, Archival and Information Studies in University of Ibadan. She obtained her PhD in Library and Information Science from Nnamdi Azikiwe University Awka, Nigeria. She is married and has 2 children.

== Career ==
Prof. Anyaoku was appointed the University Librarian, Abuja on April 12, 2021. She is listed in the NUC document as one of the full Professors in Nigerian University System. She is a grant recipient of the 2019 MLA Librarians without Borders Elsevier Foundation/Research4Life International Award. She is the Nnamdi Azikiwe University institutional representative for the Research4Life/HINARI program.

=== Editorship ===
She became the College Librarian of the College of Health Sciences, Nnamdi Azikiwe University, Nnewi Campus. She was also the Chairman of Nigerian Library Association (NLA), Anambra State Chapter and the editor of Library Digest, the Journal of the Nigeria Library Association (NLA), Anambra State Chapter. Prof. Anyaoku was the Editor in Chief of International Journal of Knowledge Dissemination (IJKD). A publication of Samuel O. Ogbemudia Library, University of Abuja, Nigeria. She is the Editor of UNIZIK Journal of Research in Library and Information Science. She was the past Editor in Chief of the Journal of Health Information, the official Journal of Medical Library Association of Nigeria. A publication of the Medical Library Association of Nigeria.

She is the consulting editor of the International Journal of Studies in Education is a multidisciplinary journal. She was the principal contact/Editor-in-Chief Journal of Health Information and Librarianship (JoHIL).

=== Activities ===
Prof. Anyaoku was at the 2020 Nigerian Library Association Conference/AGM at Professor Kenneth Dike State Cental E-Library Awka, Anambra State and made a speech on library development and roles.

She participated at the unveiling of a new national literacy initiative titled the “Reading Sessions Project” in Abuja with the former Minister of Information and Culture, Alhaji Lai Mohammed. She was said to be one of the Keynote speakers at the 2023 World's Children's Day Celebration, held at the University of Abuja Centre for Gender Security Studies and Youth Advancement with the theme, "More Money for Education." In her speech she "identified the role of digital libraries in education, the issues facing the girl child and how to tackle it."

Prof. Anyaoku attended the World Library and Information Congress (WLIC) in 2019 at Athens, Greece where she presented a paper on Data Librarianship: Open Data Awareness, Perceptions and Services in Medical Libraries in Nigeria.

==== Membership of professional associations ====
Pro. Anyaoku is a member of the International Association of University Libraries (IATUL). She belongs to Nigerian Library Association and was once their Chairman.

== Publications ==
Librarians Conceptions of Information Literacy in Three Federal Universities in South East Nigeria: Implications for Effective Implementations of Information Literacy Programmes.

Determinants of Health Information Use for Self-Efficacy in Lifestyle Modification for Chronic Disease Patients (2015).

Data Librarianship: Open Data Awareness, Perceptions and Services in Medical Libraries in Nigeria.

Librarians Use of Information Literacy Strategic Tools for Teaching Students in Nigeria Universities to Combat Fake News and Misinformation.

Extent of Access to Health Information and Sources for Chronic Disease Patients in Tertiary Health Institutions in South East Nigeria: Implications for Libraries Role.

Medical libraries and achieving sustainable development goals in Nigeria.

The Use of Open Access by Medical Librarians in Nigeria: A Survey of Knowledge and Practices.
