= Information criticism =

Information criticism (also critique of information or information critique) is understood as a transformation of critical theory to contend that today there is no longer any transcendental, objective, or privileged position from which critique or social analysis can be undertaken. If society is intrinsically informational, and the analyst is inescapably part of the society, so too must the analyst and the analysis be informational, as tied up with and characterized by the nature of information as every other social entity or phenomenon. As Lash (2002) wrote, "The critique of information is in the information itself" (p. 220); "Information critique must be critique without transcendentals" (p. 9).

Andersen (2005/2008) equates information criticism with the criticism of the functionality and legitimacy of knowledge organization systems such as bibliographies, classification systems, thesauri, encyclopedias and search engines — all systems that in some way or another mediate the recorded part of society and culture. Such knowledge organization systems are also the professional tools of librarians.

== See also ==
- Source criticism
- Information activism

== Literature ==
- Andersen, Jack (2008). Information Criticism: Where is it? In: Questioning Library Neutrality. Essays from Progressive Librarian, pp. 97-108. Edited by Alison Lewis. Library Juice Press, Duluth, Minnesota. (Reprint of Information Criticism: Where is it? Progressive Librarian, no. 25, pp. 12-22, 2005). Link
- Cano, Jeimy J. (2002). Critical Reflections on Information Systems: A Systemic Approach. Hershey, PA: IGI Global.
- Howcroft, Debra & Trauth, Eileen Moore (Eds.). (2005). Handbook of Critical Information Systems Research: Theory And Application. ISBN 978-1-84376-478-6
- Lash, Scott M. (2002). Critique of Information. London: Sage.
- Lewis, Alison (Ed.). (2008). Questioning Library Neutrality: Essays from Progressive Librarian. Duluth, MN: Library Juice Press. ISBN 978-0-9778617-7-4 Link;.
- Lievrouw, Leah (2004). Book review of Lash (2002): Critique of Information. The Information Society, 20, 147–148. Link.
- Sheppard, E. (2001). Geographic Information Systems: Critical Approaches. IN: Smelser, N. J. & Baltes, P. B. (eds.) International Encyclopedia of the Social and Behavioral Sciences. Amsterdam: Elsevier.(pp. 6182-6185).
