= Critical military studies =

Critical Military Studies is a new academic sub-discipline which brings critical theory to the study of military institutions and practices. It intersects with many academic disciplines, such as international relations, political science, gender studies, human geography and anthropology. Academic conferences in 2013 and 2014 have included panels on Critical Military Studies. The sub-discipline also has a new academic journal published by Taylor and Francis. Scholarship on Critical Military Studies includes issues such as military recruitment and military landscapes. Critical Military Studies is particularly concerned with how understandings of gender and sexuality shape military practices and research on the military.
