= Counterhegemony =

Confrontation and/or opposition to existing status quo and its legitimacy in politics

Counter-hegemony is an attempt to critique or dismantle hegemonic power. In other words, it is a confrontation or opposition to existing status quo and its legitimacy in politics, but can also be observed in various other spheres of life, such as history, media, music, etc. Neo-Gramscian theorist Nicola Pratt (2004) has described counter-hegemony as "a creation of an alternative hegemony on the terrain of civil society in preparation for political change".

According to Theodore H. Cohn, "a counterhegemony is an alternative ethical view of society that poses a challenge to the dominant bourgeois-led view".

If a counterhegemony grows large enough it is able to subsume and replace the historic bloc it was born in. Neo-Gramscians use the Machiavellian terms war of position and war of movement to explain how this is possible. In a war of position, a counterhegemonic movement attempts, through persuasion or propaganda, to increase the number of people who share its view on the hegemonic order; in a war of movement, the counterhegemonic tendencies which have grown large enough to overthrow, violently or democratically, the current hegemony and establish themselves as a new historic bloc.

An example of counter-hegemony in politics is the "anti-globalization movement"; another one is counter-hegemonic nationalism, a form of nationalism that deliberately attempts to put forward an idea of nationality that challenges the dominant one on its own terrain. An example of counter-hegemony in media could be a documentary questioning the government’s involvement in a war.

== Origins of the concept ==
"Hegemony" was conceptualized by Karl Marx and Antonio Gramsci, a Marxist social philosopher who lived in Mussolini's Italy. Because Gramsci was a Marxist, he subscribed to the basic Marxist premise of the dialectic and therefore the contradiction. In his writings Gramsci claims that intellectuals create both hegemony and counter-hegemony. He argues that "there is no organization without intellectuals," for to be without them is to be without "the theoretical aspect of the theory-practice nexus essential to all effective organizations".

== Counter-hegemonic actions ==
Counter-hegemonic groups of people do not start off as radical or extremist groups; they encourage people to share their view against hegemony through the use of persuasion and/or propaganda whilst raising awareness. One view describes the possibility that once the counter-hegemonic group has gained enough support and consensus against the current powers, they would then attempt to overthrow them, whether through violence or democracy. Depending on whether full power is given to each individual, or if it is kept among a close few could be the deterministic factor between a decentralized government and a dictatorship.

== See also ==
- Critical terrorism studies
- Cultural hegemony
- Far-left politics
- Power (social and political)
