= Radical Reference =

Distributed collective of library workers working on social justice

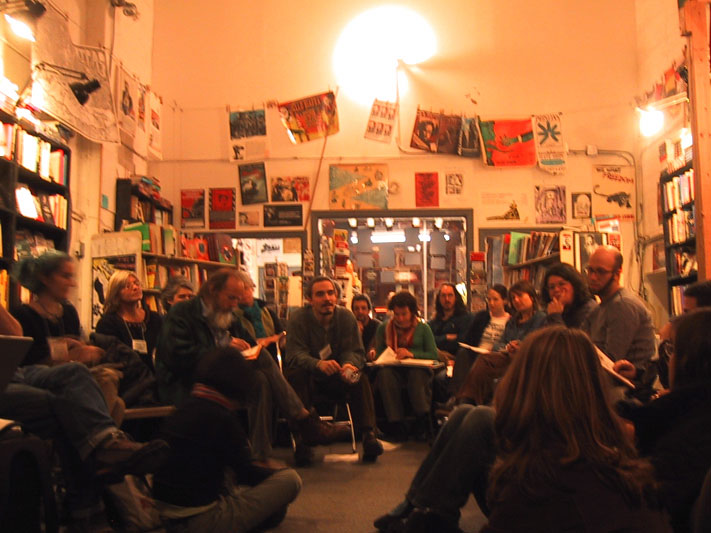
- RadRef meeting in 2005
- Formation: 2004
- Founded at: New York City
- Website: radicalreference.info

Radical Reference is a distributed collective of library workers, students and information activists who work on social justice issues. They provide professional research support, education and access to information to activist communities, progressive organizations, and independent journalists who they describe as their "patron base".

The organization was formed in 2004 by Jenna Freedman, Chuck Munson, Ellen Knutson, Kris Kasianovitz, James R. Jacobs, and Shinjoung Yeo in order to coordinate a team of volunteer library workers in assisting demonstrators and activists with their activities surrounding the Republican National Convention in New York City. The group used a combination of pre-made "ready reference kits" which contained "maps, legal information, lists of events". The reference volunteers who were working at the event wearing "Info Here" shirts were also connected to home support volunteers who could answer more complex questions using their home computers.

Librarians Melissa Morrone & Lia Friedman say the group is "a traditional and technological mashup of activism, outreach, and teaching for a new socially conscious user." Michael Hughes comments that the group "eschew[s] neutral practice, recognizing that information access is always political." Radical Reference has spawned over fifteen local Radical Reference Collectives which have worked on activist issues in their communities. As one example, the North Texas Radical Reference Collective created an Alternative Guide to Dallas in advance of the American Library Association's 2012 conference which highlighted restaurants with vegan offerings and bike and public transportation options.

Other members of the group have worked on other information projects including:

- Signing up as a partner organization of the NYC Grassroots Media Conference organizing committee in 2007
- Creating a lending library of books and resources at Bitch Magazine in Portland Oregon in 2009
- Hosting an unconference as an unofficial preconference to the Association of College and Research Libraries meeting in Seattle in 2009
- Organizing a Critical Library Symposium, "Practical Choices for Powerful Impacts: Realizing the Activist Potential of Librarians," in Boston in 2012
- Setting up Radical Reference "stations" at existing activist events such as the Really Really Free Market in Manhattan and the Mid Atlantic Radical Bookfair
- Publishing a zine We Are All Suspects : a Guide for People Navigating the Expanded Powers of Surveillance in the 21st century in 2014

The group is decentralized and international, communicating mostly via email and a drupal-based website which also serves as a knowledge base of archived reference questions. They answered reference questions through their website from 2006 through 2013.
