= Information activism =

Subclass of media activism

Information activism at libraries and among librarians began in the 1960s, when many libraries advocated for the information rights of their clients. Their activism projects thereafter extended beyond library walls to advocate for issues such as tenancy and labour rights. With the advent of new information technologies and the information explosion of the late 20th century, information activism expanded in scope to include people who utilize information in the service of advocacy.

An information activist is someone who works to make information available to the general population. According to Anthony Molaro, "An information activist is a vigorous advocate of knowledge gained through study, communication, research or instruction". Tactical Technology Collective has proposed a definition of information activism as "the strategic and deliberate use of information within a campaign" which specifically refers to the use of publicly available information in activist projects. Information activists take on many projects to work to remove barriers and provide access to knowledge for all people. Information activism can take on many different forms and be used in many different fields including in librarianship, in archiving, and in activist projects.

== In librarianship ==
Carla Hayden was quoted describing librarians of today as people "who are activists, engaged in the social work aspect of librarianship ... Now we are fighters for freedom, and we cause trouble! We are not sitting quietly anymore."

=== Library Juice Press ===
Library Juice Press is a publisher that specializes in theoretical and practical issues in librarianship from a critical perspective, for an audience of professional librarians and students of library science. They began as the webzine and blog Library Juice and still hold no affiliations to an academic institution. Some topics they investigate are: library philosophy, information policy, library activism, and in general anything that can be placed under the rubric of "critical studies in librarianship."
Library Juice Press is an imprint of Litwin Books, LLC.

== In archiving ==
Interference Archive is a collectively-run archive in Brooklyn, New York that opened in December 2011. The Archive "explores the relationship between cultural production and social movements." They are a volunteer driven archive whose mission is to bring attention to and honour the history of activist movements, which are often ignored by mainstream institutions. Their collection includes books, prints, music, moving images, and ephemera that were produced by various social movements. Since 2011, Interference Archive has expanded their collection of activist materials, hosted sixteen public exhibitions, written four publications, given over one hundred talks and workshops, and held various film screenings.

== In activist projects ==
The Tactical Technology Collective is an nongovernmental organization that works to "advance the use of information and digital technologies by advocates and activists worldwide" The organization runs a number of information activism projects including the 10 Tactics for Turning Information into Action, 10 Tactics Revisited, and the Info Activism Camp. Their two 10 Tactics campaigns are both a film and a project which aims to link the ways in which information and information technologies have been used in social movements. In particular, information is used to "monitor the state, corporations, and powerful social institutions," hold them accountable, and promote local and global activism. The Info Activism Camp exists as space to bring together activists from around the world to develop information activism techniques.

== See also ==
- Data activism
- Information criticism
- Information wants to be free
- Information war
- Library and information science
- Zine
- Free culture movement
- Freedom of information
- Librarians Without Borders
- Open data
- Radical Reference
