= Michael Stohl =

Michael Stohl (born 1947) is Professor and a former Chair of the Department of Communication at the University of California, Santa Barbara. He researches organizational and political communication with special focus on terrorism, human rights and global relations. He has been a guest commentator on National Public Radio, NBC, and CBS for stories on terrorism and human rights. He has been critical of the George W. Bush administration's understanding of terrorism networks during the war on terrorism.

== Academic career ==
Stohl was born in Brooklyn, New York. He attended the State University of New York at Buffalo (A.B., 1969); and Northwestern University (M.A., 1970, Ph.D., 1974).

He taught political science at Kendall College in Evanston, Illinois in the summer 1971. He was a visiting research associate and later acting research administrator as the Richardson Institute for Peace and Conflict Research in London, England from 1971 to 1972. He began teaching at Purdue University in West Lafayette, Indiana in 1972, becoming a full professor in 1985. He was a visiting researcher on terrorism at the University of Leiden, The Netherlands in 1989 and 1985.

He was a member of the Search for Common Ground sponsored United States-Soviet Union Task Force on International Terrorism which met in Moscow and Santa Monica, California in January and September 1989.

== Awards ==
Stohl received a Fulbright Fellowship for International Education Administrators in Japan and Korea in 1989. He was given a Senior Fulbright Fellowship to lecture at the University of Canterbury in Christchurch, New Zealand in 1983. In 2009 he was appointed to be the first Erskine Fellow in the department of political science at the University of Canterbury. During his tenure at Purdue he completed five Indianapolis Half-Marathons.

== Bibliography ==
- War and Domestic Political Violence: The American Capacity for Repression and Reaction, Sage Publications, 1976.
- (Editor and contributor) The Politics of Terrorism, Dekker, 1979, 3rd revised edition, 1988.
- (Editor with Harry R. Targ, and contributor) The Global Political Economy in the 1980s, Schenkman, 1982.
- (Editor with George Lopez, and contributor) The State as Terrorist: The Dynamics of Governmental Violence and Repression, Greenwood Press, 1984.
- (Editor with Lopez, and contributor) Government Violence and Repression: An Agenda for Research, Greenwood Press, 1986.
- (Editor with Lopez, and contributor) Redemocratization and Liberalization in Latin America, Greenwood Press, 1987.
- (Editor with Lopez) Development, Dependence and State Repression, Greenwood Press, 1987.
- (Editor with Lopez) The Foreign Policy of Terror, Greenwood Press, 1987.
- Editor with Robert Slater, and contributor) Current Perspectives on International Terrorism, St. Martin's, 1987.
- (Collaborator with Alex P. Schmid and Albert J. Jongman) Political Terrorism: A New Guide to Actors, Authors, Concepts, Data Bases, Theories, and Literature, North-Holland Pub. Co., 1988.
- (Co-editor with Chadwick Alger) A Just Peace Through Transformation: Cultural, Economic, and Political Foundations for Change: Proceedings of the International Peace Research Association, Eleventh General Conference, Westview Press, 1988.
- (Co-editor with George A. Lopez) Terrible Beyond Endurance?: The Foreign Policy of State Terrorism, Greenwood Press, 1988.
- (Co-editor with George A. Lopez) International Relations: Contemporary Theory and Practice, CQ Press, 1989.
