= Social acceleration =

Sociological concept

Social acceleration (German: soziale Beschleunigung) is a sociological concept of time in late modernity developed by German sociologist Hartmut Rosa. It was featured in his book Beschleunigung. Die Veränderung der Zeitstrukturen in der Moderne (lit. 'Acceleration. The change in time structures in modernity').

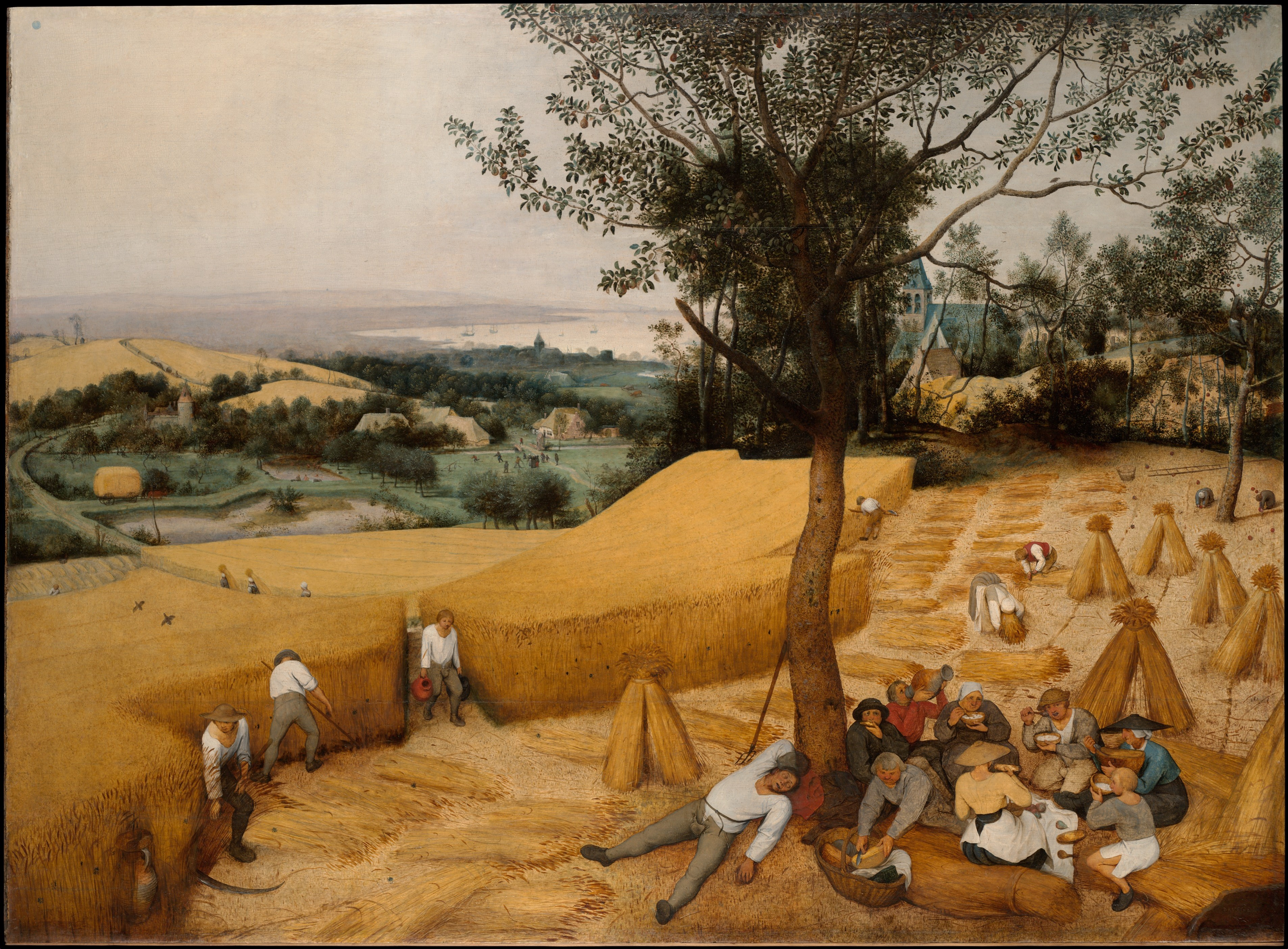
Rosa views medieval labourers as belonging to a different temporal framework to those born after the Industrial Revolution, since time was structured around natural cycles.

Social acceleration describes a frenetic sense of time caused by the increase in technological advancement since the Industrial Revolution. Rosa argues that advances in communication, transportation, and production have made things happen faster, creating new expectations of efficiency and speed in all areas of life in ways that alienate people from the world.

Despite the increase in pace, life does not always seem faster. Rosa coined the term frenetic standstill in reference to this dynamic.

== Abstract and linear time ==
In Rosa's view, a medieval peasant's life was organized around nature's linear time, such as seasons and day-night cycles. Work and life tasks were dictated by nature, meaning there was little expectation for rapid change or constant activity.

In contrast, Rosa argues modern life is governed by abstract time. Abstract time structures are defined according to the task in question. Abstract time is not bound by natural linear time, but by new temporal structures, such as schedules, deadlines, or even very short windows of time such as stock transactions, which can be executed in microseconds. Abstract time treats time as a resource to be continually redefined, controlled and divided. Therefore, instead of stability, late modern subjects experience frenetic change, intensification, and pressure to keep up.

The term does not merely refer to the widely held view that modernity is characterised by a rapid pace of life. Rather, it refers to "an increase in quantity per unit of time". Therefore, it describes a situation where the potential number of distinct experience episodes in a given timeframe has rapidly increased. Rosa suggests this creates a "contraction of the present," described as "a decrease of the length of time for which there prevail secure expectations regarding the stability of the circumstances of action".

== Dynamic stabilization ==
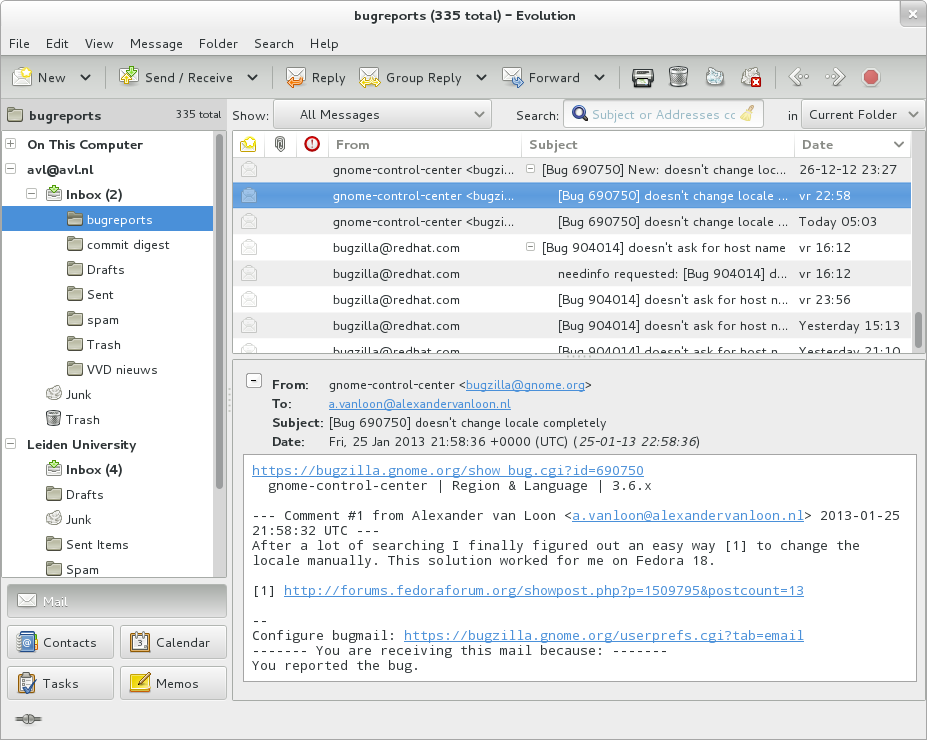
Email transformed communication by significantly boosting the volume of messages that could be sent. While it eliminated the time constraints of traditional mail, it also created new challenges, including the expectation for quick replies and the risk of information overload.

As a phenomenologist, Rosa claims that social acceleration is present on both an international and individual level. For instance, he states that for a government's credit rating to remain the same they must accelerate the rate of production. This logic of needing to speed up just to stay where you are is what Rosa terms dynamic stabilization. On the individual level, social acceleration has led to burnout, since the number of possible tasks and commitments far exceeds the amount of time available. This creates a constant pressure to control, parameterise, and optimise every moment, leading individuals to feel perpetually overwhelmed and incapable of keeping pace, an experience he calls frenetic standstill.

== Impact of technology ==
Email greatly expanded the number of messages that could be transmitted, removing the time limitations of traditional mail. However, this transition brought about new challenges, including the demand for quick replies and the potential for information overload. Additionally, social acceleration is evident on streaming services and social media trends, intensifying the enormous pressure to stay current with ever-evolving content and interactions.

Rosa views dynamics like these as demonstrating how social acceleration normalises a mode of aggression to the world, one that insists that resources be available, accessible and attainable. He claims that this mode of aggression towards the world is present in every aspect of life, from trade, to political discourse, and social interaction.

== Consequences of acceleration ==
Rosa suggests that this relentless acceleration not only leads to burnout but also disrupts our ability to form meaningful relationships with the world, causing alienation. This difference between linear time and abstract time is key to social acceleration.

On an individual level the result is a profound shift in everyday life, with modern people feeling a constant race against time, unlike the slower pace that medieval subjects experienced, in which hard work took up most of their lives, but for whom the number of possible tasks were clearly defined. On a policy level, the rate of technological and social change is said to create an inertia effect where policymakers cannot keep up with challenging sociopolitical changes as they happen. Therefore, regulation of technologies like AI are perpetually behind the actual rate of technological change.

Rosa uses the term resonance to describe moments of brief respite from social acceleration.

== See also ==
- Acceleration (human development)
- Overwork
- Slow movement
- Time–space compression – Idea in space–time
