= Librarians Without Borders =

Nonprofit library organization

- Founded: 2005
- Founder: Melanie Sellar and Jorge Chimbinda
- Type: Social action non-profit
- Purpose: Literacy
- Headquarters: London, Ontario, Canada
- Origins: University of Western Ontario, Student Organization
- Region served: International
- Method: Outreach, library building, education
- Members: 1,326
- Key people: Stephen Abram, Rabert Kalnins, Anthony Molaro, Heather Moulaison
- Revenue: $11,458
- Expenses: $8,793
- Website: lwb-online.org

Librarians Without Borders is an international nonprofit organization with headquarters located in London, Ontario, Canada. This is not to be confused with Libraries Without Borders, which has its headquarters in France, Belgium, Canada and Switzerland, or Bibliothécaires Sans Frontières, a now defunct French nonprofit. The organization is overseen by student committees at five Canadian Universities and a volunteer Executive Team and Board of Directors. Librarians Without Borders seeks to provide access to information in communities worldwide by creating partnerships with local people and local librarians. Librarians Without Borders engage in a number of outreach programs created to inspire a love of learning, community engagement and citizen scientists. Members are located in over 75 countries with the majority in Canada and the United States.

== History ==
Librarians Without Borders (LWB) was founded by Melanie Sellar and Jorge Chimbinda at the University of Western Ontario's library school in London, Ontario, in February 2005. The organization was founded with the mission to "strive to improve access to information resources regardless of language, geography, or religion through the formation of partnerships with community organizations in developing regions." The first project undertaken by LWB was in Huambo, Angola, with the goal of building a sustainable library to house desperately needed nursing and medical information resources, among other resources to be added later.

== Projects ==
Since its inception Librarians Without Borders has partnered with local community organizations, international non-governmental organizations, educational institutions, and other non-profit organizations to improve access to information in developing regions. Major projects have been undertaken in Angola, Ghana, Costa Rica, and Guatemala.

=== Angola ===
Librarians Without Borders' inaugural project focused on providing a medical and nursing collection for the Biblioteca Tutangi, a Portuguese-language library in Huambo, Angola. The library was acquired and renovated in early 2004 with the support of a local Catholic Mission. In addition to providing medical resources, LWB planned to partner with Angola library staff to provide collection development and maintenance support, information literacy instruction, and professional development. Due to complications related to legal issues surrounding the name of the organization brought forth by Doctors Without Borders and communication difficulties as a result of staff relocation, LWB decided to direct funds destined for the development of the collection to another African library by adopting an institution through the Canadian Organization for Development through Education (CODE).

=== Ghana ===
In 2011, Librarians Without Borders partnered with Librii—whose vision is to work with local communities to build low-cost networked libraries in the developing world—to develop a digitally powered library in Accra, Ghana. While Librii would provided the "up-front costs for the facilities and provided content updates for the digital portal," LWB would bring to the partnership the professional expertise and skills needed to establish and manage the library. Since launching its Ghana project LWB has offered library science students and professional librarians the opportunity to work with Librii and its parent organization, Libraries Across Africa, to conduct research projects in library and information science.

=== Costa Rica ===
In 2010, LWB student committee members from the University of Western Ontario traveled to El Humo de Pejibaye in Costa Rica to build a school library and furnish it with books and other materials obtained through fundraising. The project was made possible through a partnership with La Asociación de Voluntariado, Investigación y Desarrollo Ambiental. In addition to constructing the library, students also "designed a basic cataloging method, processed the ISO-plus Spanish and English books purchased, created a card catalog, and prepared a library handbook for the school administrators."

=== Guatemala ===
In April 2010, students at the LWB Chapter at McGill University traveled to Quetzaltenango, Guatemala, to establish a school library at the Asturias Academy, a combined preK-12 grade school of 250 students. The LWB Chapter students brought donations of books and school supplies, but their primary goal was to "address key aspects of library building and practices, including cataloguing, collection development, library space and layout, shelving recommendations, and programming ideas" Since 2010, LWB runs annual library service trips to Guatemala during April and May.

== Student Chapters and Committees ==
Founded and supported by graduate students, Librarians Without Borders is governed with the support of Executive Committees from five Canadian Universities:

- Dalhousie University
- McGill University
- University of Ottawa
- University of Toronto
- University of Western Ontario

== See also ==
- Information activism

== Sources ==
- Baird, Catherine; Rebecca Jansen; Daniella Liebregts (2007). "Librarians Without Borders". Journal of Hospital Librarianship. 7 (2). doi:10.1300/J186v07n02_06.
- Doi, Carolyn; Erin Walker (2010). "Librarians without borders: Central American connections". Feliciter. 56 (5).
- Heesen, Erika; Melanie Sellar (2013). "International Collaborations: Librarians Without Borders and Librii in Ghana". Feliciter. 59 (6).
