= Micha Brumlik =

Swiss-German academic (1947–2025)

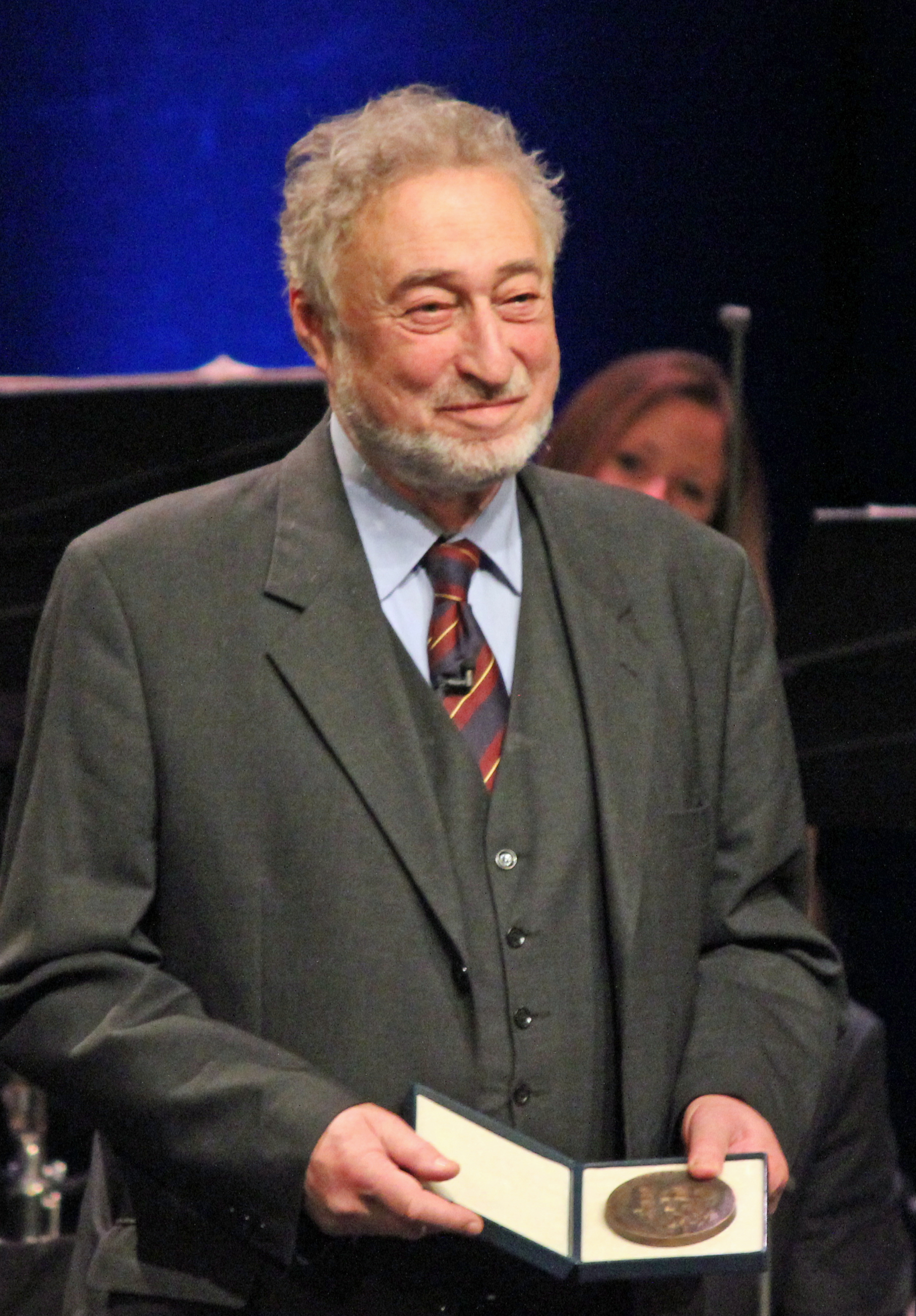
Brumlik in 2016

Micha Brumlik (4 November 1947 – 10 November 2025) was a Swiss-German academic who was a professor of education at the Goethe University of Frankfurt am Main, Germany. From October 2000 to 2005, he was director of the Fritz Bauer Institute for the Study and Documentation of the History of the Holocaust.

== Life and career ==
Brumlik was born in Davos, Switzerland, in 1947, the son of German-Jewish refugees. In 1968 and 1969, Brumlik was a student in Jerusalem where he became a member of the communist organization Matzpen. An early critic of Israel's treatment of Palestinians, Brumlik joined a kibbutz and identified as an anti-Zionist.

Brumlik died on 10 November 2025, at the age of 78.

== Books (selection) ==
- Die Gnostiker. Der Traum von der Selbsterlösung der Menschen (1992) (German)
- Schrift, Wort, Ikone. Wege aus dem Bilderverbot (1994) (German)
- Kein Weg als Deutscher und Jude. Eine bundesrepublikanische Erfahrung (1996) (German)
- Vernunft und Offenbarung. Religionsphilosophische Versuche (2000) (German)
- Deutscher Geist und Judenhaß. Das Verhältnis des philosophischen Idealismus zum Judentum (2000) (German)
- Bildung und Glück. Versuch einer Theorie der Tugenden (2002) (German)
- Aus Katastrophen lernen. Grundlagen zeitgeschichtlicher Bildung in menschenrechtlicher Absicht (2004) (German)
- Wer Sturm sät. Die Vertreibung der Deutschen (2005) (German)
- Sigmund Freud. Der Denker des 20. Jahrhunderts (2006)
